= Ishan Chandra Manikya =

H.R.H. Maharaja Ishan Chandra Manikya Debbarma
- King of Tripura
- Reign: 1849-1862
- Predecessor: Krishna Kishore Manikya
- Successor: Bir Chandra Manikya
- Dynasty: Manikya Dynasty
- Religion: Hinduism

Kingdom of Tripura
- Part of History of Tripura
Kings of Tripura
| Maha Manikya | c. 1400–1431 |
| Dharma Manikya I | 1431–1462 |
| Ratna Manikya I | 1462–1487 |
| Pratap Manikya | 1487 |
| Vijaya Manikya I | 1488 |
| Mukut Manikya | 1489 |
| Dhanya Manikya | 1490–1515 |
| Dhwaja Manikya | 1515–1520 |
| Deva Manikya | 1520–1530 |
| Indra Manikya I | 1530–1532 |
| Vijaya Manikya II | 1532–1563 |
| Ananta Manikya | 1563–1567 |
| Udai Manikya I | 1567–1573 |
| Joy Manikya I | 1573–1577 |
| Amar Manikya | 1577–1585 |
| Rajdhar Manikya I | 1586–1600 |
| Ishwar Manikya | 1600 |
| Yashodhar Manikya | 1600–1623 |
| Interregnum | 1623–1626 |
| Kalyan Manikya | 1626–1660 |
| Govinda Manikya | 1660–1661 |
| Chhatra Manikya | 1661–1667 |
| Govinda Manikya | 1661–1673 |
| Rama Manikya | 1673–1685 |
| Ratna Manikya II | 1685–1693 |
| Narendra Manikya | 1693–1695 |
| Ratna Manikya II | 1695–1712 |
| Mahendra Manikya | 1712–1714 |
| Dharma Manikya II | 1714–1725 |
| Jagat Manikya | 1725–1729 |
| Dharma Manikya II | 1729 |
| Mukunda Manikya | 1729–1739 |
| Joy Manikya II | 1739–1744 |
| Indra Manikya II | 1744–1746 |
| Udai Manikya II | 1744 |
| Joy Manikya II | 1746 |
| Vijaya Manikya III | 1746–1748 |
| Lakshman Manikya | 1740s/1750s |
| Interregnum | 1750s–1760 |
| Krishna Manikya | 1760–1783 |
| Rajdhar Manikya II | 1785–1806 |
| Rama Ganga Manikya | 1806–1809 |
| Durga Manikya | 1809–1813 |
| Rama Ganga Manikya | 1813–1826 |
| Kashi Chandra Manikya | 1826–1829 |
| Krishna Kishore Manikya | 1829–1849 |
| Ishan Chandra Manikya | 1849–1862 |
| Bir Chandra Manikya | 1862–1896 |
| Radha Kishore Manikya | 1896–1909 |
| Birendra Kishore Manikya | 1909–1923 |
| Bir Bikram Kishore Manikya | 1923–1947 |
| Kirit Bikram Kishore Manikya | 1947–1949; 1949–1978 (titular) |
| Kirit Pradyot Manikya | 1978–present (titular) |

Tripura monarchy data
- Manikya dynasty (Royal family)
- Agartala (Capital of the kingdom)
- Ujjayanta Palace (Royal residence)
- Pushbanta Palace (Royal residence)
- Neermahal (Royal residence)
- Rajmala (Royal chronicle)
- Tripura Buranji (Chronicle)
- Chaturdasa Devata (Family deities)

Maharaja Ishan Chandra Manikya of the Manikya Dynasty was the king of Tripura from 1849 to 1862

== Biography ==
He was the son of Krishna Kishore Manikya. His son Nabadwipchandra Dev Burman was a noted Indian sitarist and Dhrupad singer and the father of composer S. D. Burman and grandfather of another composer R. D. Burman. Thus, he is the great-grandfather of the famous Bollywood composer R. D. Burman.

He was married to three Manipuri queens who were not of royal origin. Muktabali of Moirangthem, Chanu Jatiswari of Keisham and Chandreswari of Khumanthem. Upon his death in 1862, his brother Bir Chandra Manikya assumed the throne instead of his own sons.

== See also ==
- Manikya dynasty
- Tripura (princely state)
