= Tripura Buranji =

Kingdom of Tripura
- Part of History of Tripura
Kings of Tripura
Maha Manikya	c. 1400–1431
Dharma Manikya I	1431–1462
Ratna Manikya I	1462–1487
Pratap Manikya	1487
Vijaya Manikya I	1488
Mukut Manikya	1489
Dhanya Manikya	1490–1515
Dhwaja Manikya	1515–1520
Deva Manikya	1520–1530
Indra Manikya I	1530–1532
Vijaya Manikya II	1532–1563
Ananta Manikya	1563–1567
Udai Manikya I	1567–1573
Joy Manikya I	1573–1577
Amar Manikya	1577–1585
Rajdhar Manikya I	1586–1600
Ishwar Manikya	1600
Yashodhar Manikya	1600–1623
Interregnum	1623–1626
Kalyan Manikya	1626–1660
Govinda Manikya	1660–1661
Chhatra Manikya	1661–1667
Govinda Manikya	1661–1673
Rama Manikya	1673–1685
Ratna Manikya II	1685–1693
Narendra Manikya	1693–1695
Ratna Manikya II	1695–1712
Mahendra Manikya	1712–1714
Dharma Manikya II	1714–1725
Jagat Manikya	1725–1729
Dharma Manikya II	1729
Mukunda Manikya	1729–1739
Joy Manikya II	1739–1744
Indra Manikya II	1744–1746
Udai Manikya II	1744
Joy Manikya II	1746
Vijaya Manikya III	1746–1748
Lakshman Manikya	1740s/1750s
Interregnum	1750s–1760
Krishna Manikya	1760–1783
Rajdhar Manikya II	1785–1806
Rama Ganga Manikya	1806–1809
Durga Manikya	1809–1813
Rama Ganga Manikya	1813–1826
Kashi Chandra Manikya	1826–1829
Krishna Kishore Manikya	1829–1849
Ishan Chandra Manikya	1849–1862
Bir Chandra Manikya	1862–1896
Birendra Kishore Manikya	1909–1923
Bir Bikram Kishore Manikya	1923–1947
Kirit Bikram Kishore Manikya	1947–1949; 1949–1978 (titular)
Kirit Pradyot Manikya	1978–present (titular)

Tripura monarchy data
- Manikya dynasty (Royal family)
- Agartala (Capital of the kingdom)
- Ujjayanta Palace (Royal residence)
- Pushbanta Palace (Royal residence)
- Neermahal (Royal residence)
- Rajmala (Royal chronicle)
- Tripura Buranji (Chronicle)
- Chaturdasa Devata (Family deities)

The Tripura Buranji is an account of the diplomatic contacts between the Ahom kingdom and the Tripura Kingdom between 1709 and 1715. This buranji was written in 1724 by the envoys of the Ahom kingdom, Ratna Kandali Sarma Kataki and Arjun Das Bairagi Kataki. It describes three diplomatic missions that was sent to the Twipra kingdom, two return missions accompanied by Tripuri envoys, incidental descriptions of palaces, ceremonies and customs; and it also provides an eye witness account of the Twipra king Ratna Manikya II (1684–1712) deposed by his step-brother Ghanashyam Barthakur, later Mahendra Manikya (1712–1714).

This manuscript falls under the class of documents called Buranjis, a tradition of chronicle writing of the Ahom kingdom, of which there are two types—official and family. The Tripura Buranji, along with Padshah Buranji, Kachari Buranji and Jaintia Buranji are official reports of neighboring kingdoms that the Ahom court sanctioned and maintained for record. Surya Kumar Bhuyan, who had edited this as well as many other Buranjis, considered it to enjoy an exalted position among similar class of writings.

Writers such as Chaudhuri and Sarkar consider the little-known document to be a significant source of extant events in Tripura. Besides, as N K Bhattacharya avers, it is a remarkable example of pre-colonial travel writing among such other writings as Kalidasa's Meghadootam etc. that describes "the landscape, habits, dress, manners and beliefs of the people, deities and temples and the intrigues for the throne within the court of Tripura."

== Manuscript ==
The manuscript is written in Assamese and bears the title Tripura Desar Kathar Lekha: Sri-Sri-Rudra Singha Maharaja-dewe Tripura Desar Raja Ratna Manikya sahit priti-purbak kataki gatagata kara katha, comprising about 146 folios (4"x17") of sanchipat made from the bark of the Aloe tree. Each folio had five lines of text on both sides and the 108th folio was missing. A table of contents existed at the end. The manuscript was purchased by the British Museum from J. Rodd on 8 January 1842. According to Bhuyan who has examined the manuscript, "the writings are legible, the words are separated and the divisions clearly marked"; and the handwriting displays cautious penmanship.

== Background ==
The diplomatic missions that constitute the core of the accounts in this document were triggered by the Ahom king Rudra Singha's desire to create a confederacy with the Twipra (and Morang, Bana-Vishnupur, Nadiya, Cooch Behar, Burdwan, and Barahanagar) kingdom to remove the Mughals from Bengal. There were three missions between the years 1709 and 1715.

== Contents ==
It describes "the landscape, habits, dress, manners and beliefs of the people, deities and temples and the intrigues for the throne within the court of Tripura." The strict protocols governing the diplomatic missions of the Ahom and Twipra kingdoms are described. A spring festival, as celebrated by the Twipra king and his subjects is noted of.
