= Mukunda Manikya =

Maharaja of Tripura
- Reign: 1729–1739
- Predecessor: Dharma Manikya II
- Successor: Joy Manikya II
- Born: Chandramani Thakur
- Died: 1739
- Wives: Prabhavati; Rukshmini
- issue: Indra Manikya II; Krishna Manikya; Jayamani; Harimani; Bhadramani
- House: Manikya dynasty
- Father: Rama Manikya
- Religion: Hinduism

Kingdom of Tripura
- Part of History of Tripura
Kings of Tripura
Maha Manikya	c. 1400–1431
Dharma Manikya I	1431–1462
Ratna Manikya I	1462–1487
Pratap Manikya	1487
Vijaya Manikya I	1488
Mukut Manikya	1489
Dhanya Manikya	1490–1515
Dhwaja Manikya	1515–1520
Deva Manikya	1520–1530
Indra Manikya I	1530–1532
Vijaya Manikya II	1532–1563
Ananta Manikya	1563–1567
Udai Manikya I	1567–1573
Joy Manikya I	1573–1577
Amar Manikya	1577–1585
Rajdhar Manikya I	1586–1600
Ishwar Manikya	1600
Yashodhar Manikya	1600–1623
Interregnum	1623–1626
Kalyan Manikya	1626–1660
Govinda Manikya	1660–1661
Chhatra Manikya	1661–1667
Govinda Manikya	1661–1673
Rama Manikya	1673–1685
Ratna Manikya II	1685–1693
Narendra Manikya	1693–1695
Ratna Manikya II	1695–1712
Mahendra Manikya	1712–1714
Dharma Manikya II	1714–1725
Jagat Manikya	1725–1729
Dharma Manikya II	1729
Mukunda Manikya	1729–1739
Joy Manikya II	1739–1744
Indra Manikya II	1744–1746
Udai Manikya II	1744
Joy Manikya II	1746
Vijaya Manikya III	1746–1748
Lakshman Manikya	1740s/1750s
Interregnum	1750s–1760
Krishna Manikya	1760–1783
Rajdhar Manikya II	1785–1806
Rama Ganga Manikya	1806–1809
Durga Manikya	1809–1813
Rama Ganga Manikya	1813–1826
Kashi Chandra Manikya	1826–1829
Krishna Kishore Manikya	1829–1849
Ishan Chandra Manikya	1849–1862
Bir Chandra Manikya	1862–1896
Radha Kishore Manikya	1896–1909
Birendra Kishore Manikya	1909–1923
Bir Bikram Kishore Manikya	1923–1947
Kirit Bikram Kishore Manikya	1947–1949; 1949–1978 (titular)
Kirit Pradyot Manikya	1978–present (titular)

Tripura monarchy data
- Manikya dynasty (Royal family)
- Agartala (Capital of the kingdom)
- Ujjayanta Palace (Royal residence)
- Pushbanta Palace (Royal residence)
- Neermahal (Royal residence)
- Rajmala (Royal chronicle)
- Tripura Buranji (Chronicle)
- Chaturdasa Devata (Family deities)

Mukunda Manikya (d. 1739) was the Maharaja of Tripura from 1729 to 1739.

== Life ==
Originally named Chandramani Thakur, he was the youngest of the four surviving sons of Maharaja Rama Manikya. Each of his elder brothers had successively ruled Tripura; under Ratna II's rule, Chandramani had been sent as a hostage to the Mughal viceregal court at Murshidabad, while during the reigns of Mahendra and Dharma II, he was appointed Barathakur and Yuvraj respectively. (Note: Barathakur was a recently-created post which meant "principal prince".)

When he succeeded Dharma in 1729, Chandramani assumed the regnal name Mukunda Manikya. He proved to be a pious monarch, donating lands to Brahmins and Kshatriyas. He attempted to maintain cordial relations with the Mughals, sending his son Panch Cowrie Thakur as a hostage and informing on a plot to kill the Mughal Faujdar at Udaipur by his cousin Rudramani.

However, in 1739, he was overthrown by the Mughals due to failing to provide Tripura's annual tribute of five elephants. Udaipur was raided and Mukunda, alongside his sons Bhadramani, Krishnamoni and nephew Gangadhar, were arrested. Unable to bear this humiliation, he poisoned himself, with his queen performing sati in his funeral pyre. He was succeeded by Rudramani (afterward known as Joy Manikya II), who was chosen over Mukunda's sons after he drove the Mughals out of Udaipur.
