= Udai Manikya I =

King of Tripura

Maharaja of Tripura
- Reign: 1567–1572
- Predecessor: Ananta Manikya
- Successor: Joy Manikya I
- Born: Gopi Prasad
- Died: 1572
- Consort: Hira Mahadevi
- Issue: Joy Manikya I; Ratnavati
- Religion: Hinduism

Kingdom of Tripura
- Part of History of Tripura
Kings of Tripura
Maha Manikya	c. 1400–1431
Dharma Manikya I	1431–1462
Ratna Manikya I	1462–1487
Pratap Manikya	1487
Vijaya Manikya I	1488
Mukut Manikya	1489
Dhanya Manikya	1490–1515
Dhwaja Manikya	1515–1520
Deva Manikya	1520–1530
Indra Manikya I	1530–1532
Vijaya Manikya II	1532–1563
Ananta Manikya	1563–1567
Udai Manikya I	1567–1573
Joy Manikya I	1573–1577
Amar Manikya	1577–1585
Rajdhar Manikya I	1586–1600
Ishwar Manikya	1600
Yashodhar Manikya	1600–1623
Interregnum	1623–1626
Kalyan Manikya	1626–1660
Govinda Manikya	1660–1661
Chhatra Manikya	1661–1667
Govinda Manikya	1661–1673
Rama Manikya	1673–1685
Ratna Manikya II	1685–1693
Narendra Manikya	1693–1695
Ratna Manikya II	1695–1712
Mahendra Manikya	1712–1714
Dharma Manikya II	1714–1725
Jagat Manikya	1725–1729
Dharma Manikya II	1729
Mukunda Manikya	1729–1739
Joy Manikya II	1739–1744
Indra Manikya II	1744–1746
Udai Manikya II	1744
Joy Manikya II	1746
Vijaya Manikya III	1746–1748
Lakshman Manikya	1740s/1750s
Interregnum	1750s–1760
Krishna Manikya	1760–1783
Rajdhar Manikya II	1785–1806
Rama Ganga Manikya	1806–1809
Durga Manikya	1809–1813
Rama Ganga Manikya	1813–1826
Kashi Chandra Manikya	1826–1829
Krishna Kishore Manikya	1829–1849
Ishan Chandra Manikya	1849–1862
Bir Chandra Manikya	1862–1896
Radha Kishore Manikya	1896–1909
Birendra Kishore Manikya	1909–1923
Bir Bikram Kishore Manikya	1923–1947
Kirit Bikram Kishore Manikya	1947–1949; 1949–1978 (titular)
Kirit Pradyot Manikya	1978–present (titular)

Tripura monarchy data
- Manikya dynasty (Royal family)
- Agartala (Capital of the kingdom)
- Ujjayanta Palace (Royal residence)
- Pushbanta Palace (Royal residence)
- Neermahal (Royal residence)
- Rajmala (Royal chronicle)
- Tripura Buranji (Chronicle)
- Chaturdasa Devata (Family deities)

Udai Manikya I (died 1572), also known as Gopi Prasad, was the Maharaja of Tripura from 1567 to 1572. Though from a lowly background, he later rose to become one of the most powerful figures in the kingdom. Following the death of the previous monarch, his son-in-law, Udai took royal power himself, for a time supplanting the ruling dynasty with his own line.

== Life ==
Originally named Gopi Prasad, he was of humble origins. He began his career during the reign of Vijaya Manikya II, serving as a gomasta (rent-collector) in Dharmanagar, though was later driven out of this position after having climbed a tree belonging to a Brahmin. Thereafter, he was appointed as a cook in the royal kitchens, then a chowkidar, before ultimately rising to become Commander-in-Chief of the Tripura army. His influence further increased when Vijaya, wishing to ensure the ambitious officer's loyalty, married his own son to the latter's daughter, Ratnavati.

Upon the ascension of his son-in-law, Ananta Manikya, to the throne in 1563, Gopi Prasad expanded his already extensive power, keeping the new king completely under his control. This arrangement proved to be short-lived, when, in 1567, Ananta died under uncertain circumstances. According to differing versions of the Rajmala, this was either the result of a fever or through strangulation on Gopi Prasad's orders. Regardless, the latter subsequently claimed royal power and adopted the regnal name Udai Manikya, assuming the erstwhile ruling dynasty's cognomen.

Udai proved to be a talented administrator and renamed the kingdom's capital, changing it from Rangamati to Udaipur after himself. He extensively worked to beautify the city with the construction of buildings, temples and reservoirs, among which were the Chandra Gopinath Temple and the Chandrasagar. He was less successful in warfare however, having become involved in a 5-year-long conflict with Sulaiman Khan Karrani, the Sultan of Bengal, resulting in heavy loss of money, 40,000 troops and the area of Chittagong.

Tradition states that Udai had 240 wives, several of whom, he had executed through being trampled by elephants or devoured by dogs on charges of infidelity. (Note: A visiting prince of Bengal was said to have numbered among their paramours.) Udai himself was poisoned to death in 1572, after having ingested a pill of quicksilver supplied by a certain woman. He was succeeded by his son Joy Manikya I (r. 1573–1577).
