= Joy Manikya II =

18th century Maharaja of Tripura

Maharaja of Tripura
- 1st reign: c. 1739–1744
- Predecessor: Mukunda Manikya
- Successor: Indra Manikya II
- 2nd reign: 1746
- Predecessor: Indra Manikya II
- Successor: Vijaya Manikya III
- Born: Rudramani Thakur
- Died: 1746
- Wives: Jayavati; Yosavati
- Issue: Jayamangal
- House: Manikya dynasty
- Father: Haradhan Thakur
- Religion: Hinduism

Kingdom of Tripura
- Part of History of Tripura
Kings of Tripura
Maha Manikya	c. 1400–1431
Dharma Manikya I	1431–1462
Ratna Manikya I	1462–1487
Pratap Manikya	1487
Vijaya Manikya I	1488
Mukut Manikya	1489
Dhanya Manikya	1490–1515
Dhwaja Manikya	1515–1520
Deva Manikya	1520–1530
Indra Manikya I	1530–1532
Vijaya Manikya II	1532–1563
Ananta Manikya	1563–1567
Udai Manikya I	1567–1573
Joy Manikya I	1573–1577
Amar Manikya	1577–1585
Rajdhar Manikya I	1586–1600
Ishwar Manikya	1600
Yashodhar Manikya	1600–1623
Interregnum	1623–1626
Kalyan Manikya	1626–1660
Govinda Manikya	1660–1661
Chhatra Manikya	1661–1667
Govinda Manikya	1661–1673
Rama Manikya	1673–1685
Ratna Manikya II	1685–1693
Narendra Manikya	1693–1695
Ratna Manikya II	1695–1712
Mahendra Manikya	1712–1714
Dharma Manikya II	1714–1725
Jagat Manikya	1725–1729
Dharma Manikya II	1729
Mukunda Manikya	1729–1739
Joy Manikya II	1739–1744
Indra Manikya II	1744–1746
Udai Manikya II	1744
Joy Manikya II	1746
Vijaya Manikya III	1746–1748
Lakshman Manikya	1740s/1750s
Interregnum	1750s–1760
Krishna Manikya	1760–1783
Rajdhar Manikya II	1785–1806
Rama Ganga Manikya	1806–1809
Durga Manikya	1809–1813
Rama Ganga Manikya	1813–1826
Kashi Chandra Manikya	1826–1829
Krishna Kishore Manikya	1829–1849
Ishan Chandra Manikya	1849–1862
Bir Chandra Manikya	1862–1896
Radha Kishore Manikya	1896–1909
Birendra Kishore Manikya	1909–1923
Bir Bikram Kishore Manikya	1923–1947
Kirit Bikram Kishore Manikya	1947–1949; 1949–1978 (titular)
Kirit Pradyot Manikya	1978–present (titular)

Tripura monarchy data
- Manikya dynasty (Royal family)
- Agartala (Capital of the kingdom)
- Ujjayanta Palace (Royal residence)
- Pushbanta Palace (Royal residence)
- Neermahal (Royal residence)
- Rajmala (Royal chronicle)
- Tripura Buranji (Chronicle)
- Chaturdasa Devata (Family deities)

Joy Manikya II (died 1746) was the Maharaja of Tripura during the mid-18th-century. He originally gained the throne through popular approval for his military hostility to the Mughal Empire. However, Joy spent much of his reign warring against various relations to maintain his grip on it, in particular with his cousin Indra Manikya II.

== Background ==
Originally named Rudramani Thakur, he belonged to a cadet branch of the royal family; his father Haradhan Thakur had been a grandson of Jagannath Thakur, the younger brother of Maharaja Govinda Manikya.

As a young man, Rudramani had been a prominent general and had opposed the suzerainty of the Mughal Empire over Tripura. To this end, he aimed to form a national militia against the occupying force. From his base in the Matia Hills (where he had been sent to capture elephants), Rudramani organised a strong force with the aid of tribal chiefs. He wrote to the then-monarch, Mukunda Manikya, stating that the people of Tripura were opposed to the Mughals and that if the latter gave his approval, Rudramani could arrange to have the Faujdar at Udaipur, Haji Munsam, and his men killed. Mukunda disavowed the proposal, instead opting to inform Munsam of the conspiracy.

== Reign ==
In 1739, Mukunda Manikya committed suicide, having been arrested by the Mughals on the grounds of neglecting to pay his tribute of elephants. In response, Rudramani launched a surprise assault on Udaipur and occupied it, with the Mughals, having been caught off guard, coming to terms and surrendering the city. His actions were popular among the Tripuri people, who selected him to be the new monarch as opposed to Mukunda's sons. Rudramani subsequently ascended the throne with the regnal name Joy Manikya.

In 1744, Panch Cowrie Thakur, a son of Mukunda living in the Mughal viceregal capital Murshidabad, approached the Nawab of Bengal, Alivardi Khan, for aid in wresting Tripura from Joy. The Mughals, still sore from their previous defeat, provided military support to Panch Cowrie, who was able to take the throne and assumed the name Indra Manikya. Joy withdrew from the capital and ran a parallel government from the Matia Hills. With the support of influential Zamindars, he made repeated attempts to reclaim full power, though was always held back by Mughal forces. The country remained divided between the partisans of the rival monarchs for a time before Joy was able to gain the support of the Mughals and retake the throne.

It was during this time that another relative, a son of Dharma Manikya II, taking advantage of the internal divisions, made his own claim for power. He bribed the Naib Nazim of Dhaka and arrived in Comilla with a strong Muslim army, assuming the name Udai Manikya. Joy was able to resist this enemy, forcing Udai into submission and driving him out. However, he now fell into arrears with his tribute to the Mughals. A military expedition was dispatched against Joy, which defeated him in an ensuing battle. He was taken to the Court of Murshidabad and arrested alongside his dignitaries, with Indra Manikya once more taking his place as ruler of Tripura.

By 1746, Joy had received control of the kingdom for a third time after Indra had fallen into disfavour with the Nawab. However, his remaining time on the throne was very brief, with much of it being troubled by Indra's younger brother Krishnamani. Following Joy's death that same year, he was succeeded by his younger brother Vijaya Manikya III.
