= Chhatra Manikya =

Maharaja of Tripura
- Reign: 1661–1667
- Predecessor: Govinda Manikya
- Successor: Govinda Manikya
- Born: Nakshatra Roy
- Died: 1667
- Issue: Utsab Roy
- House: Manikya dynasty
- Father: Kalyan Manikya
- Religion: Hinduism

Kingdom of Tripura
- Part of History of Tripura
Kings of Tripura
Maha Manikya	c. 1400–1431
Dharma Manikya I	1431–1462
Ratna Manikya I	1462–1487
Pratap Manikya	1487
Vijaya Manikya I	1488
Mukut Manikya	1489
Dhanya Manikya	1490–1515
Dhwaja Manikya	1515–1520
Deva Manikya	1520–1530
Indra Manikya I	1530–1532
Vijaya Manikya II	1532–1563
Ananta Manikya	1563–1567
Udai Manikya I	1567–1573
Joy Manikya I	1573–1577
Amar Manikya	1577–1585
Rajdhar Manikya I	1586–1600
Ishwar Manikya	1600
Yashodhar Manikya	1600–1623
Interregnum	1623–1626
Kalyan Manikya	1626–1660
Govinda Manikya	1660–1661
Chhatra Manikya	1661–1667
Govinda Manikya	1661–1673
Rama Manikya	1673–1685
Ratna Manikya II	1685–1693
Narendra Manikya	1693–1695
Ratna Manikya II	1695–1712
Mahendra Manikya	1712–1714
Dharma Manikya II	1714–1725
Jagat Manikya	1725–1729
Dharma Manikya II	1729
Mukunda Manikya	1729–1739
Joy Manikya II	1739–1744
Indra Manikya II	1744–1746
Udai Manikya II	1744
Joy Manikya II	1746
Vijaya Manikya III	1746–1748
Lakshman Manikya	1740s/1750s
Interregnum	1750s–1760
Krishna Manikya	1760–1783
Rajdhar Manikya II	1785–1806
Rama Ganga Manikya	1806–1809
Durga Manikya	1809–1813
Rama Ganga Manikya	1813–1826
Kashi Chandra Manikya	1826–1829
Krishna Kishore Manikya	1829–1849
Ishan Chandra Manikya	1849–1862
Bir Chandra Manikya	1862–1896
Radha Kishore Manikya	1896–1909
Birendra Kishore Manikya	1909–1923
Bir Bikram Kishore Manikya	1923–1947
Kirit Bikram Kishore Manikya	1947–1949; 1949–1978 (titular)
Kirit Pradyot Manikya	1978–present (titular)

Tripura monarchy data
- Manikya dynasty (Royal family)
- Agartala (Capital of the kingdom)
- Ujjayanta Palace (Royal residence)
- Pushbanta Palace (Royal residence)
- Neermahal (Royal residence)
- Rajmala (Royal chronicle)
- Tripura Buranji (Chronicle)
- Chaturdasa Devata (Family deities)

Chhatra Manikya (died 1667) was the Maharaja of Tripura from 1661 to 1667.

== Life ==
Born Nakshatra Rai, he was a younger son of Maharaja Kalyan Manikya. Following his father's defeat at the hands of the Mughal prince Shah Shuja in 1658, Nakshatra was sent as a hostage to the imperial court. While there, his charisma gained him the favour of the Mughal emperor.

After his father's death and the ascension of his brother Govinda Manikya, Nakshatra made a bid for the throne in 1661. With the backing of the emperor and the military support of the Mughal governor of Bengal, an attack was launched, with the capital Udaipur being captured on the first assault. Govinda was forced to leave the kingdom and Nakshatra ascended the throne under the name Chhatra Manikya.

After he had reigned six years, his brother returned and retook the throne, having used the aid of the neighbouring ruler of Arakan. It is uncertain whether Chhatra was killed by Govinda at this point, or if he had already died prior to the attack.
