= Lakshman Manikya =

Maharaja of Tripura

Maharaja of Tripura
- Predecessor: Vijaya Manikya III
- Successor: Shamsher Gazi
- Born: Banamali Thakur
- Issue: Durga Manikya
- House: Manikya dynasty
- Father: Gadadhar Thakur
- Religion: Hinduism

Kingdom of Tripura
- Part of History of Tripura
Kings of Tripura
Maha Manikya	c. 1400–1431
Dharma Manikya I	1431–1462
Ratna Manikya I	1462–1487
Pratap Manikya	1487
Vijaya Manikya I	1488
Mukut Manikya	1489
Dhanya Manikya	1490–1515
Dhwaja Manikya	1515–1520
Deva Manikya	1520–1530
Indra Manikya I	1530–1532
Vijaya Manikya II	1532–1563
Ananta Manikya	1563–1567
Udai Manikya I	1567–1573
Joy Manikya I	1573–1577
Amar Manikya	1577–1585
Rajdhar Manikya I	1586–1600
Ishwar Manikya	1600
Yashodhar Manikya	1600–1623
Interregnum	1623–1626
Kalyan Manikya	1626–1660
Govinda Manikya	1660–1661
Chhatra Manikya	1661–1667
Govinda Manikya	1661–1673
Rama Manikya	1673–1685
Ratna Manikya II	1685–1693
Narendra Manikya	1693–1695
Ratna Manikya II	1695–1712
Mahendra Manikya	1712–1714
Dharma Manikya II	1714–1725
Jagat Manikya	1725–1729
Dharma Manikya II	1729
Mukunda Manikya	1729–1739
Joy Manikya II	1739–1744
Indra Manikya II	1744–1746
Udai Manikya II	1744
Joy Manikya II	1746
Vijaya Manikya III	1746–1748
Lakshman Manikya	1740s/1750s
Interregnum	1750s–1760
Krishna Manikya	1760–1783
Rajdhar Manikya II	1785–1806
Rama Ganga Manikya	1806–1809
Durga Manikya	1809–1813
Rama Ganga Manikya	1813–1826
Kashi Chandra Manikya	1826–1829
Krishna Kishore Manikya	1829–1849
Ishan Chandra Manikya	1849–1862
Bir Chandra Manikya	1862–1896
Birendra Kishore Manikya	1909–1923
Bir Bikram Kishore Manikya	1923–1947
Kirit Bikram Kishore Manikya	1947–1949; 1949–1978 (titular)
Kirit Pradyot Manikya	1978–present (titular)

Tripura monarchy data
- Manikya dynasty (Royal family)
- Agartala (Capital of the kingdom)
- Ujjayanta Palace (Royal residence)
- Pushbanta Palace (Royal residence)
- Neermahal (Royal residence)
- Rajmala (Royal chronicle)
- Tripura Buranji (Chronicle)
- Chaturdasa Devata (Family deities)

Lakshman Manikya was the Maharaja of Tripura during the mid-18th-century, though he maintained little actual power, having acted only as a puppet-monarch under Shamsher Gazi.

== Life ==
Originally named Banamali Thakur, he was a grandson of Maharaja Dharma Manikya II by his younger son Gadadhar Thakur.

In 1748, control of Tripura was taken by Shamsher Gazi, a Bengali Muslim zamindar. Facing opposition from the kingdom's citizens, Gazi placed Banamali on the throne under the name Lakshman Manikya, though actual power remained with the former. This continued for three years, though Lakshman failed to gain the support of the population. Eventually, he was dislodged by Gazi who took the throne for himself, though his rule was similarly short, with the original dynasty reclaiming the power in 1760.

His son Durga Manikya also later became ruler of Tripura, reigning from 1809 to 1813.
