= Maha Manikya =

Maharaja of Tripura
- Reign: c. 1400–1431
- Successor: Dharma Manikya I
- Died: 1431
- Consort: Tripura Sundari
- Issue: Dharma Manikya I Gagan Fa three other sons
- House: Manikya dynasty

Kingdom of Tripura
- Part of History of Tripura
Kings of Tripura
Maha Manikya	c. 1400–1431
Dharma Manikya I	1431–1462
Ratna Manikya I	1462–1487
Pratap Manikya	1487
Vijaya Manikya I	1488
Mukut Manikya	1489
Dhanya Manikya	1490–1515
Dhwaja Manikya	1515–1520
Deva Manikya	1520–1530
Indra Manikya I	1530–1532
Vijaya Manikya II	1532–1563
Ananta Manikya	1563–1567
Udai Manikya I	1567–1573
Joy Manikya I	1573–1577
Amar Manikya	1577–1585
Rajdhar Manikya I	1586–1600
Ishwar Manikya	1600
Yashodhar Manikya	1600–1623
Interregnum	1623–1626
Kalyan Manikya	1626–1660
Govinda Manikya	1660–1661
Chhatra Manikya	1661–1667
Govinda Manikya	1661–1673
Rama Manikya	1673–1685
Ratna Manikya II	1685–1693
Narendra Manikya	1693–1695
Ratna Manikya II	1695–1712
Mahendra Manikya	1712–1714
Dharma Manikya II	1714–1725
Jagat Manikya	1725–1729
Dharma Manikya II	1729
Mukunda Manikya	1729–1739
Joy Manikya II	1739–1744
Indra Manikya II	1744–1746
Udai Manikya II	1744
Joy Manikya II	1746
Vijaya Manikya III	1746–1748
Lakshman Manikya	1740s/1750s
Interregnum	1750s–1760
Krishna Manikya	1760–1783
Rajdhar Manikya II	1785–1806
Rama Ganga Manikya	1806–1809
Durga Manikya	1809–1813
Rama Ganga Manikya	1813–1826
Kashi Chandra Manikya	1826–1829
Krishna Kishore Manikya	1829–1849
Ishan Chandra Manikya	1849–1862
Bir Chandra Manikya	1862–1896
Radha Kishore Manikya	1896–1909
Birendra Kishore Manikya	1909–1923
Bir Bikram Kishore Manikya	1923–1947
Kirit Bikram Kishore Manikya	1947–1949; 1949–1978 (titular)
Kirit Pradyot Manikya	1978–present (titular)

Tripura monarchy data
- Manikya dynasty (Royal family)
- Agartala (Capital of the kingdom)
- Ujjayanta Palace (Royal residence)
- Pushbanta Palace (Royal residence)
- Neermahal (Royal residence)
- Rajmala (Royal chronicle)
- Tripura Buranji (Chronicle)
- Chaturdasa Devata (Family deities)

Maha Manikya (died 1431), also known as Chhengthung Fa, was the Maharaja of Tripura from about 1400 to 1431. Contrary to the account in the early chronicles, evidence indicates that he founded the kingdom by establishing dominance over neighbouring tribes in the early 15th century. He is thought to have been the first hold of the title "Manikya", which he took to commemorate a victory over the neighbouring Bengal Sultanate. The dynasty which he founded kept the title until Tripura merged with India in 1949.

== Chronology and name ==
Maha Manikya is estimated to have reigned from about 1400 until 1431. The Rajmala, the royal chronicle of Tripura, contains little information regarding his life. There, he is described as the son of Mukut Manikya, himself the son of the dynasty's supposed founder, Ratna Manikya I, a descendant of the mythical Lunar dynasty. Upon ascending the throne, Maha is said to have proved himself a virtuous ruler and distinguished scholar, with no mention of any military engagements during his reign. There are notable reasons to be doubtful of the narrative provided by the Rajmala however. Numismatic evidence proves that Maha could not have been the son of Mukut, given that the latter had only begun his rule in 1489. It is further believed that Maha himself founded the dynasty and was the first to hold the title "Manikya", and that Ratna Manikya, who evidence shows reigned more than thirty years after Maha's death, was not.

Because his son Dharma Manikya I is identified with the ruler the Rajmala calls "Dangar Fa", historians equate Maha with Dangar predecessor in the text, "Chhengthung Fa". (Note: The two other rulers who are placed between Chhengthung Fa and Dangar Fa in the chronological sequence provided by the Rajmala, Achang Fa and Khiching Fa, are dismissed in this scenario. This is because they are only mentioned in passing in the text, with virtually no information provided about them, leading to the conclusion that their existence is questionable.) This was probably his originally name, since "Maha Manikya" (literally meaning "Great Manikya") (Note: "Manikya" refers to a reddish stone or ruby.) would be an unusual personal name, and "Maha" is a prefix that does not work as a given name.

== Reign ==
It is believed that Chhengthung Fa (later Maha Manikya) was a Tripuri chief who had established the Tripura kingdom in the early 15th century by subjugating neighbouring tribes, namely the Kukis, Jamatias and Reangs among others. This was possible due to the Tripuri having the largest tribal population as well as its inhabitancy of the productive and fertile valleys bordering Bengal, lying between Sylhet and Chittagong. These events are believed to have occurred around the time that Raja Ganesha had established temporary sovereignty over Bengal, when the influence of its Sultan was weak.

According to the Rajmala, Chhengthung Fa later incurred the wrath of an unidentified ruler of Bengal when a man bearing a gift for the Sultan was robbed while passing through Tripura. When he learned that a large army was dispatched against him, Chhengthung Fa was prepared to sue for peace but was prevented from doing so by his queen, Tripura Sundari. She declared submission to be an act of cowardice and convinced her husband to fight, taking command of the soldiers herself and leading them to victory over Bengal. It is likely that it was as a result of this impressive triumph that Chhengthung Fa took the title "Maha Manikya", with the "Manikya" suffix being subsequently inherited by his successors. However, due to the similarity between the coins of Sultan Jalaluddin Muhammad Shah and that of a later Tripura ruler, (Note: The coin of Jalaluddin Muhammad Shah and that of Ratna Manikya I both share the motif of a lion with a raised fore-paw.) it has been suggested that some part (or perhaps temporarily, the entirety) of the kingdom had submitted to Bengal during Maha's reign, though this is disputed among historians.

Maha died in 1431 and following a brief struggle among his children and generals, he was succeeded by his eldest son Dharma Manikya I. The descendants of another son, Gagan Fa, inherited the throne in later centuries, beginning with Kalyan Manikya in 1626.

== Bibliography ==
- Bhattacharjee, Subhadeep (2010). Energy and Power in North East India. New Delhi: Mittal Publications. ISBN 978-81-8324-338-4.
- Choudhury, Achyut Charan (2000) [1910], Srihatter Itibritta: Purbangsho (in Bengali), Kolkata: Kotha
- Durlabhendra; Sukheshwar; Baneshwar (1999), Sri Rajmala, vol. I–IV, translated by Kailāsa Candra Siṃha; N.C. Nath, Agartala: Tribal Research Institute, Govt. of Tripura
- Gan-Chaudhuri, Jagadis (1980). Tripura, the land and its people. Leeladevi Publications. ISBN 9788121004480.
- Ganguly, J. B. (1985). The Economic Content of the State Formation Process in Medieval Tripura. Proceedings of North East India History Association. Agartala: North East India History Association. Session.
- Lahiri, Bela (1999). "Numismatic Evidence on the Chronolgy and Succession of the rulers of Tripura". The Journal of the Numismatic Society of India. Numismatic Society of India.
- Momin, Mignonette; Mawlong, Cecile A.; Qādrī, Fuz̤ail Aḥmad (2006). Society and economy in North-East India. New Delhi: Regency Publications. ISBN 978-81-87498-83-4.
- Raatan, T. (2008). Encyclopaedia of North-East India. Delhi: Gyan Publishing House. ISBN 978-81-7835-068-4.
- Roychoudhury, Nalini Ranjan (1983). Tripura through the ages: a short history of Tripura from the earliest times to 1947 A.D. Sterling.
- Saha, Sudhanshu Bikash (1986). Tribes of Tripura: A Historical Survey. Rupali Book House.
- Sarma, Ramani Mohan (1987). Political History of Tripura. Puthipatra.
- Singh, Jai Prakash (1999). An Introduction to the History of the Manikyas of Tripura. Shillong: North Eastern Hill University Publications.
