= Dharma Manikya I =

Maharaja of Tripura from 1431 to 1462

Maharaja of Tripura
- Reign: 1431–1462
- Predecessor: Maha Manikya
- Successor: Ratna Manikya I
- Consort: Nanua
- Issue: Raja Fa; Agar Fa; Ratna Manikya I Fifteen other sons
- House: Manikya dynasty
- Father: Maha Manikya
- Religion: Hinduism

Kingdom of Tripura
- Part of History of Tripura
Kings of Tripura
Maha Manikya	c. 1400–1431
Dharma Manikya I	1431–1462
Ratna Manikya I	1462–1487
Pratap Manikya	1487
Vijaya Manikya I	1488
Mukut Manikya	1489
Dhanya Manikya	1490–1515
Dhwaja Manikya	1515–1520
Deva Manikya	1520–1530
Indra Manikya I	1530–1532
Vijaya Manikya II	1532–1563
Ananta Manikya	1563–1567
Udai Manikya I	1567–1573
Joy Manikya I	1573–1577
Amar Manikya	1577–1585
Rajdhar Manikya I	1586–1600
Ishwar Manikya	1600
Yashodhar Manikya	1600–1623
Interregnum	1623–1626
Kalyan Manikya	1626–1660
Govinda Manikya	1660–1661
Chhatra Manikya	1661–1667
Govinda Manikya	1661–1673
Rama Manikya	1673–1685
Ratna Manikya II	1685–1693
Narendra Manikya	1693–1695
Ratna Manikya II	1695–1712
Mahendra Manikya	1712–1714
Dharma Manikya II	1714–1725
Jagat Manikya	1725–1729
Dharma Manikya II	1729
Mukunda Manikya	1729–1739
Joy Manikya II	1739–1744
Indra Manikya II	1744–1746
Udai Manikya II	1744
Joy Manikya II	1746
Vijaya Manikya III	1746–1748
Lakshman Manikya	1740s/1750s
Interregnum	1750s–1760
Krishna Manikya	1760–1783
Rajdhar Manikya II	1785–1806
Rama Ganga Manikya	1806–1809
Durga Manikya	1809–1813
Rama Ganga Manikya	1813–1826
Kashi Chandra Manikya	1826–1829
Krishna Kishore Manikya	1829–1849
Ishan Chandra Manikya	1849–1862
Bir Chandra Manikya	1862–1896
Birendra Kishore Manikya	1909–1923
Bir Bikram Kishore Manikya	1923–1947
Kirit Bikram Kishore Manikya	1947–1949; 1949–1978 (titular)
Kirit Pradyot Manikya	1978–present (titular)

Tripura monarchy data
- Manikya dynasty (Royal family)
- Agartala (Capital of the kingdom)
- Ujjayanta Palace (Royal residence)
- Pushbanta Palace (Royal residence)
- Neermahal (Royal residence)
- Rajmala (Royal chronicle)
- Tripura Buranji (Chronicle)
- Chaturdasa Devata (Family deities)

Dharma Manikya I, also known as Dangar Fa, was the Maharaja of Tripura from 1431 to 1462. His reign was notable for its territorial expansions as well as for his religious and cultural contributions.

== Ascension ==
The eldest of the five sons of his father Maha Manikya, Dharma was not initially intended to inherit the throne. According to court histories, he had originally decided on a monastic life, abandoning material desires and embarking on pilgrimages as an itinerant mendicant. It was while he was visiting the holy city of Benares in 1431 that he received news of his father's death, as well as of the violent struggle for the vacant throne which had ensued among his brothers and the military leaders. The story continues that accompanied by eight Brahmins, Dharma hastened back to Tripura. There he was welcomed by the people and unanimously chosen as the next ruler.

== Reign ==
Early in Dharma's reign, his territories were invaded by the Sultan of Bengal, Shamsuddin Ahmad Shah, who compelled a tribute of money and elephants. In turn, Dharma launched his own assault, occupying and plundering the city of Sonargaon. Further Bengali lands were attacked by his armies, with Patrikara, Gangamandal, Meherkul and Khandal all being annexed into Tripura. Around this time, Min Saw Mon, the exiled ruler of Arakan, visited the royal court. Dharma contributed both financially and militarily to the former's reconquest of his kingdom.

Traditions describe Dharma as a powerful administrator as well as a patron of learning and culture; the latter of which is most evident in his commissioning of the Rajmala, a history of the Manikya dynasty. His religious zeal is also notable, shown both through donations of large amounts of lands to Brahmins, as well as by his construction projects, which include temples and the famous Dharmasagar tank in Comilla.

== Overthrow and death ==
Numismatic evidence suggests that Dharma is identical to the Tripura ruler referred to in the Rajmala as "Dangar Fa". This is due to coins bearing the name of Dangar Fa's supposed son and successor, Ratna Manikya I (mistakenly identified as Dharma's great-grandfather in the text), place the latter's reign as being immediately after that of Dharma. This would suggest that Dharma was in fact Ratna Manikya's father and that episodes linked with "Dangar Fa" in the Rajmala are instead associated with him.

Thus, according to the events narrated in the chronicle, Dharma divided his kingdom into seventeen parts, each to be parcelled to all but the youngest of his eighteen sons. (Note: This was presumably done in fear of another fratricidal struggle over the succession.) The shunned son, Ratna, was instead given as a hostage to the Sultan of Bengal, Rukunuddin Barbak Shah. However, Ratna allied with the Sultan and launched an invasion of Tripura, defeating his father and brothers. While his other sons were imprisoned, Dharma himself was expelled from the kingdom by the new monarch. He eventually died in exile on the Thanamchi hill, to the east of Tripura. (Note: The Rajmala makes no mention of Dharma being overthrown and exiled, instead merely stating that he had died of smallpox.)

== Bibliography ==
- Bhattacharyya, Banikantha (1986). Tripura Administration: The Era of Modernisation, 1870–1972. Delhi: Mittal Publications.
- Chib, Sukhdev Singh (1988). Tripura. Ess Ess Publications. ISBN 978-81-7000-039-6.
- Durlabhendra; Sukheshwar; Baneshwar (1999), Sri Rajmala, vol. I–IV, translated by Kailāsa Candra Siṃha; N.C. Nath, Agartala: Tribal Research Institute, Govt. of Tripura
- Gan-Chaudhuri, Jagadis (1980). Tripura, the land and its people. Leeladevi Publications. ISBN 9788121004480.
- Ghoshal, Anindita (2018). Tejimala Gurung (ed.). In the Belly of the Tiger, almost: Mughal-Tripura Interface in the Eighteenth Century. DVS Publishers. ISBN 978-93-85839-12-2.
- Goswami, Debabrata (1996). Military History of Tripura, 1490–1947. Agartala: Tripura State Tribal Cultural Research Institute & Museum, Government of Tripura.
- Ray, Ajay (1976). Tripura, the Enchanting Land. Directorate of Public Relations & Tourism, Government of Tripura.
- Saha, Sudhanshu Bikash (1986). Tribes of Tripura: A Historical Survey. Agartala: Rupali Book House.
- Sarma, Ramani Mohan (1987). Political History of Tripura. Puthipatra.
- Singh, G. P. (1980). The Turko-Afghan and Mughal invasions of Tripura (Hill-Tipperah) Raj (1240–1733 A.D.). The Journal of the Assam Research Society. Kāmarūpa Anusandhān Samiti.
- Sur, Hirendra Kumar (1986). British Relations with the State of Tripura, 1760–1947. Saraswati Book Depot.
