= Rama Manikya =

Maharaja of Tripura
- Reign: 1676–1685
- Predecessor: Govinda Manikya
- Successor: Ratna Manikya II
- Died: 1685
- Consort: Ratnavati
- Issue: Ratna Manikya II; Mahendra Manikya; Dharma Manikya II; Mukunda Manikya
- House: Manikya dynasty
- Father: Govinda Manikya
- Religion: Hinduism

Kingdom of Tripura
- Part of History of Tripura
Kings of Tripura
Maha Manikya	c. 1400–1431
Dharma Manikya I	1431–1462
Ratna Manikya I	1462–1487
Pratap Manikya	1487
Vijaya Manikya I	1488
Mukut Manikya	1489
Dhanya Manikya	1490–1515
Dhwaja Manikya	1515–1520
Deva Manikya	1520–1530
Indra Manikya I	1530–1532
Vijaya Manikya II	1532–1563
Ananta Manikya	1563–1567
Udai Manikya I	1567–1573
Joy Manikya I	1573–1577
Amar Manikya	1577–1585
Rajdhar Manikya I	1586–1600
Ishwar Manikya	1600
Yashodhar Manikya	1600–1623
Interregnum	1623–1626
Kalyan Manikya	1626–1660
Govinda Manikya	1660–1661
Chhatra Manikya	1661–1667
Govinda Manikya	1661–1673
Rama Manikya	1673–1685
Ratna Manikya II	1685–1693
Narendra Manikya	1693–1695
Ratna Manikya II	1695–1712
Mahendra Manikya	1712–1714
Dharma Manikya II	1714–1725
Jagat Manikya	1725–1729
Dharma Manikya II	1729
Mukunda Manikya	1729–1739
Joy Manikya II	1739–1744
Indra Manikya II	1744–1746
Udai Manikya II	1744
Joy Manikya II	1746
Vijaya Manikya III	1746–1748
Lakshman Manikya	1740s/1750s
Interregnum	1750s–1760
Krishna Manikya	1760–1783
Rajdhar Manikya II	1785–1806
Rama Ganga Manikya	1806–1809
Durga Manikya	1809–1813
Rama Ganga Manikya	1813–1826
Kashi Chandra Manikya	1826–1829
Krishna Kishore Manikya	1829–1849
Ishan Chandra Manikya	1849–1862
Bir Chandra Manikya	1862–1896
Radha Kishore Manikya	1896–1909
Birendra Kishore Manikya	1909–1923
Bir Bikram Kishore Manikya	1923–1947
Kirit Bikram Kishore Manikya	1947–1949; 1949–1978 (titular)
Kirit Pradyot Manikya	1978–present (titular)

Tripura monarchy data
- Manikya dynasty (Royal family)
- Agartala (Capital of the kingdom)
- Ujjayanta Palace (Royal residence)
- Pushbanta Palace (Royal residence)
- Neermahal (Royal residence)
- Rajmala (Royal chronicle)
- Tripura Buranji (Chronicle)
- Chaturdasa Devata (Family deities)

Rama Manikya (d. 1685), also called Ram Manikya or Ramdev Manikya, was the Maharaja of Tripura from 1676 to 1685.

== Life ==
The eldest son of Maharaja Govinda Manikya, as a prince Rama acted as one of his father's military commanders. In December 1661, he was dispatched against his rebellious uncle Nakshatra Roy and engaged him in the Battle of Amtali, during which Rama was defeated. This loss forced his father to temporarily abandon the throne and leave Tripura for a number of years.

Following Govinda's death in 1676, Rama ascended the throne, though he soon faced rebellion from his nephew Dwarika Thakur. The latter assumed the royal title Narendra Manikya and with the aid of Nasir Muhammad, the Afghan Nawab of Sarail, overthrew Rama. The deposed king turned to the Mughal governor of Bengal, Shaista Khan, for aid. The latter dispatched his army in Rama's support, allowing him to recapture the throne, with Khan taking Narendra captive to Dhaka.

At some point, Rama led an incursion north towards Sylhet, reaching as far as the city borders. In Tripura itself, he performed extensive infrastructure development, excavating several tanks (reservoirs) and erecting temples. One such was in honour of Vishnu (suggesting a personal affinity with Vaishnavism) (Note: A patronage of Shaivism is also implied by the mention of Shiva on his coinage.) as well as repairing the Temple of Tripura Sundari, which had previously been damaged from lightning strike. Many villages located throughout modern-day Tripura State and Bangladesh are named in his honour.

Rama died in old age in 1685, with his consort Ratnavati performing Sati in his funeral pyre. He was succeeded by his son Ratna Manikya II, at the time only five years old.
