= Ananta Manikya =

Maharaja of Tripura (1563–1567)

Maharaja of Tripura
- Reign: 1563–1567
- Predecessor: Vijaya Manikya II
- Successor: Udai Manikya
- Died: 1567
- Consort: Ratnavati
- House: Manikya dynasty
- Father: Vijaya Manikya II
- Religion: Hinduism

Kingdom of Tripura
- Part of History of Tripura
Kings of Tripura
| Maha Manikya | c. 1400–1431 |
| Dharma Manikya I | 1431–1462 |
| Ratna Manikya I | 1462–1487 |
| Pratap Manikya | 1487 |
| Vijaya Manikya I | 1488 |
| Mukut Manikya | 1489 |
| Dhanya Manikya | 1490–1515 |
| Dhwaja Manikya | 1515–1520 |
| Deva Manikya | 1520–1530 |
| Indra Manikya I | 1530–1532 |
| Vijaya Manikya II | 1532–1563 |
| Ananta Manikya | 1563–1567 |
| Udai Manikya I | 1567–1573 |
| Joy Manikya I | 1573–1577 |
| Amar Manikya | 1577–1585 |
| Rajdhar Manikya I | 1586–1600 |
| Ishwar Manikya | 1600 |
| Yashodhar Manikya | 1600–1623 |
| Interregnum | 1623–1626 |
| Kalyan Manikya | 1626–1660 |
| Govinda Manikya | 1660–1661 |
| Chhatra Manikya | 1661–1667 |
| Govinda Manikya | 1661–1673 |
| Rama Manikya | 1673–1685 |
| Ratna Manikya II | 1685–1693 |
| Narendra Manikya | 1693–1695 |
| Ratna Manikya II | 1695–1712 |
| Mahendra Manikya | 1712–1714 |
| Dharma Manikya II | 1714–1725 |
| Jagat Manikya | 1725–1729 |
| Dharma Manikya II | 1729 |
| Mukunda Manikya | 1729–1739 |
| Joy Manikya II | 1739–1744 |
| Indra Manikya II | 1744–1746 |
| Udai Manikya II | 1744 |
| Joy Manikya II | 1746 |
| Vijaya Manikya III | 1746–1748 |
| Lakshman Manikya | 1740s/1750s |
| Interregnum | 1750s–1760 |
| Krishna Manikya | 1760–1783 |
| Rajdhar Manikya II | 1785–1806 |
| Rama Ganga Manikya | 1806–1809 |
| Durga Manikya | 1809–1813 |
| Rama Ganga Manikya | 1813–1826 |
| Kashi Chandra Manikya | 1826–1829 |
| Krishna Kishore Manikya | 1829–1849 |
| Ishan Chandra Manikya | 1849–1862 |
| Bir Chandra Manikya | 1862–1896 |
| Radha Kishore Manikya | 1896–1909 |
| Birendra Kishore Manikya | 1909–1923 |
| Bir Bikram Kishore Manikya | 1923–1947 |
| Kirit Bikram Kishore Manikya | 1947–1949; 1949–1978 (titular) |
| Kirit Pradyot Manikya | 1978–present (titular) |

Tripura monarchy data
- Manikya dynasty (Royal family)
- Agartala (Capital of the kingdom)
- Ujjayanta Palace (Royal residence)
- Pushbanta Palace (Royal residence)
- Neermahal (Royal residence)
- Rajmala (Royal chronicle)
- Tripura Buranji (Chronicle)
- Chaturdasa Devata (Family deities)

Ananta Manikya (d. 1567) was the Maharaja of Tripura from 1563 to 1567. A weak monarch in comparison to his predecessor, he spent his reign under the control of his influential father-in-law. He died after only a few short years of rule, potentially at the latter's hands.

== Life ==
Despite being born the second son of Maharaja Vijaya Manikya II, Ananta was named heir apparent by his father, his elder brother Dangar Fa having been sent to live at the court of Mukunda Deva of Odisha. The reason for this unusual succession is disputed, with the former either having been viewed as possessing the greater physical strength to rule or being born with a more auspicious horoscope.

Following Vijaya's death in 1563, Ananta inherited an extensive and well-consolidated kingdom. Described by historian Dambarudhar Nath as having been "an unworthy son of a worthy father", he proved himself to be a poor monarch, being entirely under the power of his father-in-law, the Commander-in-Chief Gopi Prasad.

According to the Darrang Raj Vamsavali, a Koch royal chronicle, the Koch king Nara Narayan and his brother Chilarai invaded Tripura around this period. The ruler of Tripura at this point, tentatively identified as Ananta, is stated to have suffered a devastating defeat at their hands, losing up to 18,000 soldiers. However, the authenticity of this text is controversial, leading to the events narrated being viewed with some scepticism.

Ananta reigned only briefly, dying in 1567. The manner of his death is uncertain, with different versions of the Rajmala either stating that it was the result of fever or that he was strangled on the orders of Gopi Prasad. Regardless, the latter afterwards claimed the throne, adopting the name Udai Manikya. Ananta's wife Ratnavati, the new king's daughter, attempted to perform Sati on his funeral pyre, though was prevented from doing so by her father. She was later appeased by being named queen of Chandipur.
