= Govinda Manikya =

Maharaja of Tripura
- 1st reign: 1660–1661
- Predecessor: Kalyan Manikya
- Successor: Chhatra Manikya
- 2nd reign: 1667–1676
- Predecessor: Chhatra Manikya
- Successor: Rama Manikya
- Died: 1676
- Consort: Gunavati Mahadevi
- Issue: Rama Manikya; Durga Thakur
- House: Manikya dynasty
- Father: Kalyan Manikya
- Mother: Saharavati
- Religion: Hinduism

Kingdom of Tripura
- Part of History of Tripura
Kings of Tripura
Maha Manikya	c. 1400–1431
Dharma Manikya I	1431–1462
Ratna Manikya I	1462–1487
Pratap Manikya	1487
Vijaya Manikya I	1488
Mukut Manikya	1489
Dhanya Manikya	1490–1515
Dhwaja Manikya	1515–1520
Deva Manikya	1520–1530
Indra Manikya I	1530–1532
Vijaya Manikya II	1532–1563
Ananta Manikya	1563–1567
Udai Manikya I	1567–1573
Joy Manikya I	1573–1577
Amar Manikya	1577–1585
Rajdhar Manikya I	1586–1600
Ishwar Manikya	1600
Yashodhar Manikya	1600–1623
Interregnum	1623–1626
Kalyan Manikya	1626–1660
Govinda Manikya	1660–1661
Chhatra Manikya	1661–1667
Govinda Manikya	1661–1673
Rama Manikya	1673–1685
Ratna Manikya II	1685–1693
Narendra Manikya	1693–1695
Ratna Manikya II	1695–1712
Mahendra Manikya	1712–1714
Dharma Manikya II	1714–1725
Jagat Manikya	1725–1729
Dharma Manikya II	1729
Mukunda Manikya	1729–1739
Joy Manikya II	1739–1744
Indra Manikya II	1744–1746
Udai Manikya II	1744
Joy Manikya II	1746
Vijaya Manikya III	1746–1748
Lakshman Manikya	1740s/1750s
Interregnum	1750s–1760
Krishna Manikya	1760–1783
Rajdhar Manikya II	1785–1806
Rama Ganga Manikya	1806–1809
Durga Manikya	1809–1813
Rama Ganga Manikya	1813–1826
Kashi Chandra Manikya	1826–1829
Krishna Kishore Manikya	1829–1849
Ishan Chandra Manikya	1849–1862
Bir Chandra Manikya	1862–1896
Radha Kishore Manikya	1896–1909
Birendra Kishore Manikya	1909–1923
Bir Bikram Kishore Manikya	1923–1947
Kirit Bikram Kishore Manikya	1947–1949; 1949–1978 (titular)
Kirit Pradyot Manikya	1978–present (titular)

Tripura monarchy data
- Manikya dynasty (Royal family)
- Agartala (Capital of the kingdom)
- Ujjayanta Palace (Royal residence)
- Pushbanta Palace (Royal residence)
- Neermahal (Royal residence)
- Rajmala (Royal chronicle)
- Tripura Buranji (Chronicle)
- Chaturdasa Devata (Family deities)

Govinda Manikya (d. 1676) was the Maharaja of Tripura from 1660 to 1661 and again from 1667 to 1676. Though viewed as a capable and successful ruler, Govinda's reign was interrupted by his temporary overthrow and usurpation by his younger brother.

== Life ==
The eldest son of Maharaja Kalyan Manikya, Govinda succeeded upon the latter's death in 1660. However, he was overthrown within a year of his ascension by his brother, Chhatra Manikya, who claimed the throne with the aid of the Mughal Empire, forcing Govinda into exile.

Govinda fled into the Chittagong Hill Tracts where, according to the Rajmala, he developed a friendship with Shah Shuja, the similarly exiled brother of the Mughal emperor Aurangzeb. However, chronological data indicates that a meeting between the two princes is impossible. Govinda later took refuge in Arakan, whose ruler aided him in recovering Tripura in 1667. Accounts are contradictory regarding whether Govinda had Chhatra killed at this point, or if the latter had already died previously.

To placate the Mughals, at whose behest his brother had become ruler, Govinda agreed to send five elephants annually as tribute to the emperor. Govinda generally maintained good relations with the empire, with Tripura being able to enjoy a de facto independent status. He is viewed as having been an able administrator, as well as a patron of the arts and learning. During his reign, the third section of the Rajmala was completed and the Brihannaradiya Purana was translated into Bengali.

Govinda died in 1676 and was succeeded by his son Rama Manikya. Centuries later, he was immortalised by his depictions in the plays of Rabindranath Tagore, Visharjan and Rajarshi.
