= Narendra Manikya =

Maharaja of Tripura
- Reign: 1693–1695
- Predecessor: Ratna Manikya II
- Successor: Ratna Manikya II
- Born: Dwarika Thakur
- Died: 1695
- House: Manikya Dynasty
- Father: Durga Thakur
- Religion: Hinduism

Kingdom of Tripura
- Part of History of Tripura
Kings of Tripura
Maha Manikya	c. 1400–1431
Dharma Manikya I	1431–1462
Ratna Manikya I	1462–1487
Pratap Manikya	1487
Vijaya Manikya I	1488
Mukut Manikya	1489
Dhanya Manikya	1490–1515
Dhwaja Manikya	1515–1520
Deva Manikya	1520–1530
Indra Manikya I	1530–1532
Vijaya Manikya II	1532–1563
Ananta Manikya	1563–1567
Udai Manikya I	1567–1573
Joy Manikya I	1573–1577
Amar Manikya	1577–1585
Rajdhar Manikya I	1586–1600
Ishwar Manikya	1600
Yashodhar Manikya	1600–1623
Interregnum	1623–1626
Kalyan Manikya	1626–1660
Govinda Manikya	1660–1661
Chhatra Manikya	1661–1667
Govinda Manikya	1661–1673
Rama Manikya	1673–1685
Ratna Manikya II	1685–1693
Narendra Manikya	1693–1695
Ratna Manikya II	1695–1712
Mahendra Manikya	1712–1714
Dharma Manikya II	1714–1725
Jagat Manikya	1725–1729
Dharma Manikya II	1729
Mukunda Manikya	1729–1739
Joy Manikya II	1739–1744
Indra Manikya II	1744–1746
Udai Manikya II	1744
Joy Manikya II	1746
Vijaya Manikya III	1746–1748
Lakshman Manikya	1740s/1750s
Interregnum	1750s–1760
Krishna Manikya	1760–1783
Rajdhar Manikya II	1785–1806
Rama Ganga Manikya	1806–1809
Durga Manikya	1809–1813
Rama Ganga Manikya	1813–1826
Kashi Chandra Manikya	1826–1829
Krishna Kishore Manikya	1829–1849
Ishan Chandra Manikya	1849–1862
Bir Chandra Manikya	1862–1896
Birendra Kishore Manikya	1909–1923
Bir Bikram Kishore Manikya	1923–1947
Kirit Bikram Kishore Manikya	1947–1949; 1949–1978 (titular)
Kirit Pradyot Manikya	1978–present (titular)

Tripura monarchy data
- Manikya dynasty (Royal family)
- Agartala (Capital of the kingdom)
- Ujjayanta Palace (Royal residence)
- Pushbanta Palace (Royal residence)
- Neermahal (Royal residence)
- Rajmala (Royal chronicle)
- Tripura Buranji (Chronicle)
- Chaturdasa Devata (Family deities)

Narendra Manikya (d. 1695) was the Maharaja of Tripura from 1693 to 1695.

== Life ==
Born Dwarika Thakur, he was the son of the Tripuri prince Durga Thakur, himself a son of Maharaja Govinda Manikya. Soon after his grandfather's death and the ascension of his uncle Rama Manikya in 1676, Dwarika made an attempt to claim the throne for himself. Allied with Muhammad Nasir, the Afghan chief of Sarail, Dwarika was able to dislodge Rama and assumed the regnal name Narendra Manikya. However his uncle, having found aid from the Mughal governor of Bengal, Shaista Khan, returned with the Bengali army, suppressing Narendra's rebellion and reclaiming power.

Narendra, having been captured, was taken by the Mughals to Dhaka, where he was able to eventually cultivate a friendship with Khan. Following Rama's death in 1685, his young son Ratna Manikya II inherited the throne. However, the latter earned Khan's ire after having attacked Sylhet, then under Mughal control. In response, Khan successfully invaded Tripura in 1693, with Narendra aiding in the assault. For his assistance, the governor installed the latter as ruler in his defeated cousin's place. In return, Narendra agreed to give two more elephants to the Mughals in addition to Tripura's regular tribute, with one further being exclusively presented to Khan. Narendra kept his young predecessor by his side, whom he treated affectionately.

However, his reign proved to be short lived. Champak Ray, who had been Dewan under Ratna, (Note: Ray was also a nephew of Govinda Manikya) fled to Dhaka to avoid capture by the new ruler. There, he, alongside Ratna's younger brother and a Tripuri general named Mir Khan, influenced Shaista Khan to provide military support against Narendra. They led a large invasion force into Tripura and, in the sanguinary Battle of Chandigarh, defeated Narendra. The latter was subsequently killed, having reigned for about three years, with the throne then being restored to Ratna.
