= Birendra Kishore Manikya =

H.R.H. Maharaja Birendra Kishore Manikya Dev Varma Bahadur
- Maharaja
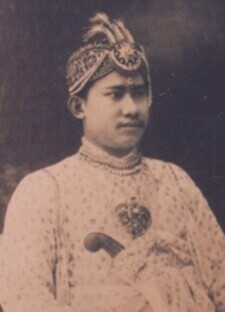
- Reign: 1909-1923
- Predecessor: Radha Kishore Manikya
- Successor: Bir Bikram Kishore Manikya Bahadur
- House: Manikya dynasty
- Religion: Hinduism

Kingdom of Tripura
- Part of History of Tripura
Kings of Tripura
Maha Manikya	c. 1400–1431
Dharma Manikya I	1431–1462
Ratna Manikya I	1462–1487
Pratap Manikya	1487
Vijaya Manikya I	1488
Mukut Manikya	1489
Dhanya Manikya	1490–1515
Dhwaja Manikya	1515–1520
Deva Manikya	1520–1530
Indra Manikya I	1530–1532
Vijaya Manikya II	1532–1563
Ananta Manikya	1563–1567
Udai Manikya I	1567–1573
Joy Manikya I	1573–1577
Amar Manikya	1577–1585
Rajdhar Manikya I	1586–1600
Ishwar Manikya	1600
Yashodhar Manikya	1600–1623
Interregnum	1623–1626
Kalyan Manikya	1626–1660
Govinda Manikya	1660–1661
Chhatra Manikya	1661–1667
Govinda Manikya	1661–1673
Rama Manikya	1673–1685
Ratna Manikya II	1685–1693
Narendra Manikya	1693–1695
Ratna Manikya II	1695–1712
Mahendra Manikya	1712–1714
Dharma Manikya II	1714–1725
Jagat Manikya	1725–1729
Dharma Manikya II	1729
Mukunda Manikya	1729–1739
Joy Manikya II	1739–1744
Indra Manikya II	1744–1746
Udai Manikya II	1744
Joy Manikya II	1746
Vijaya Manikya III	1746–1748
Lakshman Manikya	1740s/1750s
Interregnum	1750s–1760
Krishna Manikya	1760–1783
Rajdhar Manikya II	1785–1806
Rama Ganga Manikya	1806–1809
Durga Manikya	1809–1813
Rama Ganga Manikya	1813–1826
Kashi Chandra Manikya	1826–1829
Krishna Kishore Manikya	1829–1849
Ishan Chandra Manikya	1849–1862
Bir Chandra Manikya	1862–1896
Radha Kishore Manikya	1896–1909
Birendra Kishore Manikya	1909–1923
Bir Bikram Kishore Manikya	1923–1947
Kirit Bikram Kishore Manikya	1947–1949; 1949–1978 (titular)
Kirit Pradyot Manikya	1978–present (titular)

Tripura monarchy data
- Manikya dynasty (Royal family)
- Agartala (Capital of the kingdom)
- Ujjayanta Palace (Royal residence)
- Pushbanta Palace (Royal residence)
- Neermahal (Royal residence)
- Rajmala (Royal chronicle)
- Tripura Buranji (Chronicle)
- Chaturdasa Devata (Family deities)

Birendra Kishore Manikya Dev Varma Bahadur ascended the throne of the Kingdom of Tripura on 25 November 1909, at the age of 26.

== Administrative reforms ==
Birendra Kishore's contribution to the state lay in his administrative reforms, welfare activities and consistent attempt to spread education. He divided the state into ten administrative units on the model of subdivisions and introduced the system of civil service examinations for recruiting competent youths in the administration in 1909. The post of chief secretary was created in 1909.

He reconstituted the State Civil Service in 1909 for recruitment of high officials of the state including the post of Police Superintendent and Deputy Superintendent of Police. The new Arms Act and the Penal Code Amendment Act were passed in 1911. A small staff under a senior Inspector was engaged for detective purposes. The number of cases reported in the state was always small.

Birendra Kishore took the first initiative to explore the potential of tea cultivation in Tripura by ordering an expert survey. Forty tea estates were set up in Tripura during his rule. The king had given a formal license to the Burma Oil Company in 1916 to explore oil, natural gas and minerals in Tripura after a survey conducted had given indication of potential deposits. He also founded a silk-weaving center at Agartala and took steps to develop agriculture.

== Patron of the arts ==
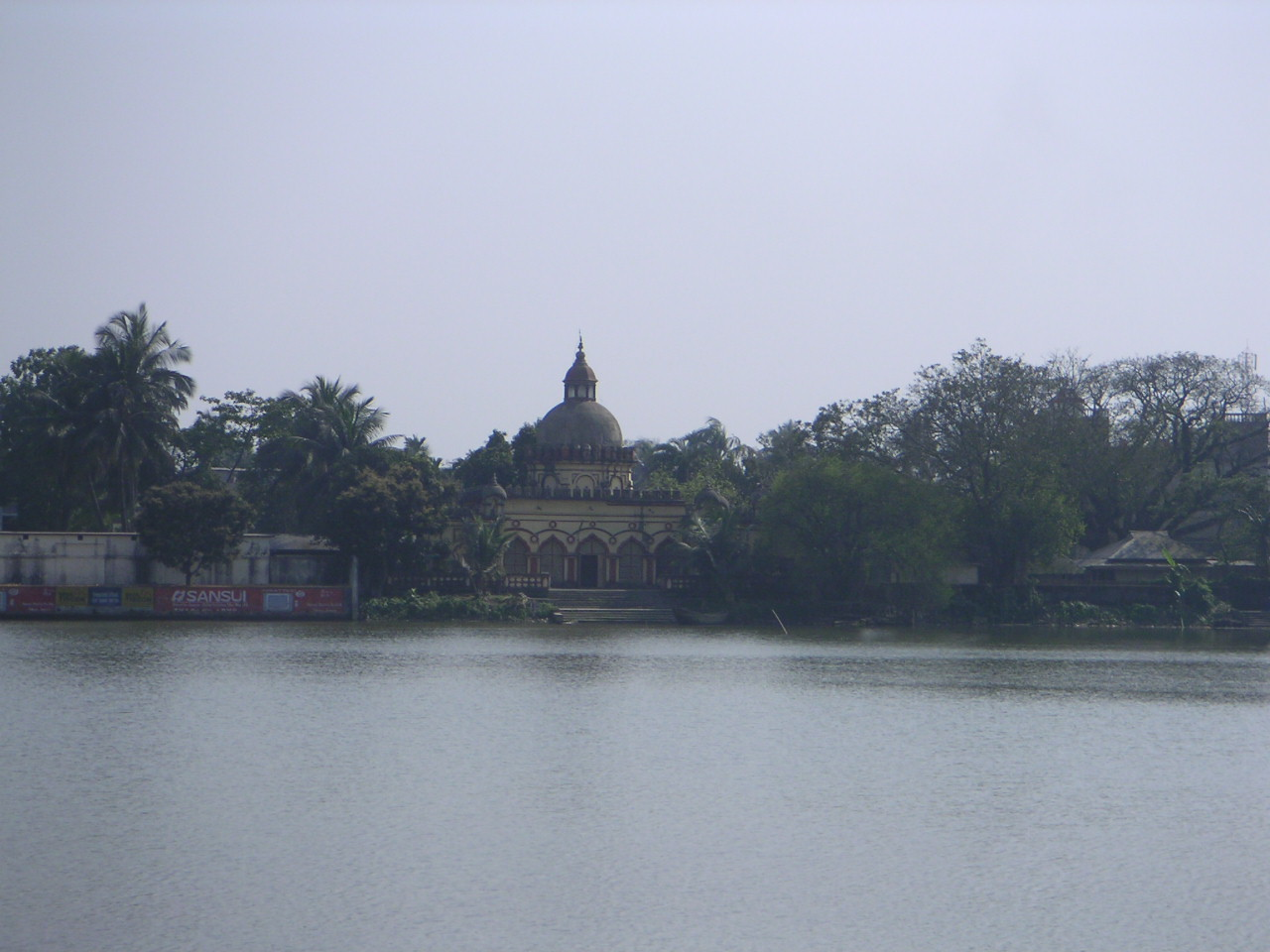
Lakshmi Narayan Temple built by Birendra Kishore Manikya

An artist and prolific songwriter, Birendra Kishore was known for his beautiful oil paintings such as "Sannyasi", "Jhulon" and "Banshi Badan". He founded the Ujjayanta Drama company giving an impetus to the development of theatre in Tripura. The Lakshmi Narayan Temple, 'Durga Bari' and 'Lal Mahal' that form part of the Ujjayanta palace were built during his rule. He built the Pushbanta Place that is now the residence of the Governor of Tripura. King Birendra Kishore organised a grand reception for Rabindra Nath Tagore at Agartala after he had won the Nobel Prize in Literature in 1913. Apart from providing ongoing financial assistance to Shanti Niketan he also donated 5,000 rupees to Tagore for setting up a hospital at Santi Niketan.
