= Kalyan Manikya =

Maharaja of Tripura
- Reign: 1626–1660
- Predecessor: Mughal interregnum
- Successor: Govinda Manikya
- Died: 16 June 1660
- Wives: Kalavati; Saharavati
- Issue: Govinda Manikya; Jagannath; Chhatra Manikya; Mathuresa; Yadava; Balai
- House: Manikya dynasty
- Father: Kachu Fa
- Religion: Hinduism

Kingdom of Tripura
- Part of History of Tripura
Kings of Tripura
Maha Manikya	c. 1400–1431
Dharma Manikya I	1431–1462
Ratna Manikya I	1462–1487
Pratap Manikya	1487
Vijaya Manikya I	1488
Mukut Manikya	1489
Dhanya Manikya	1490–1515
Dhwaja Manikya	1515–1520
Deva Manikya	1520–1530
Indra Manikya I	1530–1532
Vijaya Manikya II	1532–1563
Ananta Manikya	1563–1567
Udai Manikya I	1567–1573
Joy Manikya I	1573–1577
Amar Manikya	1577–1585
Rajdhar Manikya I	1586–1600
Ishwar Manikya	1600
Yashodhar Manikya	1600–1623
Interregnum	1623–1626
Kalyan Manikya	1626–1660
Govinda Manikya	1660–1661
Chhatra Manikya	1661–1667
Govinda Manikya	1661–1673
Rama Manikya	1673–1685
Ratna Manikya II	1685–1693
Narendra Manikya	1693–1695
Ratna Manikya II	1695–1712
Mahendra Manikya	1712–1714
Dharma Manikya II	1714–1725
Jagat Manikya	1725–1729
Dharma Manikya II	1729
Mukunda Manikya	1729–1739
Joy Manikya II	1739–1744
Indra Manikya II	1744–1746
Udai Manikya II	1744
Joy Manikya II	1746
Vijaya Manikya III	1746–1748
Lakshman Manikya	1740s/1750s
Interregnum	1750s–1760
Krishna Manikya	1760–1783
Rajdhar Manikya II	1785–1806
Rama Ganga Manikya	1806–1809
Durga Manikya	1809–1813
Rama Ganga Manikya	1813–1826
Kashi Chandra Manikya	1826–1829
Krishna Kishore Manikya	1829–1849
Ishan Chandra Manikya	1849–1862
Bir Chandra Manikya	1862–1896
Radha Kishore Manikya	1896–1909
Birendra Kishore Manikya	1909–1923
Bir Bikram Kishore Manikya	1923–1947
Kirit Bikram Kishore Manikya	1947–1949; 1949–1978 (titular)
Kirit Pradyot Manikya	1978–present (titular)

Tripura monarchy data
- Manikya dynasty (Royal family)
- Agartala (Capital of the kingdom)
- Ujjayanta Palace (Royal residence)
- Pushbanta Palace (Royal residence)
- Neermahal (Royal residence)
- Rajmala (Royal chronicle)
- Tripura Buranji (Chronicle)
- Chaturdasa Devata (Family deities)

Kalyan Manikya (died 1660) was the Maharaja of Tripura from 1626 to 1660. Reigning in the aftermath of an occupation by the Mughal Empire, Kalyan did much to restore the kingdom, though it remained in a continuous state of war with the Mughals.

== Reign ==
Kalyan was born into a branch of the Manikya dynasty, with his father Kachu Fa being a descendant of Gagan Fa, himself a son of Maha Manikya. Upon the capture of Tripura by the Mughals in 1618, Yashodhar Manikya, prior to his expulsion from the kingdom, named Kalyan his heir, due to the former's lack of close male relatives. Following the Mughal's retreat after a deadly epidemic in the region, the Tripuri nobles appointed Kalyan as the new ruler in 1626, confirming his previous nomination.

During his reign, Kalyan extensively worked to restore order to the kingdom. The administration was reorganised and improvements were made to the military, allowing the recapture of previously lost territory. He was also devoted to religious pursuits, having constructed a temple to Kali as well as donating lands to Brahmins.

Like his predecessor, Kalyan refused to pay tribute to the Mughals, resulting in repeated attacks against the kingdom, which he was initially able to repulse. However, he was ultimately defeated by Prince Shah Shuja in 1658. Tripura was subsequently added to the Mughal revenue roll under the name "Sarkar Udaipur" and Kalyan was required to give up his son Nakshatra Roy (later known as Chhatra Manikya) as a hostage to Shuja's court.

After his death in 1660, Tripura, already weakened by war, was further subjected to a fratricidal succession struggle amongst Kalyan's sons.
