= Ratna Manikya II =

Maharaja of Tripura
- 1st reign: 1685–1693
- Predecessor: Rama Manikya
- Successor: Narendra Manikya
- 2nd reign: 1695–1712
- Predecessor: Narendra Manikya
- Successor: Mahendra Manikya
- Born: Ratnadev c. 1680
- Died: 1712 (aged 31–32)
- Wives: Satyavati; Bhagavati; 118 other wives
- House: Manikya dynasty
- Father: Rama Manikya
- Religion: Hinduism

Kingdom of Tripura
- Part of History of Tripura
Kings of Tripura
Maha Manikya	c. 1400–1431
Dharma Manikya I	1431–1462
Ratna Manikya I	1462–1487
Pratap Manikya	1487
Vijaya Manikya I	1488
Mukut Manikya	1489
Dhanya Manikya	1490–1515
Dhwaja Manikya	1515–1520
Deva Manikya	1520–1530
Indra Manikya I	1530–1532
Vijaya Manikya II	1532–1563
Ananta Manikya	1563–1567
Udai Manikya I	1567–1573
Joy Manikya I	1573–1577
Amar Manikya	1577–1585
Rajdhar Manikya I	1586–1600
Ishwar Manikya	1600
Yashodhar Manikya	1600–1623
Interregnum	1623–1626
Kalyan Manikya	1626–1660
Govinda Manikya	1660–1661
Chhatra Manikya	1661–1667
Govinda Manikya	1661–1673
Rama Manikya	1673–1685
Ratna Manikya II	1685–1693
Narendra Manikya	1693–1695
Ratna Manikya II	1695–1712
Mahendra Manikya	1712–1714
Dharma Manikya II	1714–1725
Jagat Manikya	1725–1729
Dharma Manikya II	1729
Mukunda Manikya	1729–1739
Joy Manikya II	1739–1744
Indra Manikya II	1744–1746
Udai Manikya II	1744
Joy Manikya II	1746
Vijaya Manikya III	1746–1748
Lakshman Manikya	1740s/1750s
Interregnum	1750s–1760
Krishna Manikya	1760–1783
Rajdhar Manikya II	1785–1806
Rama Ganga Manikya	1806–1809
Durga Manikya	1809–1813
Rama Ganga Manikya	1813–1826
Kashi Chandra Manikya	1826–1829
Krishna Kishore Manikya	1829–1849
Ishan Chandra Manikya	1849–1862
Bir Chandra Manikya	1862–1896
Radha Kishore Manikya	1896–1909
Birendra Kishore Manikya	1909–1923
Bir Bikram Kishore Manikya	1923–1947
Kirit Bikram Kishore Manikya	1947–1949; 1949–1978 (titular)
Kirit Pradyot Manikya	1978–present (titular)

Tripura monarchy data
- Manikya dynasty (Royal family)
- Agartala (Capital of the kingdom)
- Ujjayanta Palace (Royal residence)
- Pushbanta Palace (Royal residence)
- Neermahal (Royal residence)
- Rajmala (Royal chronicle)
- Tripura Buranji (Chronicle)
- Chaturdasa Devata (Family deities)

Ratna Manikya II (c. 1680 – 1712) was the Maharaja of Tripura from 1685 to 1693 and again from 1695 to 1712.

Only a small child when he became ruler, Ratna spent much of his life under the control of external forces, having been used as a puppet-monarch by domineering relations as well as being both deposed and enthroned by the powerful Mughal Empire. He was eventually killed in a coup orchestrated by his younger brother.

== Background and first reign ==
Born Ratnadeva, he was the eldest of Maharaja Rama Manikya's four surviving sons and the only one to be born of his chief queen. During his father's reign, he held the post of Yuvraj.

Rama died in 1685 and Ratna, then only 5 years old, ascended the throne under the name Ratna Manikya. The state of confusion which had ensued upon his father's death continued throughout the early years of Ratna's reign. Due to his young age, control of the state was held by his maternal uncle, Balibhima Narayana, who is described in the Champakvijay (a contemporary political work) as having been an oppressive ruler. Narayana eventually fell afoul of the Subahdar of Bengal, Shaista Khan, who, in reprisal for an invasion of the Mughal territory of Sylhet, launched an assault on Tripura in 1693. Narayana was imprisoned and the young Ratna was overthrown and replaced with his cousin, Narendra Manikya, who had aided Khan in the campaign.

== Second reign ==
Narendra reigned for about two years, during which time Ratna was kept by his side and treated affectionately. The former was eventually deposed by Shaista Khan, who had been influenced against him by another cousin, Champak Ray, among others. Ratna was subsequently restored to the throne, though once again had little actual power, having become a puppet-ruler under Ray, who was named his Yuvraj. The latter was eventually assassinated by the king's supporters.

Finally secure as ruler in his own right, Ratna enacted a number of administrative changes, such as restoring earlier ministerial positions as well as creating new ones. One of his brothers, Durjoy Singh, was named the new Yuvraj while another, Ghanashyam, was made Barathakur. (Note: Barathakur was a recently-created post which meant "principal prince".) Ratna also had dealings with other kingdoms, having battled King Paikhomba of Manipur in 1696, as well as sending another brother, Chandramani, as a hostage to the Mughal court. Between 1710 and 1715, a series of embassies and letters in Sanskrit were exchanged between the court of Tripura and that of the ruler of the Ahom kingdom, Rudra Singha, with the purpose of developing a Hindu confederation against Mughal attacks.

Due to the internal instability during his reign, Ratna had little opportunity to contribute to public works within his kingdom. Among the few he did commission was the Sateroratna Mandir, a temple dedicated to the god Jagannath in Comilla, located in what is present-day Bangladesh. Images of the goddess Kali were also installed in Comilla as well as at the temple at Kasba.

== Overthrow and death ==
Towards the end of his reign, a conspiracy was launched against Ratna by his brother Ghanashyam. The latter was assisted by Murad Beg, an influential noble at court whose married sister had been dishonoured by the king. Murad was dispatched to Dhaka, where he recruited some itinerant forces as well as a high-ranking local officer against Ratna. Ghanashyam himself was frequently absent from the capital, using the excuse that he was holding wild elephants. According to the Rajmala, Ratna was informed by his supporters that his brother was plotting against him, though he ignored the information. Historian Ramani Mohan Sarma suggests that this inaction may either have been due to the king's inexperience with diplomacy resulting in a misplaced trust in Ghanashyam, or that he was fearful of moving against his powerful brother.

In 1712, Ratna was forcibly removed from the throne and confined to the royal apartments. Ghanashyam, who took power under the name Mahendra Manikya, later had him strangled to death, with his body being cremated on the banks of the Gomti River. Ratna's wives, said to have numbered 120, all immolated themselves on his funeral pyre.

== Bibliography ==
- Acharjee, Jahar (2006). ""Tripura Buranji" A Diplomatic Mission between Assam and Tripura". Bulletin of the Assam State Museum, Gauhati. 17. Assam State Museum.
- Dey, Sitanath (2005). A Reflection to Our Cultural Heritage Through Sanskrit Studies. Sanskrit Pustak Bhandar.
- Majumdar, Ramesh Chandra (1974). History of mediaeval Bengal. G. Bharadwaj.
- Raatan, T. (2008). Encyclopaedia of North-East India. Gyan Publishing House. ISBN 978-81-7835-068-4.
- Roychoudhury, Nalini Ranjan (1983). Tripura through the ages: a short history of Tripura from the earliest times to 1947 A.D. Sterling.
- Saha, Sudhanshu Bikash (1986). Tribes of Tripura: A Historical Survey. Agartala: Rupali Book House.
- Sarma, Ramani Mohan (1987). Political History of Tripura. Calcutta: Puthipatra.
- Sharma, Suresh Kant; Sharma, Usha (2015). Discovery of North-East India: Tripura. Vol. 11. Mittal Publications. ISBN 978-81-8324-045-1.
- Thakurta, S. N. Guha (1999). Tripura. National Book Trust, India. ISBN 978-81-237-2542-0.
