= Mahendra Manikya =

King of Tripura

Maharaja of Tripura
- Reign: 1712–1714
- Predecessor: Ratna Manikya II
- Successor: Dharma Manikya II
- Born: Ghanashyam Thakur
- Died: 1714
- House: Manikya dynasty
- Father: Rama Manikya
- Religion: Hinduism

Kingdom of Tripura
- Part of History of Tripura
Kings of Tripura
Maha Manikya	c. 1400–1431
Dharma Manikya I	1431–1462
Ratna Manikya I	1462–1487
Pratap Manikya	1487
Vijaya Manikya I	1488
Mukut Manikya	1489
Dhanya Manikya	1490–1515
Dhwaja Manikya	1515–1520
Deva Manikya	1520–1530
Indra Manikya I	1530–1532
Vijaya Manikya II	1532–1563
Ananta Manikya	1563–1567
Udai Manikya I	1567–1573
Joy Manikya I	1573–1577
Amar Manikya	1577–1585
Rajdhar Manikya I	1586–1600
Ishwar Manikya	1600
Yashodhar Manikya	1600–1623
Interregnum	1623–1626
Kalyan Manikya	1626–1660
Govinda Manikya	1660–1661
Chhatra Manikya	1661–1667
Govinda Manikya	1661–1673
Rama Manikya	1673–1685
Ratna Manikya II	1685–1693
Narendra Manikya	1693–1695
Ratna Manikya II	1695–1712
Mahendra Manikya	1712–1714
Dharma Manikya II	1714–1725
Jagat Manikya	1725–1729
Dharma Manikya II	1729
Mukunda Manikya	1729–1739
Joy Manikya II	1739–1744
Indra Manikya II	1744–1746
Udai Manikya II	1744
Joy Manikya II	1746
Vijaya Manikya III	1746–1748
Lakshman Manikya	1740s/1750s
Interregnum	1750s–1760
Krishna Manikya	1760–1783
Rajdhar Manikya II	1785–1806
Rama Ganga Manikya	1806–1809
Durga Manikya	1809–1813
Rama Ganga Manikya	1813–1826
Kashi Chandra Manikya	1826–1829
Krishna Kishore Manikya	1829–1849
Ishan Chandra Manikya	1849–1862
Bir Chandra Manikya	1862–1896
Radha Kishore Manikya	1896–1909
Birendra Kishore Manikya	1909–1923
Bir Bikram Kishore Manikya	1923–1947
Kirit Bikram Kishore Manikya	1947–1949; 1949–1978 (titular)
Kirit Pradyot Manikya	1978–present (titular)

Tripura monarchy data
- Manikya dynasty (Royal family)
- Agartala (Capital of the kingdom)
- Ujjayanta Palace (Royal residence)
- Pushbanta Palace (Royal residence)
- Neermahal (Royal residence)
- Rajmala (Royal chronicle)
- Tripura Buranji (Chronicle)
- Chaturdasa Devata (Family deities)

Mahendra Manikya (d. 1714) was the Maharaja of Tripura from 1712 to 1714.

== Background ==
Originally named Ghanashyam Thakur, he was born the second son of Maharaja Rama Manikya. His elder brother was Ratna Manikya II who, after having been previously overthrown by a cousin, was restored to the throne by the Mughals in 1695. However, in return Ghanashyam was temporarily sent to the Mughal court as a hostage. At some point, he was awarded the title of Barathakur by his brother. (Note: A recently-created post which meant "principal prince".)

In 1712, Ghanashyam launched a conspiracy against his brother, having gained the assistance of Murad Beg, an influential member of the royal court. The latter was sent to Dhaka, where he recruited some itinerant forces as well as the assistance of Muhammad Sapi, a local high-ranking officer. Ratna Manikya was forcibly removed from power and Ghanashyam claimed the throne, assuming the regnal name Mahendra Manikya. He had his predecessor first confined to the palace apartments and then killed soon after, with two of the latter's prominent officers also being beheaded.

== Reign ==
Though little is known about his reign, with the Rajmala only describing him as being an "impious ruler", Mahendra appears to have enacted some reforms to the administration. His brothers Durjoy Singh and Chandramani were named Yuvraj and Barathakur respectively. He also attempted to strengthen ties with the neighbouring Ahom kingdom, located in what is present-day Assam. Assamese envoys, already present in Tripura at the time of his ascension, were formerly received at court, with Mahendra sending his own representative, Aribhima Narayana, back with them to Rangpur. Subsequently, a series of warm correspondence, embassies and gifts were dispatched between Mahendra and the Ahom king, Rudra Singha.

However, in August 1714, soon after a third embassy to Tripura was sent, Rudra Singha died, with his successor Siva Singha having little interest in continuing his father's habits. By the time these envoys had arrived in Tripura, in January 1715, Mahendra too had died, having reigned for only 14 months. He was succeeded by his Yuvraj, Durjoy Singh, who took the name Dharma Manikya II.
