= Yashodhar Manikya =

Maharaja of Tripura
- Reign: 1600–1618
- Predecessor: Ishwar Manikya
- Successor: Mughal interregnum
- Born: 1551/52
- Died: 1623 (aged 72); Mathura, Mughal Empire
- House: Manikya dynasty
- Father: Rajdhar Manikya I
- Religion: Hinduism

Kingdom of Tripura
- Part of History of Tripura
Kings of Tripura
Maha Manikya	c. 1400–1431
Dharma Manikya I	1431–1462
Ratna Manikya I	1462–1487
Pratap Manikya	1487
Vijaya Manikya I	1488
Mukut Manikya	1489
Dhanya Manikya	1490–1515
Dhwaja Manikya	1515–1520
Deva Manikya	1520–1530
Indra Manikya I	1530–1532
Vijaya Manikya II	1532–1563
Ananta Manikya	1563–1567
Udai Manikya I	1567–1573
Joy Manikya I	1573–1577
Amar Manikya	1577–1585
Rajdhar Manikya I	1586–1600
Ishwar Manikya	1600
Yashodhar Manikya	1600–1623
Interregnum	1623–1626
Kalyan Manikya	1626–1660
Govinda Manikya	1660–1661
Chhatra Manikya	1661–1667
Govinda Manikya	1661–1673
Rama Manikya	1673–1685
Ratna Manikya II	1685–1693
Narendra Manikya	1693–1695
Ratna Manikya II	1695–1712
Mahendra Manikya	1712–1714
Dharma Manikya II	1714–1725
Jagat Manikya	1725–1729
Dharma Manikya II	1729
Mukunda Manikya	1729–1739
Joy Manikya II	1739–1744
Indra Manikya II	1744–1746
Udai Manikya II	1744
Joy Manikya II	1746
Vijaya Manikya III	1746–1748
Lakshman Manikya	1740s/1750s
Interregnum	1750s–1760
Krishna Manikya	1760–1783
Rajdhar Manikya II	1785–1806
Rama Ganga Manikya	1806–1809
Durga Manikya	1809–1813
Rama Ganga Manikya	1813–1826
Kashi Chandra Manikya	1826–1829
Krishna Kishore Manikya	1829–1849
Ishan Chandra Manikya	1849–1862
Bir Chandra Manikya	1862–1896
Birendra Kishore Manikya	1909–1923
Bir Bikram Kishore Manikya	1923–1947
Kirit Bikram Kishore Manikya	1947–1949; 1949–1978 (titular)
Kirit Pradyot Manikya	1978–present (titular)

Tripura monarchy data
- Manikya dynasty (Royal family)
- Agartala (Capital of the kingdom)
- Ujjayanta Palace (Royal residence)
- Pushbanta Palace (Royal residence)
- Neermahal (Royal residence)
- Rajmala (Royal chronicle)
- Tripura Buranji (Chronicle)
- Chaturdasa Devata (Family deities)

Yashodhar Manikya (d. 1623), also known as Jashodhar Manikya, was the Maharaja of Tripura from 1600 to 1618. His reign is considered to be the nadir of the kingdom's history, with the temporary overthrowing of the monarchy and the region's incorporation into the Mughal Empire.

== Early reign ==
The son and heir of Rajdhar Manikya I, Yashodhar was not able to immediately claim the throne upon his father's death in 1600; the kingdom's nobles were hesitant in supporting his ascension due to the inauspicious horoscope at the time of his birth. He eventually took the throne after fighting off his kinsman Ishwar Manikya, who had claimed power in the meantime, as well as attempts by pretenders such as Dharma Manikya (supported by the rival Arakan Kingdom) and Virabhadra Manikya.

Like Rajdhar, Yashodhar was a devout ruler who continued the spread of Vaishnavism in the kingdom which had begun under the former's reign. As with his father, he had little interest in administration and warfare, resulting in the weakening of royal power and the decline of the army. However, there are records of some military campaigns during his reign. This included conflict with the Arakanese king Hussein Shah as well as raids against the Bhulua Kingdom, which ultimately resulted in the latter's destruction.

== Mughal conquest ==
In 1618, Ibrahim Khan Fath-i-Jang, the Mughal governor of Bengal, launched a land and sea assault on Tripura, with the intention of incorporating the kingdom into Bengal. Alongside a formidable naval fleet, two land forces were dispatched, consisting of 1000 cavalry, 60,000 infantry and 200 war-elephants. The Tripura army was quickly overwhelmed, with the capital Udaipur being captured. Yashodhar, along with his wives, fled into the jungle but were soon taken captive and escorted to Dhaka.

Though he was offered the return of his throne on the condition of providing tribute to the Mughal emperor, Yashodhar refused. He was kept in Mughal custody for the remainder of his life, first being imprisoned in Varanasi and then in Mathura. It was there that he died in 1623, while meditating, at the age of 72. Tripura remained under the control of the Mughal empire until the ascension of Yashodhar's distant kinsman Kalyan Manikya in 1626.
