= Indra Manikya II =

Maharaja of Tripura
- Reign: c. 1744–1746
- Predecessor: Joy Manikya II
- Successor: Joy Manikya II
- Born: Panch Cowrie Thakur
- Died: 1766; Murshidabad, Bengal Subah
- Consort: Durga Maharani
- House: Manikya dynasty
- Father: Mukunda Manikya
- Mother: Prabhavati
- Religion: Hinduism

Kingdom of Tripura
- Part of History of Tripura
Kings of Tripura
Maha Manikya	c. 1400–1431
Dharma Manikya I	1431–1462
Ratna Manikya I	1462–1487
Pratap Manikya	1487
Vijaya Manikya I	1488
Mukut Manikya	1489
Dhanya Manikya	1490–1515
Dhwaja Manikya	1515–1520
Deva Manikya	1520–1530
Indra Manikya I	1530–1532
Vijaya Manikya II	1532–1563
Ananta Manikya	1563–1567
Udai Manikya I	1567–1573
Joy Manikya I	1573–1577
Amar Manikya	1577–1585
Rajdhar Manikya I	1586–1600
Ishwar Manikya	1600
Yashodhar Manikya	1600–1623
Interregnum	1623–1626
Kalyan Manikya	1626–1660
Govinda Manikya	1660–1661
Chhatra Manikya	1661–1667
Govinda Manikya	1661–1673
Rama Manikya	1673–1685
Ratna Manikya II	1685–1693
Narendra Manikya	1693–1695
Ratna Manikya II	1695–1712
Mahendra Manikya	1712–1714
Dharma Manikya II	1714–1725
Jagat Manikya	1725–1729
Dharma Manikya II	1729
Mukunda Manikya	1729–1739
Joy Manikya II	1739–1744
Indra Manikya II	1744–1746
Udai Manikya II	1744
Joy Manikya II	1746
Vijaya Manikya III	1746–1748
Lakshman Manikya	1740s/1750s
Interregnum	1750s–1760
Krishna Manikya	1760–1783
Rajdhar Manikya II	1785–1806
Rama Ganga Manikya	1806–1809
Durga Manikya	1809–1813
Rama Ganga Manikya	1813–1826
Kashi Chandra Manikya	1826–1829
Krishna Kishore Manikya	1829–1849
Ishan Chandra Manikya	1849–1862
Bir Chandra Manikya	1862–1896
Radha Kishore Manikya	1896–1909
Birendra Kishore Manikya	1909–1923
Bir Bikram Kishore Manikya	1923–1947
Kirit Bikram Kishore Manikya	1947–1949; 1949–1978 (titular)
Kirit Pradyot Manikya	1978–present (titular)

Tripura monarchy data
- Manikya dynasty (Royal family)
- Agartala (Capital of the kingdom)
- Ujjayanta Palace (Royal residence)
- Pushbanta Palace (Royal residence)
- Neermahal (Royal residence)
- Rajmala (Royal chronicle)
- Tripura Buranji (Chronicle)
- Chaturdasa Devata (Family deities)

Indra Manikya II (d. 1746) was the Maharaja of Tripura during the mid-18th-century. His reign was spent struggling for control of the kingdom with his relative Joy Manikya II.

== Life ==
Originally named Panch Cowrie Thakur, he was one of the sons of Maharaja Mukunda Manikya by his wife Prabhavati. During his father's reign, he was sent to the Mughal court of Murshidabad as a hostage.

In 1739, after having been arrested by the Mughals on the grounds of neglecting to pay his tribute of elephants, Mukunda committed suicide. His cousin Joy Manikya was chosen by the populace as his successor over Mukunda's sons after the former drove the Mughals out of Udaipur. Panch Cowrie, who developed a grudge against Joy, approached Alivardi Khan, the Nawab of Bengal, for aid in claiming Tripura in 1744. With his military support, he overthrew Joy and took the throne, assuming the regnal name Indra Manikya.

However, Indra was unable to rule peacefully, as Joy ran a parallel government from the Matia Hills and had the support of influential Zamindars. The latter monarch made repeated attempts to regain full power, though was always prevented by Mughal forces. The kingdom remained divided between the partisans of the rival rulers for a time, until Indra was ousted after Joy gained the support of the Mughals. However, Indra was later once again returned to the throne by the Nawab of Dhaka after Joy failed to provide tribute.

This restoration proved short, as by 1746, Indra had again lost the favour of the Nawab and a large army was dispatched against him. He was compelled to submit and was sent to Murshidabad, where he subsequently died. Joy, who had again retaken the throne, also died around this time.
