= Dharma Manikya II =

King of Tripura

Maharaja of Tripura
- 1st reign: 1713–1725
- Predecessor: Mahendra Manikya
- Successor: Jagat Manikya
- 2nd reign: 1729
- Predecessor: Jagat Manikya
- Successor: Mukunda Manikya
- Born: Durjoy Singh or Duryodhana
- Died: 1729
- Consort: Dharmasila
- Issue: Udai Manikya II; Gadadhar Thakur
- House: Manikya dynasty
- Father: Rama Manikya
- Religion: Hinduism

Kingdom of Tripura
- Part of History of Tripura
Kings of Tripura
| Maha Manikya | c. 1400–1431 |
| Dharma Manikya I | 1431–1462 |
| Ratna Manikya I | 1462–1487 |
| Pratap Manikya | 1487 |
| Vijaya Manikya I | 1488 |
| Mukut Manikya | 1489 |
| Dhanya Manikya | 1490–1515 |
| Dhwaja Manikya | 1515–1520 |
| Deva Manikya | 1520–1530 |
| Indra Manikya I | 1530–1532 |
| Vijaya Manikya II | 1532–1563 |
| Ananta Manikya | 1563–1567 |
| Udai Manikya I | 1567–1573 |
| Joy Manikya I | 1573–1577 |
| Amar Manikya | 1577–1585 |
| Rajdhar Manikya I | 1586–1600 |
| Ishwar Manikya | 1600 |
| Yashodhar Manikya | 1600–1623 |
| Interregnum | 1623–1626 |
| Kalyan Manikya | 1626–1660 |
| Govinda Manikya | 1660–1661 |
| Chhatra Manikya | 1661–1667 |
| Govinda Manikya | 1661–1673 |
| Rama Manikya | 1673–1685 |
| Ratna Manikya II | 1685–1693 |
| Narendra Manikya | 1693–1695 |
| Ratna Manikya II | 1695–1712 |
| Mahendra Manikya | 1712–1714 |
| Dharma Manikya II | 1714–1725 |
| Jagat Manikya | 1725–1729 |
| Dharma Manikya II | 1729 |
| Mukunda Manikya | 1729–1739 |
| Joy Manikya II | 1739–1744 |
| Indra Manikya II | 1744–1746 |
| Udai Manikya II | 1744 |
| Joy Manikya II | 1746 |
| Vijaya Manikya III | 1746–1748 |
| Lakshman Manikya | 1740s/1750s |
| Interregnum | 1750s–1760 |
| Krishna Manikya | 1760–1783 |
| Rajdhar Manikya II | 1785–1806 |
| Rama Ganga Manikya | 1806–1809 |
| Durga Manikya | 1809–1813 |
| Rama Ganga Manikya | 1813–1826 |
| Kashi Chandra Manikya | 1826–1829 |
| Krishna Kishore Manikya | 1829–1849 |
| Ishan Chandra Manikya | 1849–1862 |
| Bir Chandra Manikya | 1862–1896 |
| Radha Kishore Manikya | 1896–1909 |
| Birendra Kishore Manikya | 1909–1923 |
| Bir Bikram Kishore Manikya | 1923–1947 |
| Kirit Bikram Kishore Manikya | 1947–1949; 1949–1978 (titular) |
| Kirit Pradyot Manikya | 1978–present (titular) |

Tripura monarchy data
- Manikya dynasty (Royal family)
- Agartala (Capital of the kingdom)
- Ujjayanta Palace (Royal residence)
- Pushbanta Palace (Royal residence)
- Neermahal (Royal residence)
- Rajmala (Royal chronicle)
- Tripura Buranji (Chronicle)
- Chaturdasa Devata (Family deities)

Dharma Manikya II (died 1729) was the king of Tripura Kingdom from 1713 to 1725 and again in 1729, although his power was greatly diminished in 1732 with the rise to power of Jagat Manikya with the aid of the Nawab of Bengal, Shuja-ud-Din Muhammad Khan.

== Sources ==
- Chib, Sukhdev Singh (1988), Tripura, Ess Ess Publications, ISBN 978-81-7000-039-6
- DebBarma, Chandramani (2006), Glory of Tripura civilization: history of Tripura with Kok Borok names of the kings, Parul Prakashani
- Durlabhendra; Sukheshwar; Baneshwar (1999), Sri Rajmala, translated by Kailāsa Candra Siṃha; N.C. Nath, Agartala: Tribal Research Institute, Govt. of Tripura
- Kilikdar, Bidhas Kanti (1995), Tripura of the Eighteenth Century with Samsher Gazi Against Feudalism: A Historical Study, Chhapakuthi, Agartala: Tripura State Tribal Cultural Research Institute and Museum
- Sarma, Raman Mohan (1987), Political History of Tripura, Puthipatra

== See also ==
- Manikya dynasty
- Tripura (princely state)
