= Deva Manikya =

Maharaja of Tripura
- Reign: 1520–1530
- Predecessor: Dhwaja Manikya
- Successor: Indra Manikya I
- Died: 1530
- Wives: Padmavati; Gunavati
- Issue: Indra Manikya I; Vijaya Manikya II; Amar Manikya
- House: Manikya dynasty
- Father: Dhanya Manikya
- Religion: Hinduism

Kingdom of Tripura
- Part of History of Tripura
Kings of Tripura
Maha Manikya	c. 1400–1431
Dharma Manikya I	1431–1462
Ratna Manikya I	1462–1487
Pratap Manikya	1487
Vijaya Manikya I	1488
Mukut Manikya	1489
Dhanya Manikya	1490–1515
Dhwaja Manikya	1515–1520
Deva Manikya	1520–1530
Indra Manikya I	1530–1532
Vijaya Manikya II	1532–1563
Ananta Manikya	1563–1567
Udai Manikya I	1567–1573
Joy Manikya I	1573–1577
Amar Manikya	1577–1585
Rajdhar Manikya I	1586–1600
Ishwar Manikya	1600
Yashodhar Manikya	1600–1623
Interregnum	1623–1626
Kalyan Manikya	1626–1660
Govinda Manikya	1660–1661
Chhatra Manikya	1661–1667
Govinda Manikya	1661–1673
Rama Manikya	1673–1685
Ratna Manikya II	1685–1693
Narendra Manikya	1693–1695
Ratna Manikya II	1695–1712
Mahendra Manikya	1712–1714
Dharma Manikya II	1714–1725
Jagat Manikya	1725–1729
Dharma Manikya II	1729
Mukunda Manikya	1729–1739
Joy Manikya II	1739–1744
Indra Manikya II	1744–1746
Udai Manikya II	1744
Joy Manikya II	1746
Vijaya Manikya III	1746–1748
Lakshman Manikya	1740s/1750s
Interregnum	1750s–1760
Krishna Manikya	1760–1783
Rajdhar Manikya II	1785–1806
Rama Ganga Manikya	1806–1809
Durga Manikya	1809–1813
Rama Ganga Manikya	1813–1826
Kashi Chandra Manikya	1826–1829
Krishna Kishore Manikya	1829–1849
Ishan Chandra Manikya	1849–1862
Bir Chandra Manikya	1862–1896
Radha Kishore Manikya	1896–1909
Birendra Kishore Manikya	1909–1923
Bir Bikram Kishore Manikya	1923–1947
Kirit Bikram Kishore Manikya	1947–1949; 1949–1978 (titular)
Kirit Pradyot Manikya	1978–present (titular)

Tripura monarchy data
- Manikya dynasty (Royal family)
- Agartala (Capital of the kingdom)
- Ujjayanta Palace (Royal residence)
- Pushbanta Palace (Royal residence)
- Neermahal (Royal residence)
- Rajmala (Royal chronicle)
- Tripura Buranji (Chronicle)
- Chaturdasa Devata (Family deities)

Deva Manikya (d. 1563), also spelt Deb Manikya, was the Maharaja of Tripura from 1520 to 1530. A son of the famous Dhanya Manikya, Deva initially continued his father's legacy of military conquests, though he ultimately proved to be less successful. A religiously zealous monarch, he was eventually killed in a conspiracy orchestrated by his spiritual guru.

== Reign ==
Deva Manikya, likely a younger son of Dhanya Manikya, succeeded to the throne after the death of his elder brother Dhwaja Manikya in 1520. That same year, he invaded and conquered the Bhulua Kingdom, located in what is now the Bangladeshi district of Noakhali. The city of Sonargaon was similarly captured and Deva is also believed to have held sway over Chittagong. However, his victories proved to be ephemeral since his rival, Sultan Nasrat Shah of Bengal, soon recaptured the latter region. It is also apparent that Sonargaon too was lost at some point, given that Deva's son celebrated his own conquest of the territory years later.

He was a deeply devout individual and followed the Shaktism tradition of Hinduism. After his conquests in Bhulua and Chittagong, Deva made a pilgrimage to the spring at Durasara (located in present-day Sitakunda) and performed a holy bath, striking coins to commemorate the event. One story relates that he once offered slaves as a sacrifice to the Fourteen Gods. However, when he was informed by the head priest that Mahadeva demanded an offering of the best commanders of the army, Deva had eight of his generals immolated as well.

Deva eventually became a disciple of a Tantric Maithil Brahmin named Lakshminarayana, who launched a conspiracy against him in 1530. He was eventually assassinated by Lakshminarayana, who had worked in collaboration with one of his queens. Deva's son by this queen, Indra Manikya II, was placed on the throne, though the Brahmin held the actual power in the kingdom. This continued until 1532, when Lakshminarayana was killed and the throne was taken by Deva's younger son, who became Vijaya Manikya II.
