= Comilla Jagannath Temple =

Hindu temple in Bangladesh

- কুমিল্লা জগন্নাথ মন্দির
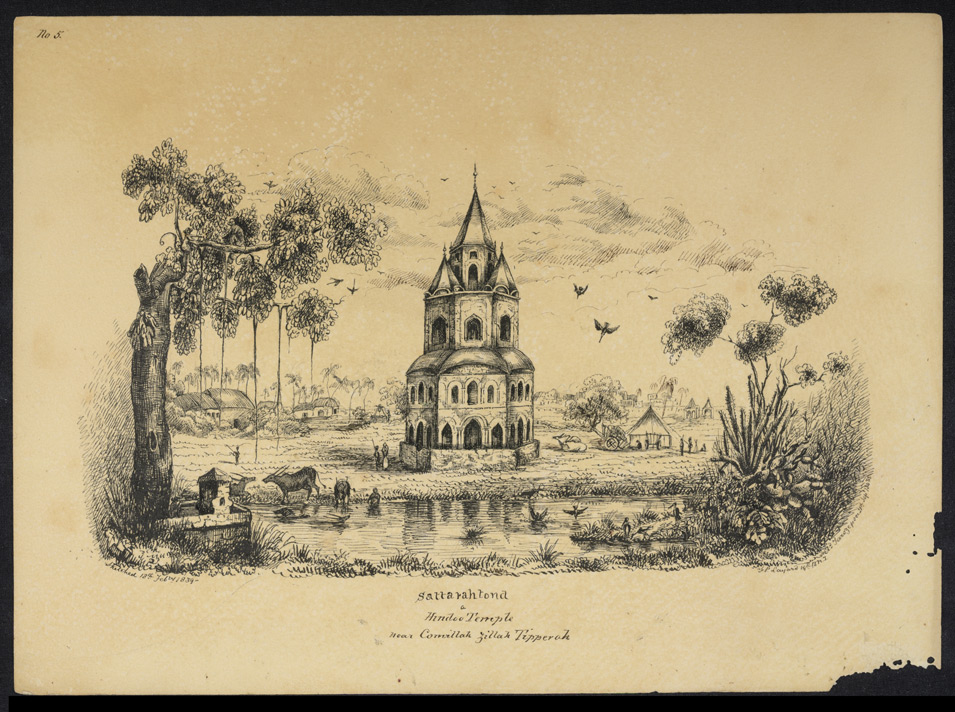
- A sketch of The Jagannath temple in 1843

- Location within Bangladesh

Religion
- Affiliation: Hinduism
- District: Comilla District
- Deity: Jagannath

Location
- Location: Jagannathpur village, Sador Upazila, Comilla District
- State: Comilla Division
- Country: Bangladesh
- Coordinates: 23°27′44″N 91°12′39″E

Architecture
- Creator: Ratna Manikya II & Krishna Kishore Manikya
- Completed: 18th century CE

Comilla Jagannath Temple, also known as Sateroratna Mandir or seventeen-jewel temple, is located in Comilla, Bangladesh. It is one of the tallest temples in the country built in 1761 A.D.

It is dedicated to the Hindu God Jagannath.

== History ==
It dates back to the early 18th century and was initiated by Ratna Manikya II, who was the king of Tripura. But was completed later in 1761 by Krishna Kishore Manikya. The deities of Jagannath, Balabhadra and Subhadra were originally installed in a temple in Tripura from where they were subsequently shifted to this temple.

According to local legend, the temple housed 17 precious jewels, which attracted a thief who climbed to the temple's pinnacle to steal them. While descending, the thief fell into an internal pit connected to a nearby pond. He managed to escape through the pit but was later found dead in the pond. It is said that the King of Tripura had a dream in which Lord Jagannath appeared, expressing that He would no longer accept offerings at the temple due to the death that occurred there and requested to be moved elsewhere.

The temple was renovated recently and all major pujas are performed here.

== Structure ==
Jagannath Temple is one of the oldest temples of Comilla district. It is located two km south-east from Comilla town. The terracotta brickwork of the temple is in the typical Bengal style of temple architecture. The seventeen jewels are the towers that originally crowned the structure but have been damaged: eight on the first floor, eight on the second, and one more in the center. The temple's spires are octagonal and umbrella-shaped, with the central spire crowned by a pitcher shaped finial. The temple has a diameter of approximately 52.50 meters and, although it appears to be three stories high from the outside, the interior allows access up to five stories. The first floor is about 4 meters high, and the temple can be entered through four arched entrances, each about 2 meters high. Each of the three tiers features arched designs, with the second floor having six arched windows. The temple is further adorned with floral, foliate, bell, and geometric patterns. It has a unique octagonal design.
