= Moirangthem =

Moirangthem is a Meitei ethnic family name (surname). People with this family name include:

- Moirangthem Kirti Singh, Indian scholar
- Moirangthem Inao, Indian playwright
- Moirangthem Maniram Singha, Indian filmmaker
- Moirangthem Nara, Indian politician
- Moirangthem Mandakini Devi, Indian footballer
- Moirangthem Gouramangi Singh, Indian footballer
- Moirangthem Govin Singh, Indian footballer
- Moirangthem Loken Meitei, Indian footballer
- Moirangthem Jayananda Singh, Indian footballer
- Moirangthem Meghachandra, Indian politician
- Moirangthem Thoiba Singh, Indian footballer
