= Keisham =

Keisham or Keisam (ꯀꯩꯁꯥꯝ) is a family name of the Meitei ethnicity, especially in India, Bangladesh and Myanmar. People use it as either forename (before middle name) or surname (after middle name).

Notable people using this family name are:

- Keisham Kuber, an Indian actor, writer and environmental activist
- Keisham Meghachandra Singh, an Indian politician
- Reagan Singh Keisham, an Indian footballer
