= Chaturdasa Devata =

Shaivite Hindu pantheon

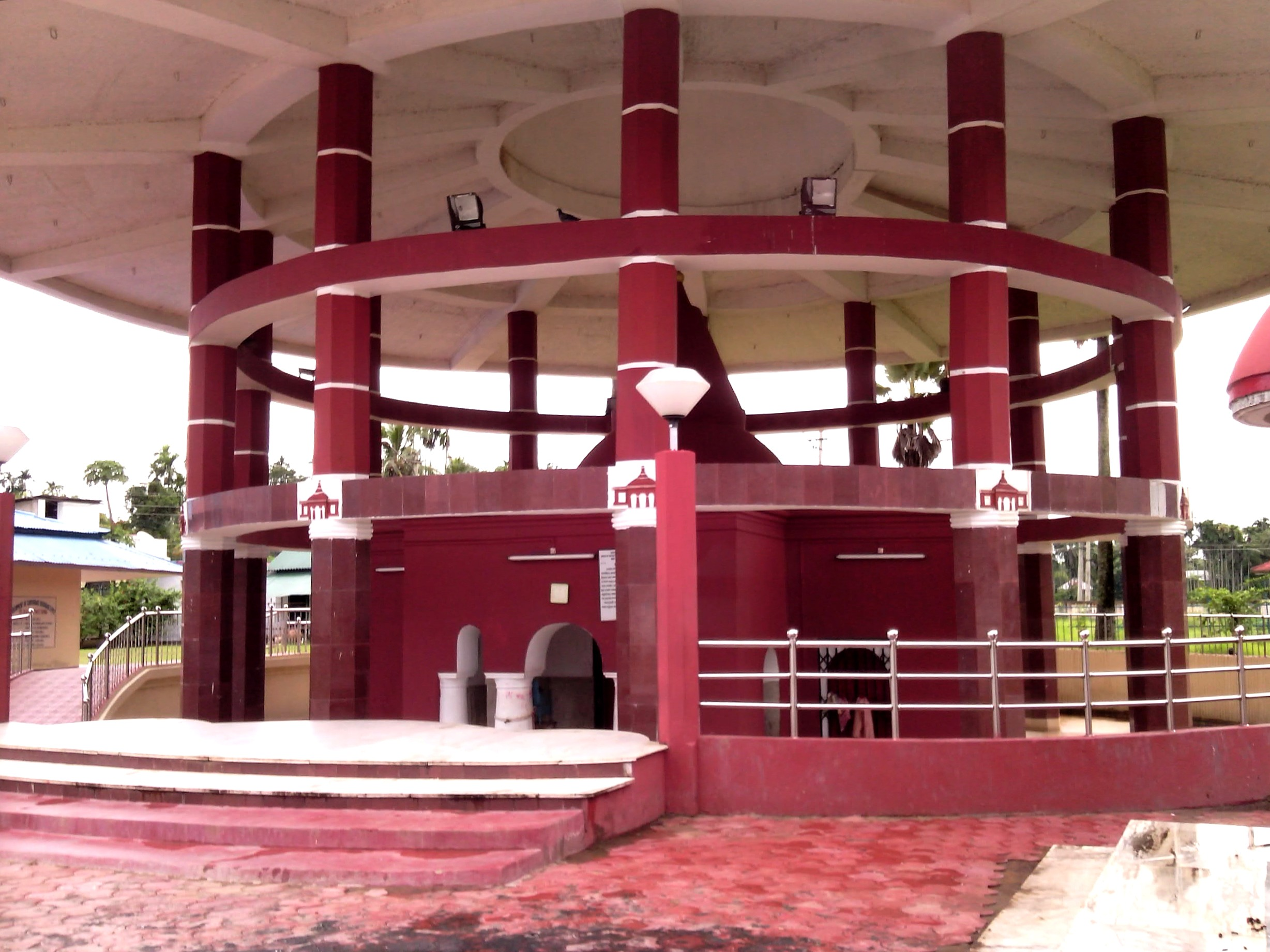
The Chaturdasa Temple in Agartala

The Chaturdasa Devata or Chibrwi Mwtai (Fourteen Gods) is the Shaivite Hindu pantheon worshipped in the Indian state of Tripura.

== Overview ==
According to traditions, the origin for the worship of these deities was contemporary to the setting of the Mahabharata, during the reign of Yudhishthira. They state that the god Shiva, after the death of Tripur (one of Tripura's legendary ancient kings), promised to grant a son and heir to his widow. However, the god stipulated that worship of the Chaturdasa Devata be duly and regularly observed in the kingdom in return. Historically, it is believed that the indigenous Tripuri people of Tripura had adjusted their native culture and religion with that of Hinduism when the latter's influence reached the region. The non-Brahman high priests, the Chantai, continued to minister their rites and rituals, but absorbed the important Hindu deities, resulting in their national pantheon transforming into the Chaturdasa Devata, with the deities being identified with a corresponding Brahmanical name.

They became the family deities of the Manikya dynasty, the former rulers of Tripura. Human sacrifices were made in their honour under monarchs such as Deva Manikya and his son Vijaya Manikya, though this practice had died out by the latter half of the 1600s. The following century, the present temple dedicated to the deities was built in Agartala by Krishna Manikya, though an earlier structure had existed in the old capital Udaipur.

Worship of the Chatursasa Devata still continues in Tripura. Their festival, the Kharchi puja, is among the most prominent in the state, taking place over the course of a week in July. The first day of the celebration is declared a holiday by the government.

== List of deities ==
Deities of the Chaturdasa Devata
	Name	Brahmanic equivalent	Role
1.	Hara	Shiva	the Destroyer
2.	Uma	Durga	Shiva's consort
3.	Hari	Vishnu	the Preserver
4.	Ma	Lakshmi	Vishnu's consort and the Goddess of prosperity
5.	Bani	Sarasvati	Goddess of knowledge
6.	Kumara	Kartikeya	God of war
7.	Ganapa	Ganesha	God of wisdom
8.	Biddhu	Chandra	the Moon
9.	Ka	Brahma	the Creator
10.	Abdhi	Samudra	God of the ocean
11.	Ganga	Ganga	the river Ganges
12.	Sekhi	Agni	God of fire
13.	Kama	Kamadeva	God of love
14.	Himadri	Himavat	the Himalayan mountains
