= Neermahal =

Water Palace in Tripura, India

- Twijilikma Nuyung
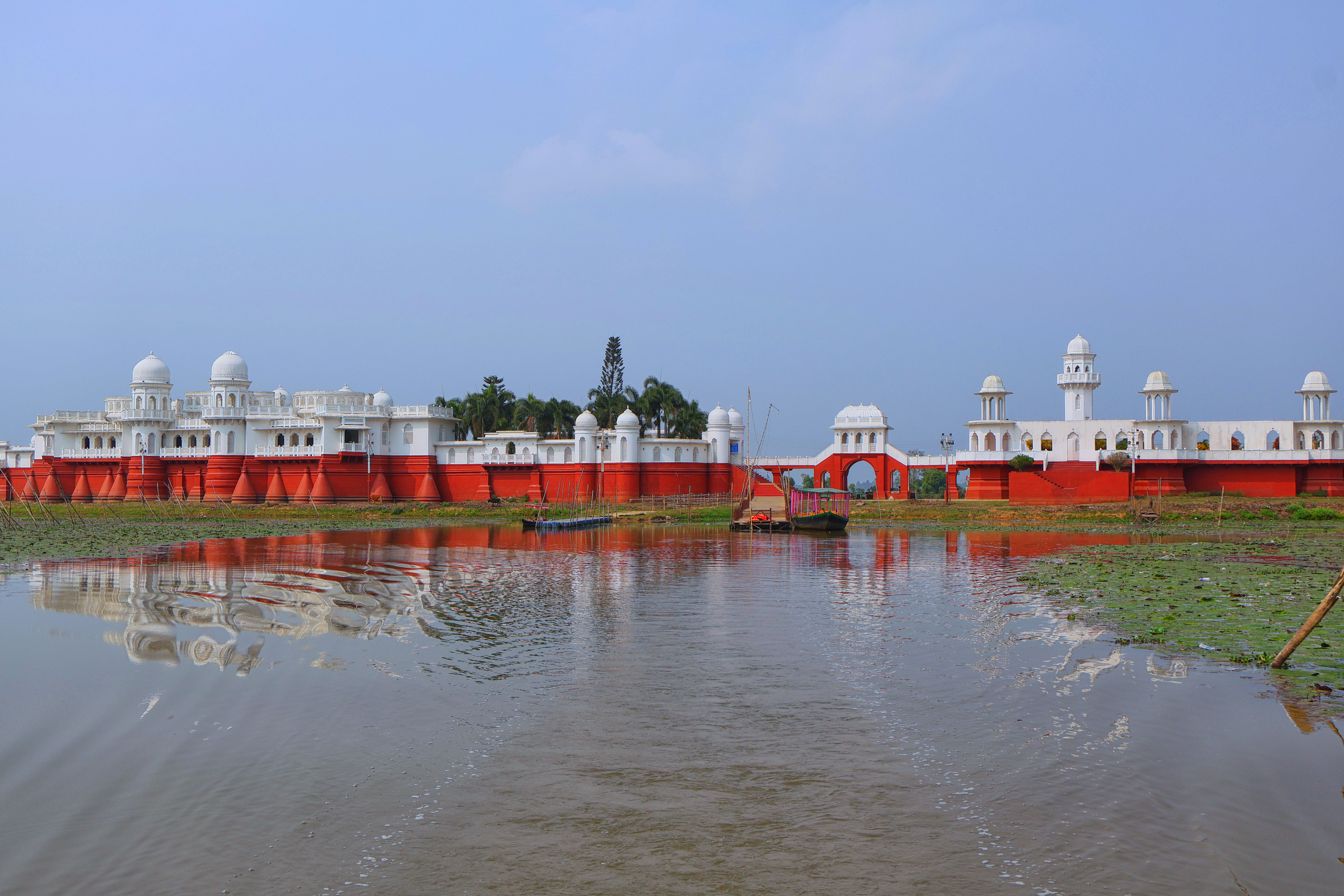
- Side view of Neermahal located in between Rudrasagar lake
- Interactive map of the Neermahal area
- Etymology: Neer (water); Mahal (palace)

General information
- Type: Palace
- Architectural style: Hindu and Mughal architectural styles
- Location: Rudrasagar Lake, Melaghar, Tripura, India, Melaghar, India
- Construction started: 1930
- Construction stopped: 1938
- Governing body: Ministry of tourism, Tripura

Design and construction
- Main contractor: Martin and Burns
- Known for: Largest Water Palace in India

Other information
- Number of rooms: 24 (approximately)

Neermahal also known as Twijilikma Nuyung (lit. 'Water Palace') is a former royal palace of the Tripura Kingdom. Built by Maharaja Bir Bikram Kishore Manikya Bahadur in 1930. It is also the largest water palace in India. The palace is situated in the middle of Rudrasagar Lake, in Melaghar 53 kilometers away from Agartala, the capital of Tripura.

== History ==
The ‘lake palace’ of Tripura, Neermahal was constructed as a summer residence of the royal family. Maharaja Bir Bikram Kishore Manikya Debbarma, of the ‘Manikya Dynasty’, which is supposed to be the second longest remaining dynasty in the world today, built this palace in 1921.

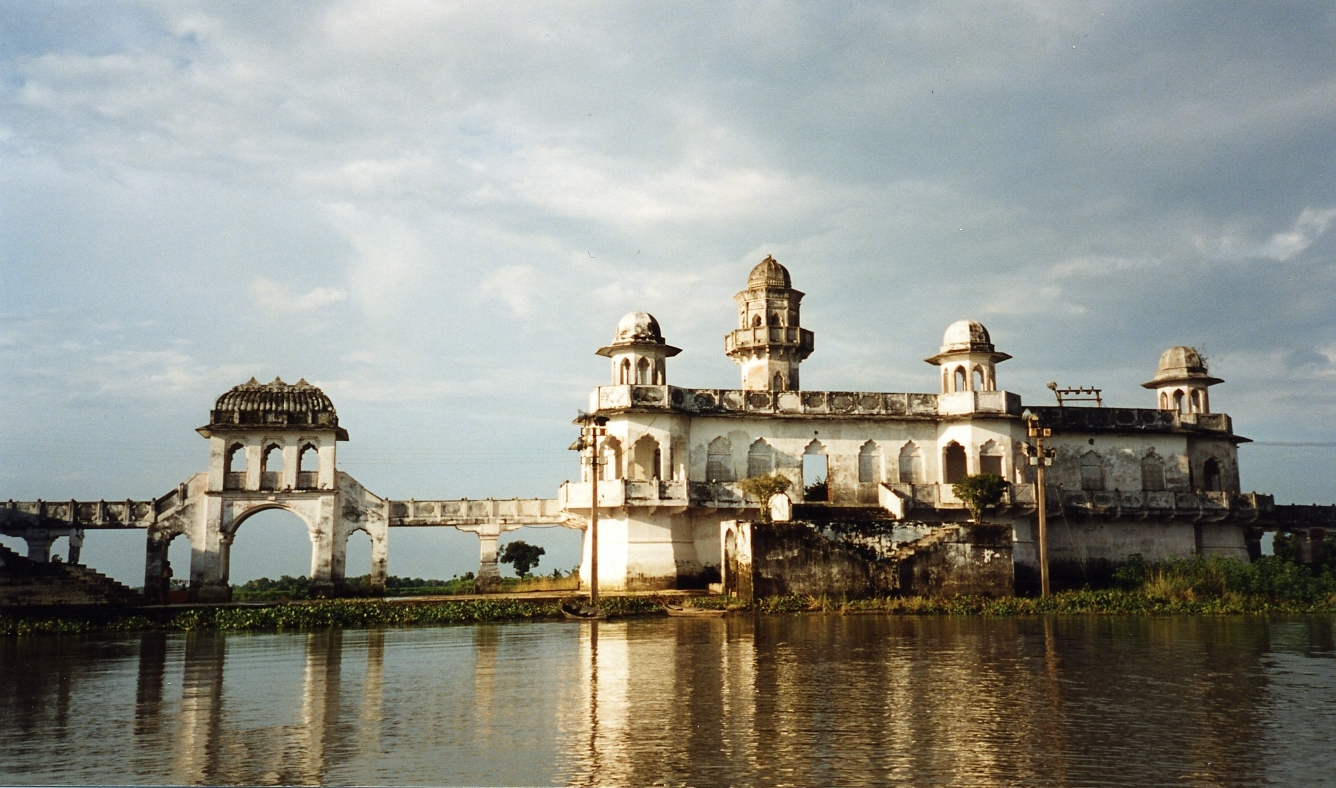
Old Image Of Neermahal before renovation

In 1921, the Maharaja commissioned the British company, Martin and Burns to build a unique water palace in the middle of Lake Rudrasagar. The lake palace was designed and built on detailed instructions from the Maharaja himself and blended Hindu and Mughal architectural styles. Marble and sandstone was used extensively and even today, the stand-out is the profusion of balconies, towers, pavilions and bridges. The dome-shaped minars that can be seen from far, also give the Neermahal a fort-like appearance. The palace is said to have taken nine years to build.

== Architecture ==
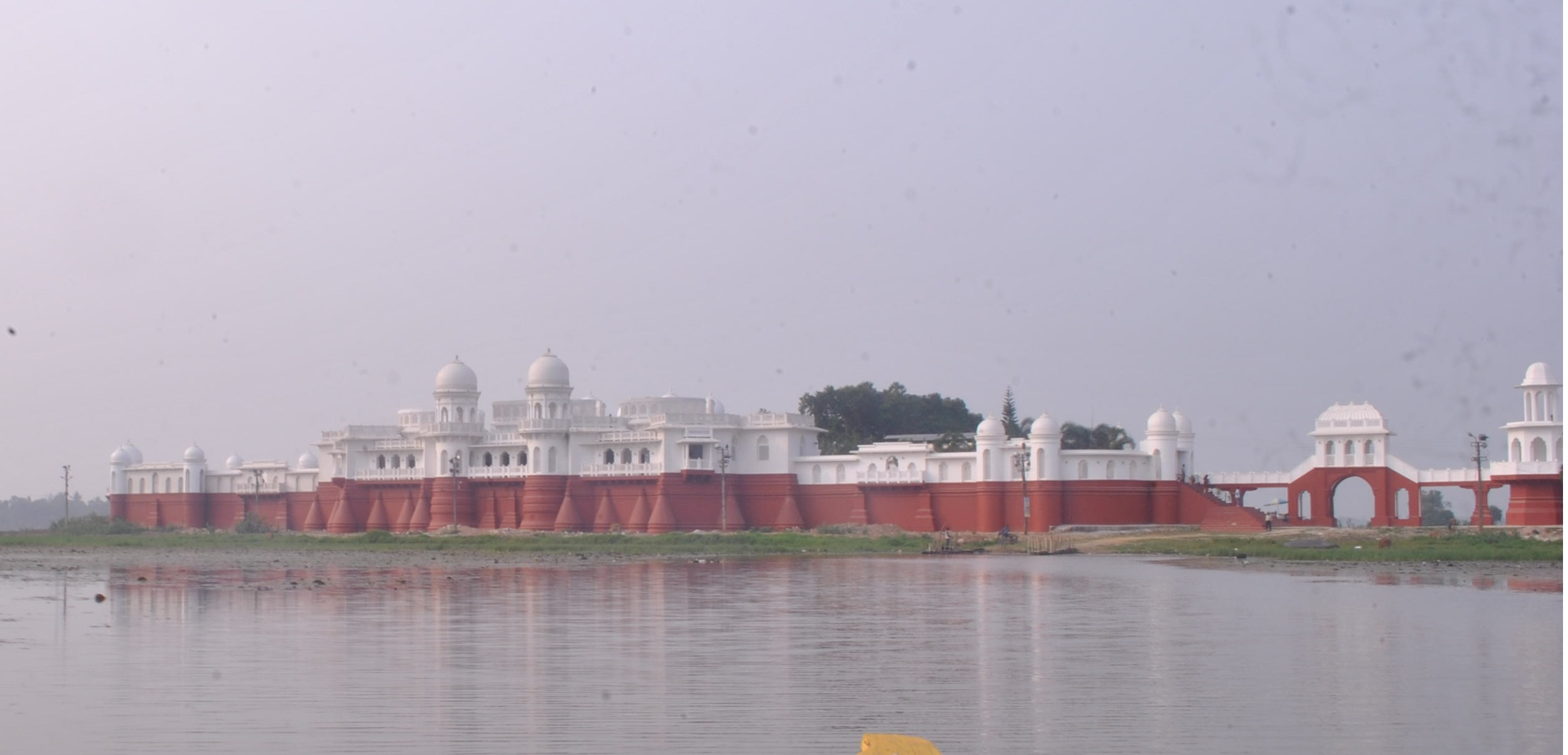
A panoramic view of the palace.

The palace is the largest of its kind in India and the only one in Eastern India. There are only two water palaces in India, the other one being the Jal Mahal in Rajasthan. However, the latter is significantly smaller in size than Neermahal.

The palace is divided into two parts. The western side of the palace is known as Andar Mahal. It was made for the royal family. The eastern side is an open-air theatre where drama, theatre, dance and other cultural events were organized for the enjoyment of Maharajas and their royal families. The palace has 24 rooms in total.

Neermahal has two stairways inside leading down to a landing on the water of Rudrasagar Lake. Maharajas used to go to the palace by hand powered boat from ‘Rajghat’. On the ceiling, the palace houses one of the most beautiful terrace gardens of India, though poor maintenance and lack of exposure to tourists has led to the depletion of beauty and splendor.

== Attraction ==
Every year in the month of August a festival is observed by the locals called Neermahal Water Festival. The festival goes on for 3 days and many colourful cultural programmes and events take place in the evenings. One of the attractions of the Neermahal Water Festival is the boat race that happens in lake. Different kinds of boats participate in the competition. Apart from that, there's a swimming competition as well that is organised during the festival.

== Photography ==
Images of Neermahal, in the middle of Rudrasagar Lake, shows the outside and inside view of the 'Water Palace'

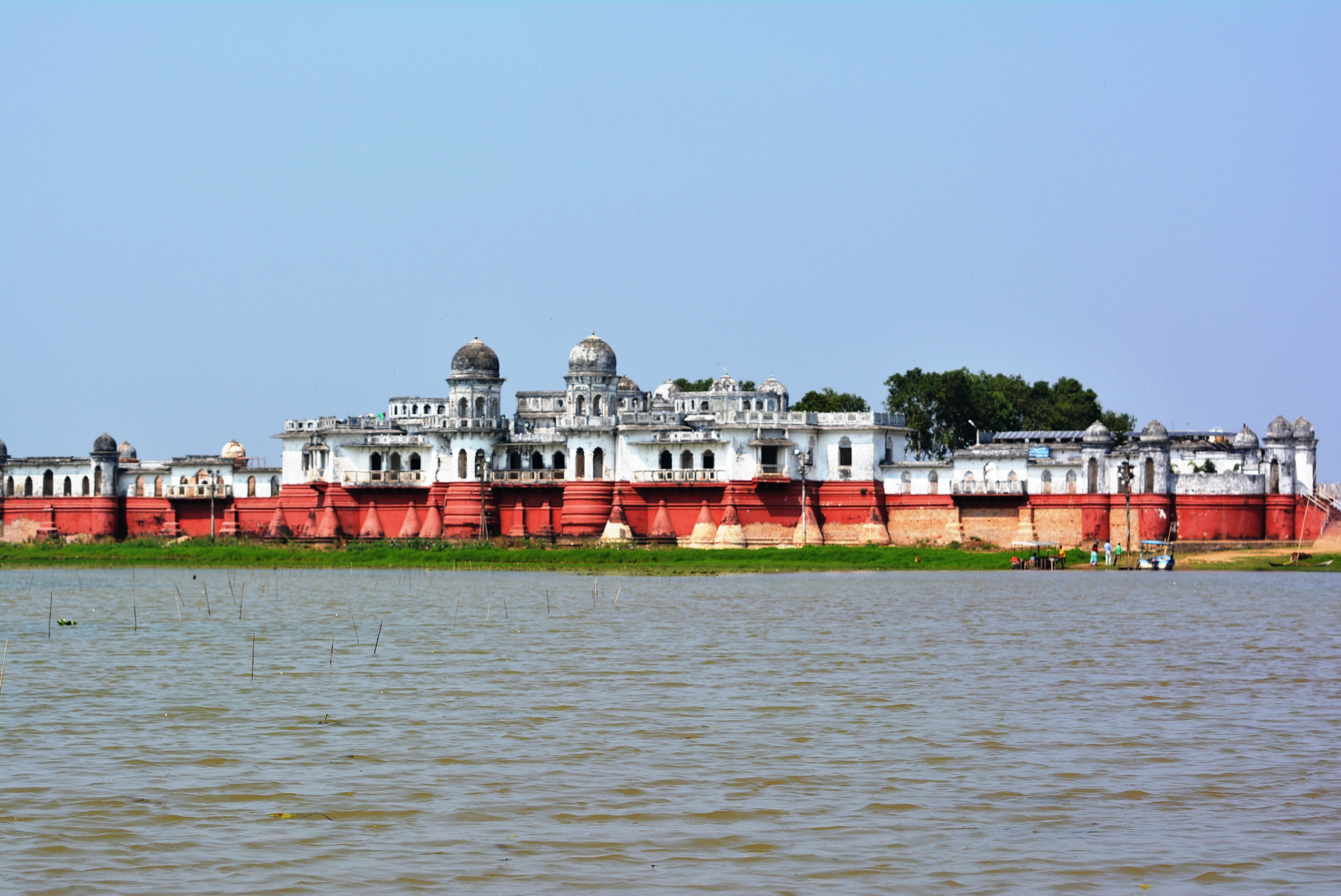
The Full View of Neermahal from Rudrasagar Lake.

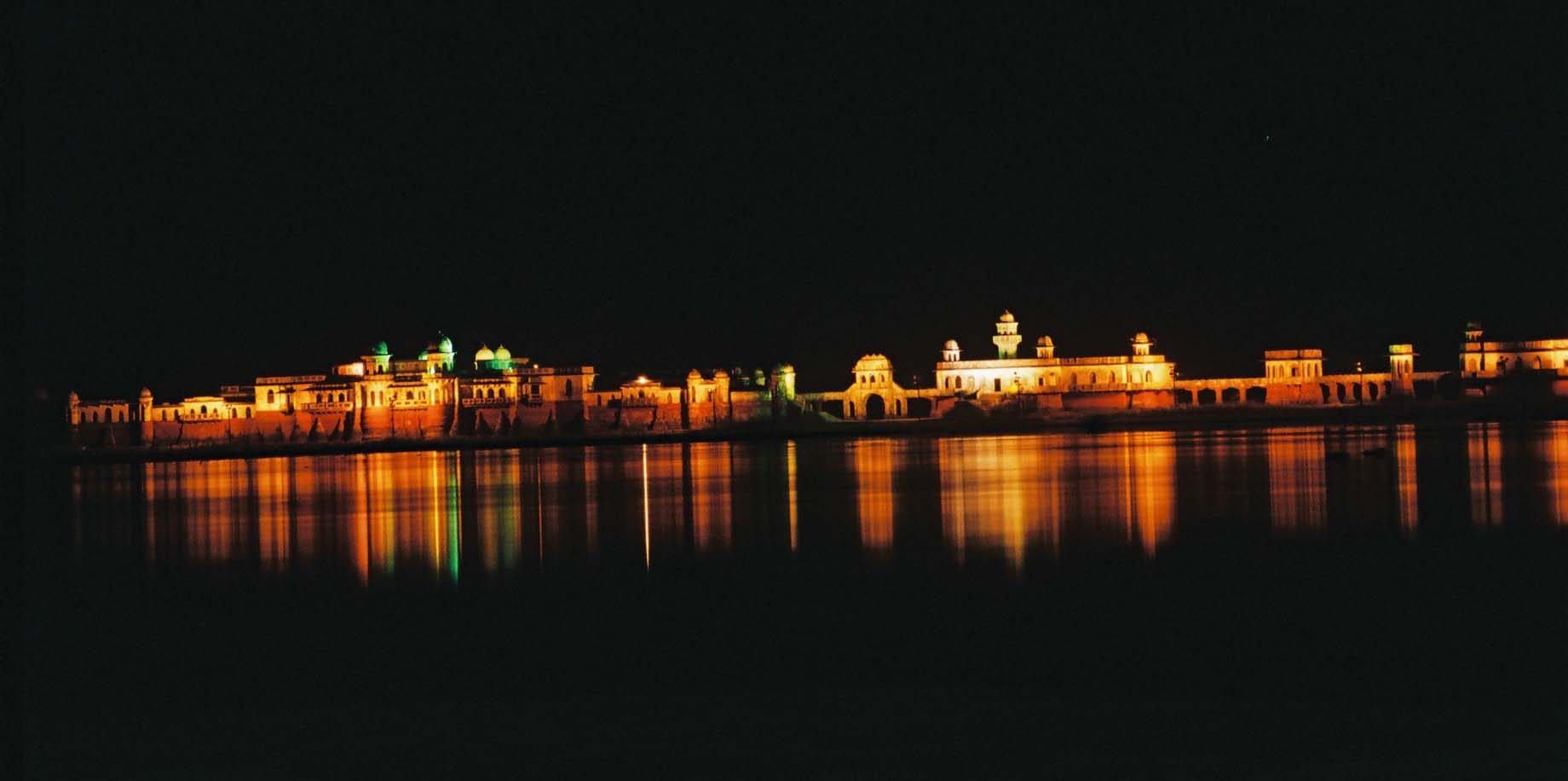
Neermahal at night, the lights of the palace are reflected in the water.

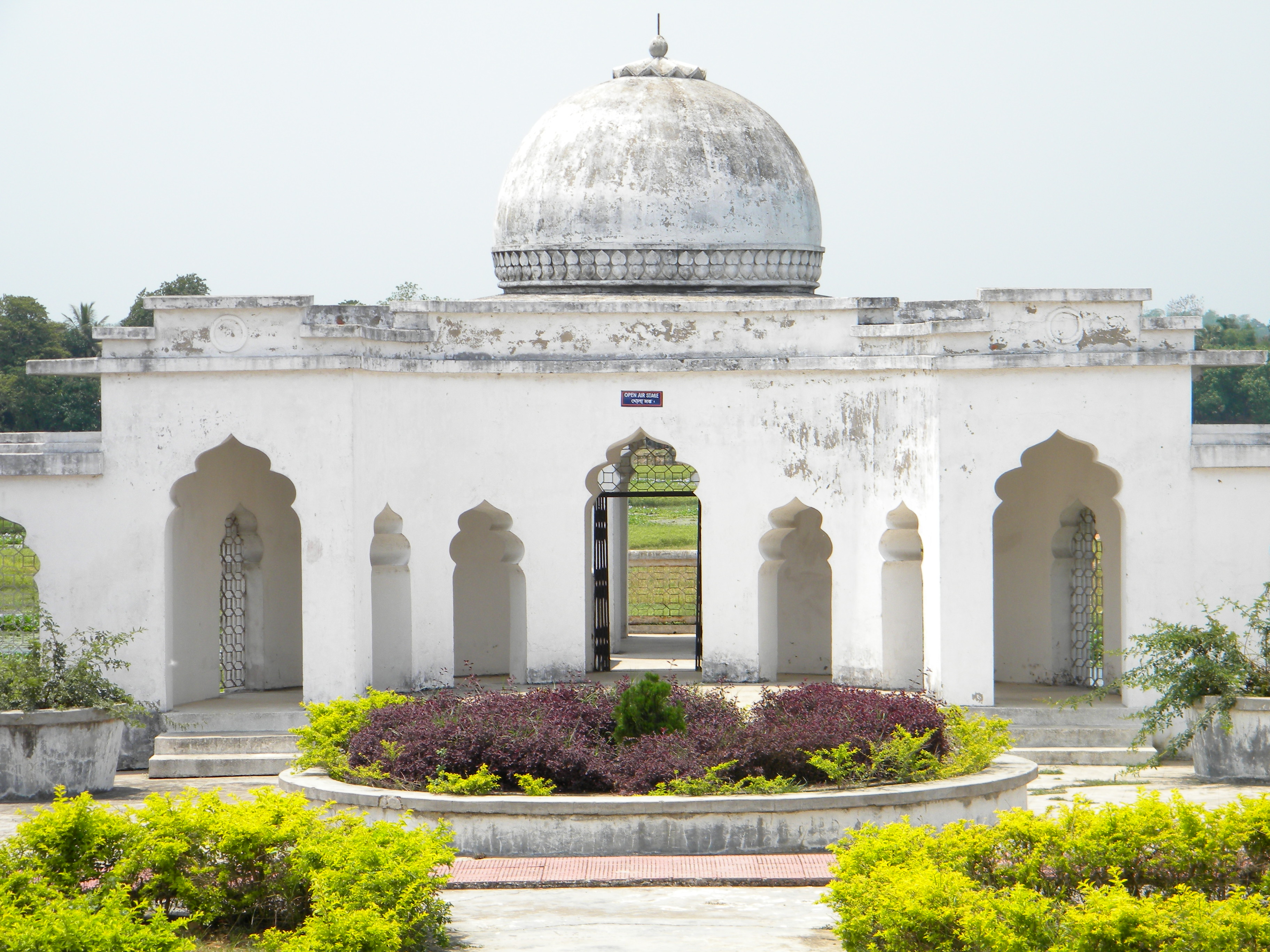
Interior of Neermahal
