= Radha Kishore Manikya =

H.R.H. Maharaja Radha Kishore Manikya Debbarman Bahadur
- Maharaja
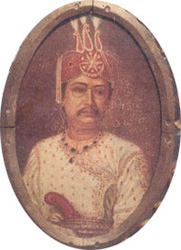
- Reign: 1897–1909
- Predecessor: Bir Chandra Manikya
- Successor: Birendra Kishore Manikya
- Dynasty: Manikya Dynasty
- Religion: Hinduism

Kingdom of Tripura
- Part of History of Tripura
Kings of Tripura
| Maha Manikya | c. 1400–1431 |
| Dharma Manikya I | 1431–1462 |
| Ratna Manikya I | 1462–1487 |
| Pratap Manikya | 1487 |
| Vijaya Manikya I | 1488 |
| Mukut Manikya | 1489 |
| Dhanya Manikya | 1490–1515 |
| Dhwaja Manikya | 1515–1520 |
| Deva Manikya | 1520–1530 |
| Indra Manikya I | 1530–1532 |
| Vijaya Manikya II | 1532–1563 |
| Ananta Manikya | 1563–1567 |
| Udai Manikya I | 1567–1573 |
| Joy Manikya I | 1573–1577 |
| Amar Manikya | 1577–1585 |
| Rajdhar Manikya I | 1586–1600 |
| Ishwar Manikya | 1600 |
| Yashodhar Manikya | 1600–1623 |
| Interregnum | 1623–1626 |
| Kalyan Manikya | 1626–1660 |
| Govinda Manikya | 1660–1661 |
| Chhatra Manikya | 1661–1667 |
| Govinda Manikya | 1661–1673 |
| Rama Manikya | 1673–1685 |
| Ratna Manikya II | 1685–1693 |
| Narendra Manikya | 1693–1695 |
| Ratna Manikya II | 1695–1712 |
| Mahendra Manikya | 1712–1714 |
| Dharma Manikya II | 1714–1725 |
| Jagat Manikya | 1725–1729 |
| Dharma Manikya II | 1729 |
| Mukunda Manikya | 1729–1739 |
| Joy Manikya II | 1739–1744 |
| Indra Manikya II | 1744–1746 |
| Udai Manikya II | 1744 |
| Joy Manikya II | 1746 |
| Vijaya Manikya III | 1746–1748 |
| Lakshman Manikya | 1740s/1750s |
| Interregnum | 1750s–1760 |
| Krishna Manikya | 1760–1783 |
| Rajdhar Manikya II | 1785–1806 |
| Rama Ganga Manikya | 1806–1809 |
| Durga Manikya | 1809–1813 |
| Rama Ganga Manikya | 1813–1826 |
| Kashi Chandra Manikya | 1826–1829 |
| Krishna Kishore Manikya | 1829–1849 |
| Ishan Chandra Manikya | 1849–1862 |
| Bir Chandra Manikya | 1862–1896 |
| Radha Kishore Manikya | 1896–1909 |
| Birendra Kishore Manikya | 1909–1923 |
| Bir Bikram Kishore Manikya | 1923–1947 |
| Kirit Bikram Kishore Manikya | 1947–1949; 1949–1978 (titular) |
| Kirit Pradyot Manikya | 1978–present (titular) |

Tripura monarchy data
- Manikya dynasty (Royal family)
- Agartala (Capital of the kingdom)
- Ujjayanta Palace (Royal residence)
- Pushbanta Palace (Royal residence)
- Neermahal (Royal residence)
- Rajmala (Royal chronicle)
- Tripura Buranji (Chronicle)
- Chaturdasa Devata (Family deities)

Maharaja Radha Kishore Manikya of the Manikya Dynasty reigned as the king of Tripura State from 1897 to 1909. He has been described as one of the architects of modern Tripura.

== Administration ==
Maharaja Radha Kishore Manikya brought about the separation of Police and Revenue Departments. Before 1905 Police and revenue duties of the state were performed by the Police officers. In 1907, the Raja thoroughly reorganized the Police Department relieving Police from revenue collection. Mr. J.C. Dutta was the first Superintendent of Police appointed by the Raja after such separation.

== Patron of the arts and learning ==
The King had a close relationship with Rabindranath Tagore. Tagore first visited Tripura in 1900 during his reign. The King supported Visva-Bharati University with an annual grant of Rupees 1000. Although in dire financial condition on account of a devastating earthquake the king pledged his daughter in law's jewellery to anonymously sponsor the scientific research of Jagadish Chandra Bose.

Ujjayanta Palace (Nuyungma) was built by Maharaja Radha Kishore Manikya during 1899–1901 at a cost of 10 lakh (1 million) rupees despite financial constraints. The earlier royal palace of the Kingdom of Tripura was located 10 km (6 mi) away from Agartala. However, as a result of a devastating earthquake in 1897, the palace was destroyed and later rebuilt as Ujjayanta Palace in the heart of Agartala city.

King Radha Kishore Manikya was a patron of learning. He set up the R.K.I. School of Kailashahar besides donating funds towards construction of Victoria college of Comilla in Bangladesh. A full-fledged medical unit in Kolkata's R. G. Kar Medical College and Hospital was set up with financial assistance provided by him.

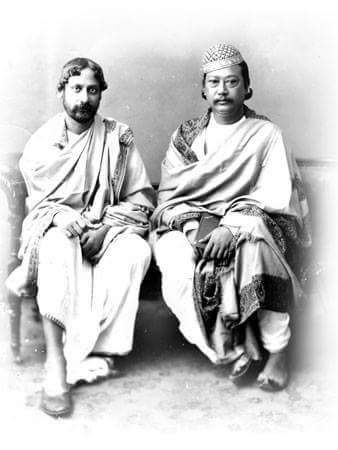
Tagore with Maharaja Radha Kishore in 1900
