= Vijaya Manikya II =

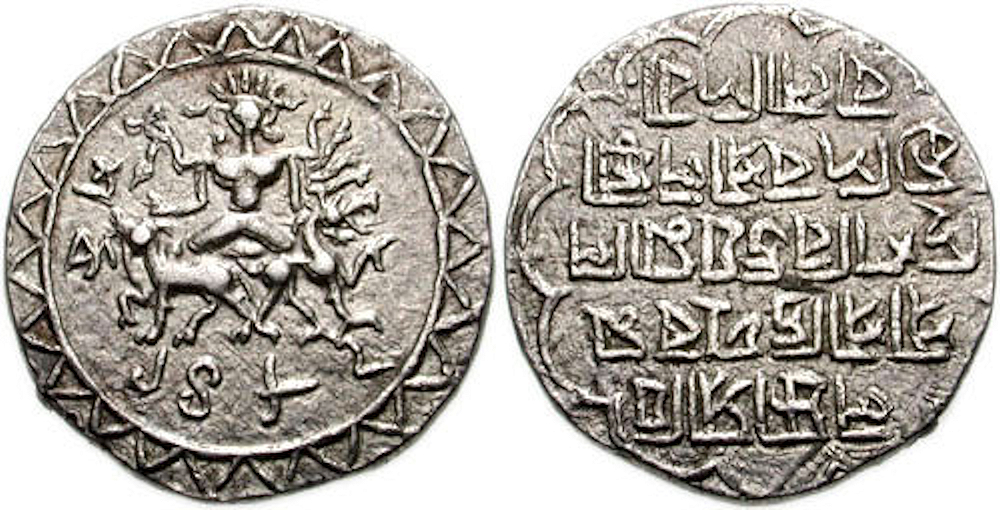
- Coinage of Vijaya Manikya II. Dated Saka Era 1482 (1560 AD). Ardhanarishvara seated facing on lion and bull; "Saka" to left; 1482 in exergue / "Lakshya Snayi/Sri Sri Tripura Na/hesh Vijaya Mani/kya Deva Sri Lakshmi/Rani Devyah" in five lines across fields.

Maharaja of Tripura
- Reign: 1532–1563
- Predecessor: Indra Manikya
- Successor: Ananta Manikya
- Born: c. 1516
- Died: 1563 (aged 47)
- Wives: Lakshmidevi; Vijaya; Sarasvati; Vamadevi
- Issue: Dungar Fa; Ananta Manikya
- House: Manikya dynasty
- Father: Deva Manikya
- Religion: Hinduism

Kingdom of Tripura
- Part of History of Tripura
Kings of Tripura
Maha Manikya	c. 1400–1431
Dharma Manikya I	1431–1462
Ratna Manikya I	1462–1487
Pratap Manikya	1487
Vijaya Manikya I	1488
Mukut Manikya	1489
Dhanya Manikya	1490–1515
Dhwaja Manikya	1515–1520
Deva Manikya	1520–1530
Indra Manikya I	1530–1532
Vijaya Manikya II	1532–1563
Ananta Manikya	1563–1567
Udai Manikya I	1567–1573
Joy Manikya I	1573–1577
Amar Manikya	1577–1585
Rajdhar Manikya I	1586–1600
Ishwar Manikya	1600
Yashodhar Manikya	1600–1623
Interregnum	1623–1626
Kalyan Manikya	1626–1660
Govinda Manikya	1660–1661
Chhatra Manikya	1661–1667
Govinda Manikya	1661–1673
Rama Manikya	1673–1685
Ratna Manikya II	1685–1693
Narendra Manikya	1693–1695
Ratna Manikya II	1695–1712
Mahendra Manikya	1712–1714
Dharma Manikya II	1714–1725
Jagat Manikya	1725–1729
Dharma Manikya II	1729
Mukunda Manikya	1729–1739
Joy Manikya II	1739–1744
Indra Manikya II	1744–1746
Udai Manikya II	1744
Joy Manikya II	1746
Vijaya Manikya III	1746–1748
Lakshman Manikya	1740s/1750s
Interregnum	1750s–1760
Krishna Manikya	1760–1783
Rajdhar Manikya II	1785–1806
Rama Ganga Manikya	1806–1809
Durga Manikya	1809–1813
Rama Ganga Manikya	1813–1826
Kashi Chandra Manikya	1826–1829
Krishna Kishore Manikya	1829–1849
Ishan Chandra Manikya	1849–1862
Bir Chandra Manikya	1862–1896
Radha Kishore Manikya	1896–1909
Birendra Kishore Manikya	1909–1923
Bir Bikram Kishore Manikya	1923–1947
Kirit Bikram Kishore Manikya	1947–1949; 1949–1978 (titular)
Kirit Pradyot Manikya	1978–present (titular)

Tripura monarchy data
- Manikya dynasty (Royal family)
- Agartala (Capital of the kingdom)
- Ujjayanta Palace (Royal residence)
- Pushbanta Palace (Royal residence)
- Neermahal (Royal residence)
- Rajmala (Royal chronicle)
- Tripura Buranji (Chronicle)
- Chaturdasa Devata (Family deities)

Vijaya Manikya II (c. 1516 – 1563), also spelt Vijay or Bijoy, was the Maharaja of Tripura from 1532 to 1563. Succeeding to the throne at a young age, Vijaya proved himself to be a formidable military leader, initiating a series of conquests into several surrounding kingdoms, including the powerful Bengal Sultanate. During Vijaya's reign, the might and influence of Tripura reached its zenith, leading to him being viewed as one of its greatest monarchs.

== Early life ==
Vijaya was born the son of Deva Manikya, himself the son of the famous Dhanya Manikya. When he was a child, Vijaya's father was assassinated in a conspiracy orchestrated by the Brahman Lakshminarayana and one of Deva's queens, who placed the latter's son, Indra Manikya I, on the throne. Vijaya himself was imprisoned, though was later freed by the commander of the army, Daityanarayana, who named him king in 1532 after having Lakshminarayana killed.

According to the Rajmala, Vijaya was initially under the protection of the commander, whose daughter he was married to. However, the young king began to chafe under the thumb of his father-in-law, who held the actual control of the kingdom and used Vijaya as a puppet-monarch. The Rajmala continues that in response, Vijaya had Daityanarayana killed. However, there is some evidence that the text had conflicted details regarding Vijaya with that of an earlier monarch, Vijaya Manikya I, who was also controlled by a military leader with the name Daityanarayana.

== Military expansion ==
Vijaya's reign is viewed to have heralded a new era in the history of medieval Tripura. The death of Daityanarayana curtailed the tremendous influence of the army chiefs in the kingdom's administration, allowing Vijaya to consolidate executive power in his own person. He was thus freed to focus his full powers in achieving his considerable military ambitions.

Great efforts were implemented in modernising the kingdom's army and strengthening its influence. Archers, elephants, artillery and a navy were organised and incorporated into its ranks, while military camps were established at Tripura's frontiers to better defend its sovereignty. In line with trends occurring throughout the Indian subcontinent, cavalries became an intrinsic part of the army during Vijaya's reign, being established with the aid of Afghan soldiers. Chronicles state that these reforms resulted in a formidable military composed of 200,000 infantry, 10,000 cavalry, 1000 elephants and 5000 boats.

This realisation of Tripura's military might allowed a period of aggressive territorial conquests to be initiated, resulting in the extensive expansion of lands under Vijaya's control. The regions of Sylhet and Jaintia were conquered and incorporated into the kingdom, the ruler of Khasiya voluntarily submitted to Tripuri suzerainty and Chittagong was recaptured from the Afghan rulers of Bengal.

However, as a result of the defeats inflicted by Vijaya on their countrymen, the Afghans in his army revolted, with 1000 Pathan horsemen marching on Chittagong. The rebels were soon captured and Vijaya had them sacrificed at the altar of the Fourteen Gods. The Sultan of Bengal, (Note: Probably Ghiyasuddin Bahadur Shah I.) who may have been disturbed by the deaths or was perhaps attempting to take advantage of the distraction provided by the rebellion, launched an invasion of Tripura. 10,000 foot soldiers and 3000 cavalry assaulted the kingdom, resulting in a protracted eight-month conflict in Chittagong. However, Tripura emerged victorious, with the Bengali commander also being sacrificed to the gods.

Vijaya launched a counter assault, with his armies raiding deep into east Bengal. He himself commanded his 5000 riverboats down the Brahmaputra River to the Padma, occupying Bikrampur and having Sonargaon plundered and burned. The Sultan, having been distracted by an internecine war with the Mughal Empire, was unable to oppose Vijaya, leaving the latter the unrivalled master of the region.

== Interactions with contemporary rulers ==
Vijaya was a contemporary of the Mughal emperor Akbar, with him finding mention in the Ain-i-Akbari. (Note: The Ain-i-Akbari refers to him with the following words: "Adjoining Bhati is an extensive tract of territory inhabited by the Tipperah Tribes. The name of the ruler is Vijay Manik. Whoever obtains the Chieftainship bears the title Manik after his name and the nobles that of Narayan. He has a force of two hundred thousand footmen and a thousand elephants. Horses are scarce.") He maintained relations with Mukunda Deva, the ruler of Odisha, to whom he entrusted the care of his elder son Dungar Fa. It is possible that an alliance had existed between these two kings in opposition to the Sultans of Bengal. He also interacted with the ruler of the Kachari Kingdom, through whose intercession Vijaya spared the king of Jaintia when the latter initially refused to submit to his authority.

In the Darrang Raj Vamsavali, a Koch royal chronicle, the Koch king Nara Narayan and his brother Chilarai are claimed to have invaded Tripura around the time of Vijaya's reign, inflicting a devastating defeat on its ruler. However, it is unlikely that this ruler can be identified with Vijaya himself, given that it is implausible that such a powerful monarch would have suffered so great a loss. Given that it finds no mention in Tripuri sources, it is instead believed that the defeat had been exaggerated or that it had occurred under Vijaya's successor.

== Death ==
In 1563, Vijaya died of smallpox at the age of forty-seven, having reigned for more than thirty years. As was custom, his wives performed Sati, following his body into the funeral pyre. At the time of his death, Tripura had reached its greatest extent, controlling the entirety of eastern Bengal as well as the southern portion of the present-day Indian state of Assam. Vijaya's successes are acknowledged in the Rajmala, which describes him in the following manner:

A king like Dhanya Manikya is rare in the world. His son Deva-Manikya was a jewel. King Vijay Manikya is his son. The crest-jewels of other kings rub his feet. He possesses immense power and shines among the circle of kings.

He was succeeded by his son Ananta Manikya, who proved to be less able than his father. Tripura subsequently experienced a period of gradual decay.

== Bibliography ==
- Bhattacharjee, Jayanta Bhusan (1991). Social and polity formations in pre-colonial north-east India: the Barak Valley experience. Har-Anand Publications in association with Vikas Pub. House. ISBN 9780706954647.
- Chatterji, Suniti Kumar (1951). Kirata Jana Krti. – The Indo-Mongoloids: Their Contribution to the History and Culture of India. The Asiatic Society.
- Chib, Sukhdev Singh (1988). Tripura. Ess Ess Publications. ISBN 978-81-7000-039-6.
- Choudhury, Rabin Dev (1986). A Source Book of the Numismatic Studies in North East India. Vol. I. Directorate of Museums, Assam.
- Das, Ratna (1997). Art and Architecture of Tripura. Tribal Research Institute, Government of Tripura.
- Durlabhendra; Sukheshwar; Baneshwar (1999). Sri Rajmala. Translated by Kailāsa Candra Siṃha; N.C. Nath. Agartala: Tribal Research Institute, Govt. of Tripura.
- Gan-Chaudhuri, Jagadis (1980). Tripura, the land and its people. Leeladevi Publications. ISBN 9788121004480.
- Goswami, Debabrata (1996). Military History of Tripura, 1490 to 1947. Agartala: Tripura State Tribal Cultural Research Institute & Museum, Government of Tripura.
- Guha Thakurta, S. N. (1999). India- the land and the people: Tripura. National Book Trust, India. ISBN 978-81-237-2542-0.
- Liberman, Kenneth (1992). "Philosophical Debate in the Tibetan Academy". The Tibet Journal. XVII. Library of Tibetan Works & Archives.
- Nath, D. (1989). History of the Koch Kingdom, C. 1515-1615. Delhi: Mittal Publications. ISBN 978-81-7099-109-0.
- Raatan, T. (2008). Encyclopaedia of North-East India. Gyan Publishing House. ISBN 978-81-7835-068-4.
- Roychoudhury, Nalini Ranjan (1983). Tripura through the ages: a short history of Tripura from the earliest times to 1947 A.D. Sterling.
- Sarma, Ramani Mohan (1987). Political History of Tripura. Puthipatra.
- Sircar, Dineshchandra (1975). The Tripura Tradition Tested by Coins and Inscriptions. The Journal of the Numismatic Society of India. Vol. 37. Numismatic Society of India, P.O. Hindu University.
- Sircar, Dineshchandra (1979). Some Epigraphical Records of the Medieval Period from Eastern India. New Delhi: Abhinav Publications. ISBN 978-81-7017-096-9.
