= Dhanya Manikya =

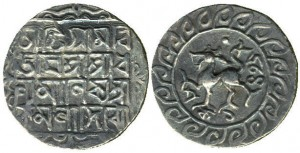
- A silver tanka of Dhanya Manikya (1514)

Maharaja of Tripura
- Reign: 1490-1515
- Predecessor: Mukut Manikya
- Successor: Dhwaja Manikya
- Consort: Kamala Devi
- Issue: Dhwaja Manikya; Deva Manikya
- House: Manikya dynasty
- Father: Ratna Manikya I
- Religion: Hinduism

Kingdom of Tripura
- Part of History of Tripura
Kings of Tripura
| Maha Manikya | c. 1400–1431 |
| Dharma Manikya I | 1431–1462 |
| Ratna Manikya I | 1462–1487 |
| Pratap Manikya | 1487 |
| Vijaya Manikya I | 1488 |
| Mukut Manikya | 1489 |
| Dhanya Manikya | 1490–1515 |
| Dhwaja Manikya | 1515–1520 |
| Deva Manikya | 1520–1530 |
| Indra Manikya I | 1530–1532 |
| Vijaya Manikya II | 1532–1563 |
| Ananta Manikya | 1563–1567 |
| Udai Manikya I | 1567–1573 |
| Joy Manikya I | 1573–1577 |
| Amar Manikya | 1577–1585 |
| Rajdhar Manikya I | 1586–1600 |
| Ishwar Manikya | 1600 |
| Yashodhar Manikya | 1600–1623 |
| Interregnum | 1623–1626 |
| Kalyan Manikya | 1626–1660 |
| Govinda Manikya | 1660–1661 |
| Chhatra Manikya | 1661–1667 |
| Govinda Manikya | 1661–1673 |
| Rama Manikya | 1673–1685 |
| Ratna Manikya II | 1685–1693 |
| Narendra Manikya | 1693–1695 |
| Ratna Manikya II | 1695–1712 |
| Mahendra Manikya | 1712–1714 |
| Dharma Manikya II | 1714–1725 |
| Jagat Manikya | 1725–1729 |
| Dharma Manikya II | 1729 |
| Mukunda Manikya | 1729–1739 |
| Joy Manikya II | 1739–1744 |
| Indra Manikya II | 1744–1746 |
| Udai Manikya II | 1744 |
| Joy Manikya II | 1746 |
| Vijaya Manikya III | 1746–1748 |
| Lakshman Manikya | 1740s/1750s |
| Interregnum | 1750s–1760 |
| Krishna Manikya | 1760–1783 |
| Rajdhar Manikya II | 1785–1806 |
| Rama Ganga Manikya | 1806–1809 |
| Durga Manikya | 1809–1813 |
| Rama Ganga Manikya | 1813–1826 |
| Kashi Chandra Manikya | 1826–1829 |
| Krishna Kishore Manikya | 1829–1849 |
| Ishan Chandra Manikya | 1849–1862 |
| Bir Chandra Manikya | 1862–1896 |
| Radha Kishore Manikya | 1896–1909 |
| Birendra Kishore Manikya | 1909–1923 |
| Bir Bikram Kishore Manikya | 1923–1947 |
| Kirit Bikram Kishore Manikya | 1947–1949; 1949–1978 (titular) |
| Kirit Pradyot Manikya | 1978–present (titular) |

Tripura monarchy data
- Manikya dynasty (Royal family)
- Agartala (Capital of the kingdom)
- Ujjayanta Palace (Royal residence)
- Pushbanta Palace (Royal residence)
- Neermahal (Royal residence)
- Rajmala (Royal chronicle)
- Tripura Buranji (Chronicle)
- Chaturdasa Devata (Family deities)

Dhanya Manikya was the Maharaja of Tripura who reigned from 1490 to 1515 C.E. In this time, Tripura Sundari Temple was established.

== Biography ==
Assisted by his generals Rai Kwchak and Rai Kosom, Dhanya Manikya expanded Tripura's territorial domain well into Eastern Bengal, establishing control over the entire district of Comilla and parts of Sylhet, Noakhali and Chittagong districts of Bangladesh.

Dhanya Manikya set up many temples, the foremost of which is the Tripura Sundari Temple in Udaipur. Before his death from smallpox in the year 1515 Dhanya had consolidated the kingdom through military prowess.

== See also ==
- Manikya dynasty
- Tripura (princely state)
