= Ujjayanta Palace =

State museum and former royal palace in Tripura, India

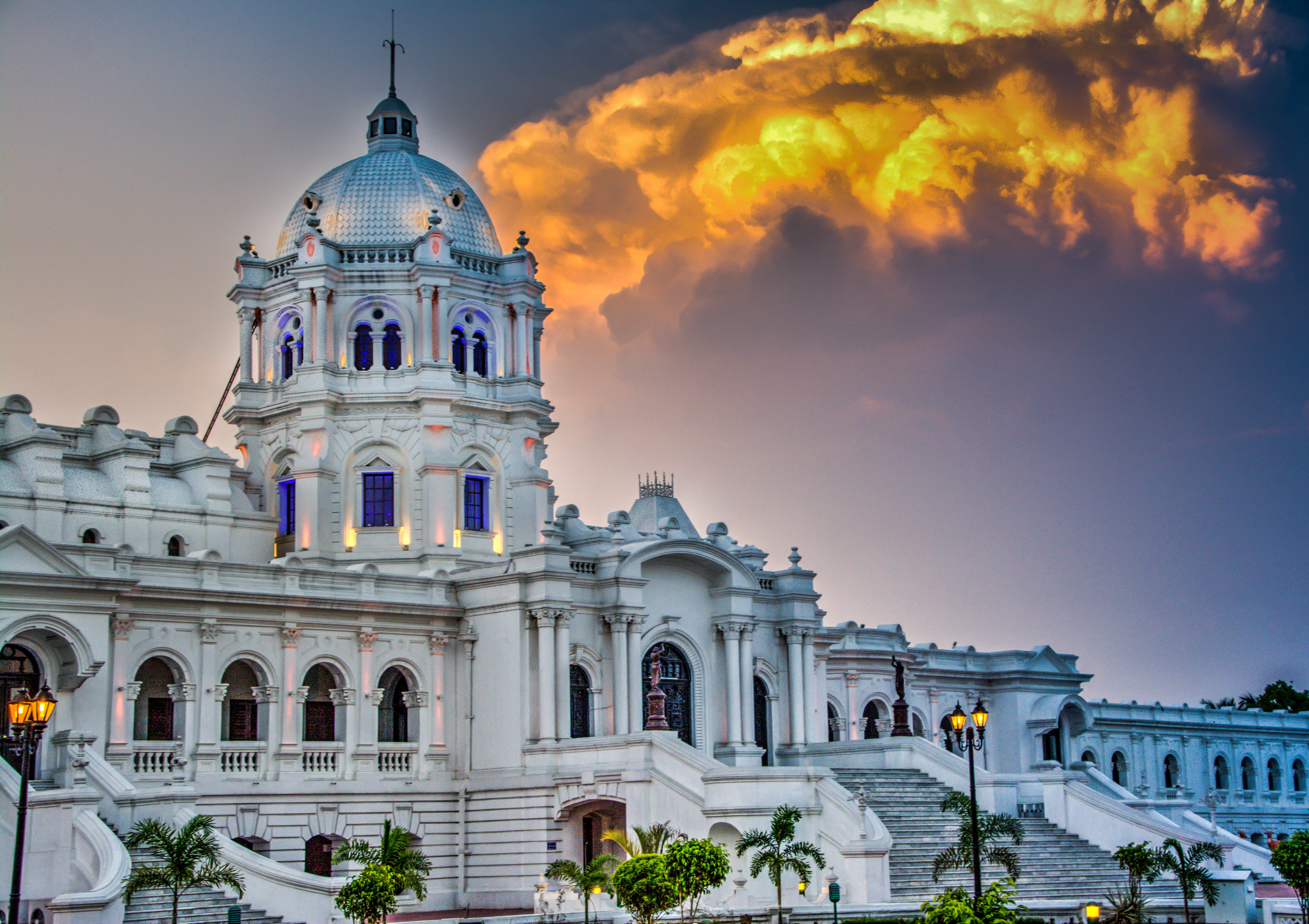
- South facade of Ujjayanta Palace, 2014
- Established: 1901; 125 years ago
- Location: Agartala, Tripura, India
- Coordinates: 23.8374°N 91.2827°E
- Type: Cultural and historical museum
- Founder: Maharaja Radha Kishore Manikya
- Architect: Sir Alexander Martin (Martin and Burn Co.)
- Public transit access: Agartala Railway Station

Kingdom of Tripura
- Part of History of Tripura
Kings of Tripura
Maha Manikya	c. 1400–1431
Dharma Manikya I	1431–1462
Ratna Manikya I	1462–1487
Pratap Manikya	1487
Vijaya Manikya I	1488
Mukut Manikya	1489
Dhanya Manikya	1490–1515
Dhwaja Manikya	1515–1520
Deva Manikya	1520–1530
Indra Manikya I	1530–1532
Vijaya Manikya II	1532–1563
Ananta Manikya	1563–1567
Udai Manikya I	1567–1573
Joy Manikya I	1573–1577
Amar Manikya	1577–1585
Rajdhar Manikya I	1586–1600
Ishwar Manikya	1600
Yashodhar Manikya	1600–1623
Interregnum	1623–1626
Kalyan Manikya	1626–1660
Govinda Manikya	1660–1661
Chhatra Manikya	1661–1667
Govinda Manikya	1661–1673
Rama Manikya	1673–1685
Ratna Manikya II	1685–1693
Narendra Manikya	1693–1695
Ratna Manikya II	1695–1712
Mahendra Manikya	1712–1714
Dharma Manikya II	1714–1725
Jagat Manikya	1725–1729
Dharma Manikya II	1729
Mukunda Manikya	1729–1739
Joy Manikya II	1739–1744
Indra Manikya II	1744–1746
Udai Manikya II	1744
Joy Manikya II	1746
Vijaya Manikya III	1746–1748
Lakshman Manikya	1740s/1750s
Interregnum	1750s–1760
Krishna Manikya	1760–1783
Rajdhar Manikya II	1785–1806
Rama Ganga Manikya	1806–1809
Durga Manikya	1809–1813
Rama Ganga Manikya	1813–1826
Kashi Chandra Manikya	1826–1829
Krishna Kishore Manikya	1829–1849
Ishan Chandra Manikya	1849–1862
Bir Chandra Manikya	1862–1896
Radha Kishore Manikya	1896–1909
Birendra Kishore Manikya	1909–1923
Bir Bikram Kishore Manikya	1923–1947
Kirit Bikram Kishore Manikya	1947–1949; 1949–1978 (titular)
Kirit Pradyot Manikya	1978–present (titular)

Tripura monarchy data
- Manikya dynasty (Royal family)
- Agartala (Capital of the kingdom)
- Ujjayanta Palace (Royal residence)
- Pushbanta Palace (Royal residence)
- Neermahal (Royal residence)
- Rajmala (Royal chronicle)
- Tripura Buranji (Chronicle)
- Chaturdasa Devata (Family deities)

Ujjayanta Palace is the state museum of the Indian state of Tripura and former royal palace of the princely state of Tripura. It was built by Maharaja Radha Kishore Manikya in 1901. It housed the State Legislative Assembly between 1973 and 2011. The palace primarily showcases the lifestyle, arts, culture, tradition and crafts of communities residing in northeast India, along with many stone sculptures of the Manikya dynasty.

== History ==
=== As royal palace ===
The original Ujjayanta Palace was built in 1862, 10 km (6 mi) away from Agartala, by King Ishan Chandra Manikya (1849–1862). It was devastated by the 1897 Assam earthquake. The current palace was built in the heart of Agartala city by Maharaja Radha Kishore Manikya between 1899 and 1901, at a then exorbitant cost of 10 lakh (1 million) rupees. It was built by Martin and Burn Co. The name "Ujjayanta" was given by poet Rabindranath Tagore. It was the principal residence of the Manikyas until Tripura's merger with the Dominion of India in October 1949.

=== As state assembly building ===
The palace was purchased from the royal family by the Government of Tripura in 1972–73 for Rs. 2.5 million. It housed the Tripura Legislative Assembly until July 2011 when the assembly moved to a new location 6 km (3.7 mi) north of Agartala.

=== As state museum ===
The palace was given seismic retrofitting to prevent possible earthquake damage, and was inaugurated as the state museum by Vice-President Mohammad Hamid Ansari on 25 September 2013.

The government of Tripura had initially planned to rename the palace as the "Tripura State Museum". The Indigenous Nationalist Party of Twipra (INPT) protested to Vice-President Ansari. Pradyot Bikram Manikya Deb Barma, pretender to the throne of Tripura, also spoke out against the planned renaming. In response, the Tripura government decided to keep the original name and to build a statue of Maharaja Radha Kishore Manikya on the museum premises. The palace received further restorations in 2023.

== Architecture ==
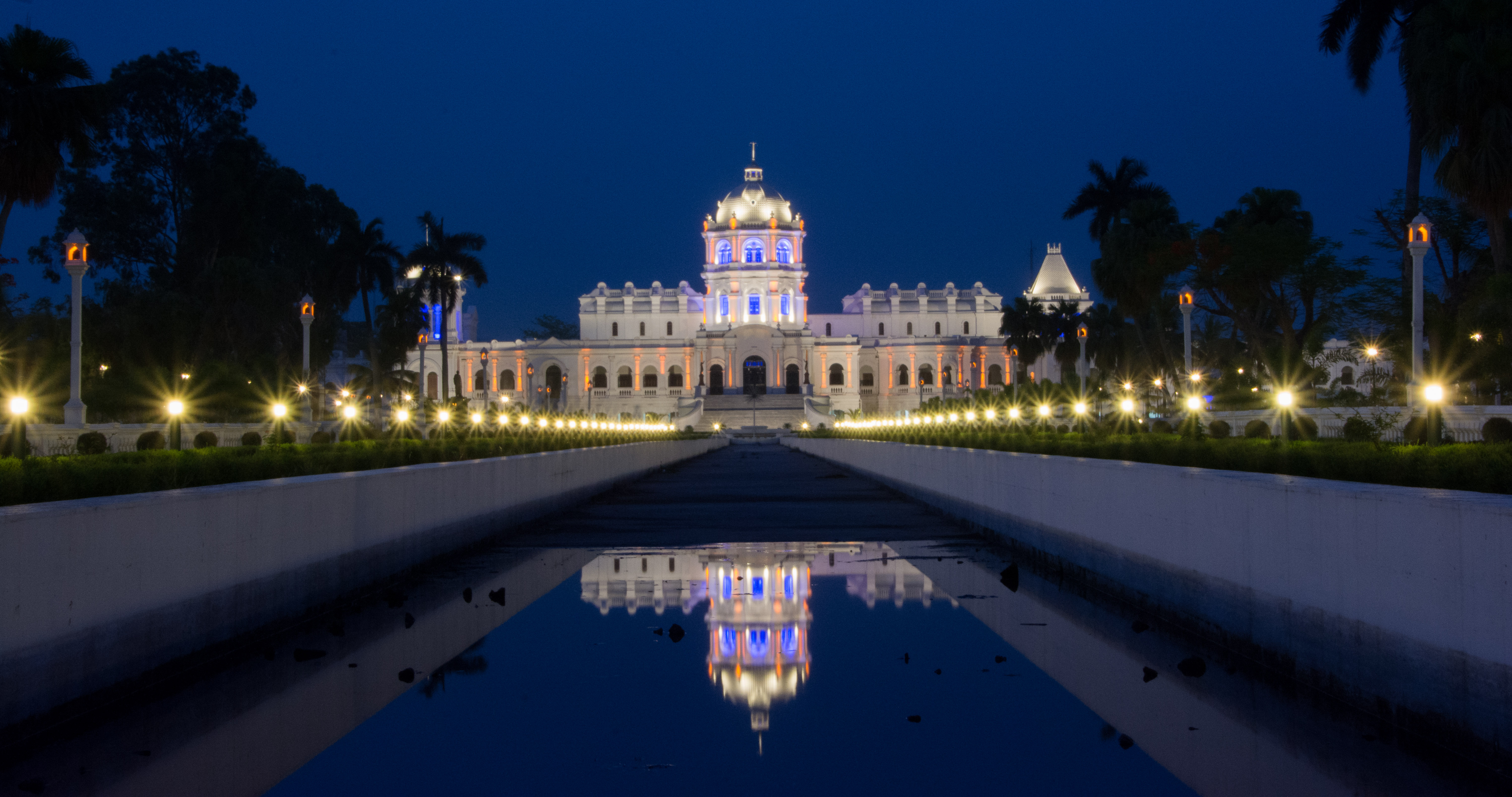
Ujjayanta Palace at night, 2014

The palace was designed by Sir Alexander Martin of the Martin and Burn Company in the Indo-saracenic style, showing a mix of Mughal, Roman and British influences. The two-storied palace has three large domes, the largest of which is 86 ft (26 m) high, and which rests atop a four-storied central tower. The Ujjayanta Palace compound covers an area of approximately 1 km^{2} (250 acres) and includes public rooms such as the throne room, durbar hall, library and reception hall.

There are two large artificial ponds on either side of the garden which is decorated with pools and fountains. The grounds cover 800 acres (3.2 km^{2}) in the heart of Agartala.

Several Hindu temples occupy plots adjacent to Ujjayanta Palace, dedicated to Lakshmi Narayan, Uma-Maheshwari, Kali and Jagannath.

== Collection ==
Ujjayanta Palace is a multicultural museum with emphasis on art and crafts of the state of Tripura. The museum was established on 22 June 1970 and shifted to the current premises on 25 September 2013. It is North-east India's largest museum with a "national perspective while remaining focused on Tripura and northeast India".

The museum has twenty-two display galleries. The exhibits in the museum are of sculpture, terracotta, bronze images, coins of the Tripuri kingdom, paintings and other historical items excavated from historical sites of Tripura, archaeological antiquities, historical Indian sculptures, paintings and tribal culture. The museum has 1406 collections on display which include 79 stone sculptures, 141 terracotta plaques, 774 coins of gold, silver and copper, 10 copper plate inscriptions, 9 stone inscriptions, 39 images of bronze, 102 textile items, 58 oil paintings, 63 sketches and drawings, and 197 ornaments. The sculpture collections are mostly from Udaipur, Pilak, Jolaibari, and other locations in Tripura.

The most distinctive exhibits are from Pilak, which consist of sculptures of different cultures of Hinduism and Buddhism from the period of 9th to 13th centuries. The well crafted and moulded bronze sculptures are of Mukhalinga, Avalokitesvara, Tara, and Vishnu. The terracotta exhibits are from the Pilak and Amarpur sites, and also from Bengal school of art.

== See also ==
- Tripura State Tribal Museum
