= Vijaya Manikya I =

Maharaja of Tripura from 1487 to 1488

Maharaja of Tripura
- Reign: 1488
- Predecessor: Pratap Manikya
- Successor: Mukut Manikya
- Consort: Daughter of Daityanarayan
- House: Manikya dynasty
- Father: Pratap Manikya (possibly)
- Mother: Sister of Daityanarayan

Kingdom of Tripura
- Part of History of Tripura
Kings of Tripura
Maha Manikya	c. 1400–1431
Dharma Manikya I	1431–1462
Ratna Manikya I	1462–1487
Pratap Manikya	1487
Vijaya Manikya I	1488
Mukut Manikya	1489
Dhanya Manikya	1490–1515
Dhwaja Manikya	1515–1520
Deva Manikya	1520–1530
Indra Manikya I	1530–1532
Vijaya Manikya II	1532–1563
Ananta Manikya	1563–1567
Udai Manikya I	1567–1573
Joy Manikya I	1573–1577
Amar Manikya	1577–1585
Rajdhar Manikya I	1586–1600
Ishwar Manikya	1600
Yashodhar Manikya	1600–1623
Interregnum	1623–1626
Kalyan Manikya	1626–1660
Govinda Manikya	1660–1661
Chhatra Manikya	1661–1667
Govinda Manikya	1661–1673
Rama Manikya	1673–1685
Ratna Manikya II	1685–1693
Narendra Manikya	1693–1695
Ratna Manikya II	1695–1712
Mahendra Manikya	1712–1714
Dharma Manikya II	1714–1725
Jagat Manikya	1725–1729
Dharma Manikya II	1729
Mukunda Manikya	1729–1739
Joy Manikya II	1739–1744
Indra Manikya II	1744–1746
Udai Manikya II	1744
Joy Manikya II	1746
Vijaya Manikya III	1746–1748
Lakshman Manikya	1740s/1750s
Interregnum	1750s–1760
Krishna Manikya	1760–1783
Rajdhar Manikya II	1785–1806
Rama Ganga Manikya	1806–1809
Durga Manikya	1809–1813
Rama Ganga Manikya	1813–1826
Kashi Chandra Manikya	1826–1829
Krishna Kishore Manikya	1829–1849
Ishan Chandra Manikya	1849–1862
Bir Chandra Manikya	1862–1896
Radha Kishore Manikya	1896–1909
Birendra Kishore Manikya	1909–1923
Bir Bikram Kishore Manikya	1923–1947
Kirit Bikram Kishore Manikya	1947–1949; 1949–1978 (titular)
Kirit Pradyot Manikya	1978–present (titular)

Tripura monarchy data
- Manikya dynasty (Royal family)
- Agartala (Capital of the kingdom)
- Ujjayanta Palace (Royal residence)
- Pushbanta Palace (Royal residence)
- Neermahal (Royal residence)
- Rajmala (Royal chronicle)
- Tripura Buranji (Chronicle)
- Chaturdasa Devata (Family deities)

Vijaya Manikya I (d. c.1488) was the Maharaja of Tripura briefly during the late 15th century.

A minor when he ascended the throne, Vijaya succeeded upon the assassination of his predecessor Pratap Manikya, who may have been his father. His reign is omitted from the Rajmala, the royal chronicle of Tripura, though a copper plate produced in 1488 which is inscribed with his name provides a timeframe for his rule. It is also believed that the Rajmala confused Vijaya with his more famous relative of the same name, Vijaya Manikya II, conflicting some details of his life with the latter.

He appears to have spent his reign under the control of his maternal uncle, the army chief Daityanarayan, who was the true power in the kingdom. The latter also had his daughter married to the young king. However, Vijaya seems to have only held the throne briefly and died young, with the coinage minted the following year bearing the name of Pratap's younger brother Mukut Manikya.
