= Manikya dynasty =

Indian ruling house of Tripura (c. 1400–1949)

Manikya
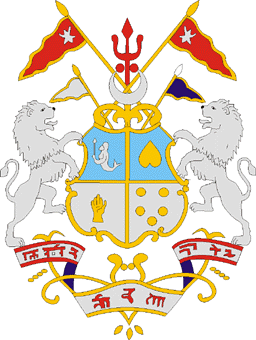
- Parent house: Lunar dynasty (legendary)
- Country: Twipra Kingdom; Tripura State
- Founded: c. 1400
- Founder: Maha Manikya
- Current head: Kirit Pradyot Manikya (titular)
- Final ruler: Kirit Bikram Kishore Manikya
- Titles: Fa; Raja; Maharaja
- Deposition: 1949; 77 years ago

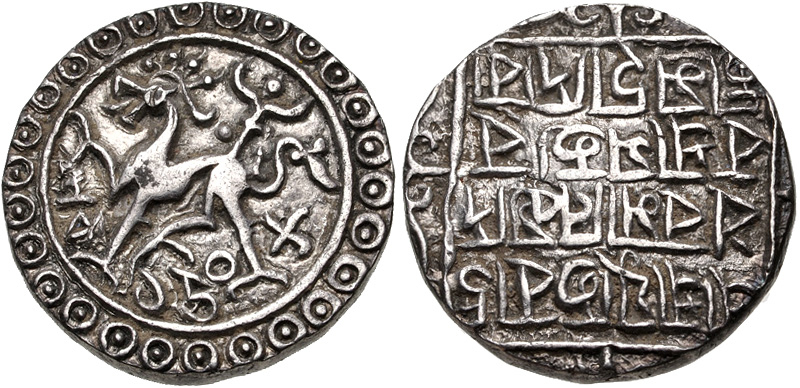
Coinage of Rajadhara Manikya (1586–1599 CE), king of Tripura.

The Manikya dynasty was the ruling house of the Twipra Kingdom and later the princely Tripura State, what is now the Indian state of Tripura. Ruling since the early 15th century, the dynasty at its height controlled a large swathe of the north-east of the Indian subcontinent. After coming under British influence, in 1809 they transitioned from feudal monarchs into rulers of a princely state, though the Manikyas maintained control of the region until 1949, when it ascended in union with India.

== History ==
The Rajmala, the chronicle of the kings of Tripura, traces the Manikyas descent from Druhya, a son of the legendary Lunar dynasty monarch Yayati. An unbroken line of 144 (likely mythological) Tripura monarchs is subsequently listed up to the ascension of one Ratna Fa, who is stated to have become the first Manikya when Sultan of Bengalgranted him the title. However, it is now believed that the Rajmala had been mistaken in the genealogy and chronology of the initial Manikya rulers. Numismatic evidence suggests that the first historical Manikya was in fact Maha Manikya, a Tripuri chief who founded the kingdom after establishing dominance over neighbouring tribes in the early 1400s. This monarch then took the title "Manikya" in honour of a historic victory over Bengal, with the name being inherited by his descendants.

Maha Manikya's early successors won considerable military success and are said to have conquered territory in Bengal, Assam and Burma. Tripura reached its greatest extent in the 16th century under kings such as Dhanya Manikya and Vijaya Manikya II, with its lands stretching from the Garo Hills in the north to the Bay of Bengal in the south. As monarchs of a Hindu kingdom, the Manikyas developed a rivalry with the successive Muslim rulers of Bengal, coming into conflict with Sultans, governors and Nawabs before being brought under Mughal suzerainty in the early 17th century. As Mughal power waned, the antagonism with Bengal re-erupted, which drove the Manikyas to first approach the British for aid. In 1761, Tripura came under British influence and became a princely protectorate, although Manikya dynasty retained the control of the region.

In 1870, Bir Chandra Manikya ascended the throne and began a series of political reforms to his kingdom, modelling his government on the British system. A lover of the culture of Bengal, Bengali was adopted by the court under his rule and he developed a friendship with the poet, Rabindranath Tagore. After Tripura was briefly incorporated into the province of Eastern Bengal and Assam at the beginning of the 20th century, the last Manikya monarch, Maharaja Bir Bikram Kishore, chose to come under the jurisdiction of the predominantly Hindu Dominion of India in 1947. The final ascension of Tripura into the modern Indian nation was signed by his widow, Kanchan Prava Devi, in place of the minor Kirit Bikram Kishore, bringing to an end five centuries of Manikya rule.

== List of rulers ==
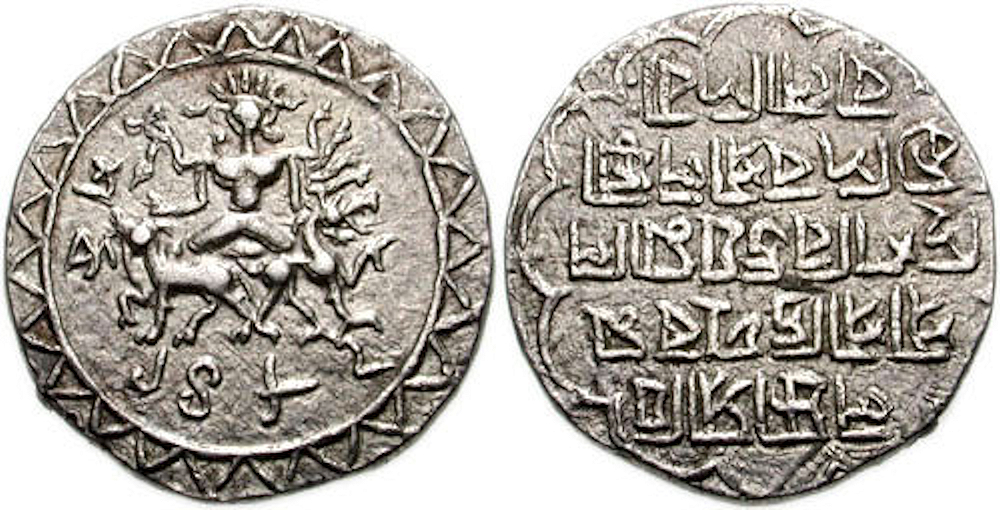
Princely States. Tripura. Vijaya Manikya II (1532-1564), dated 1560

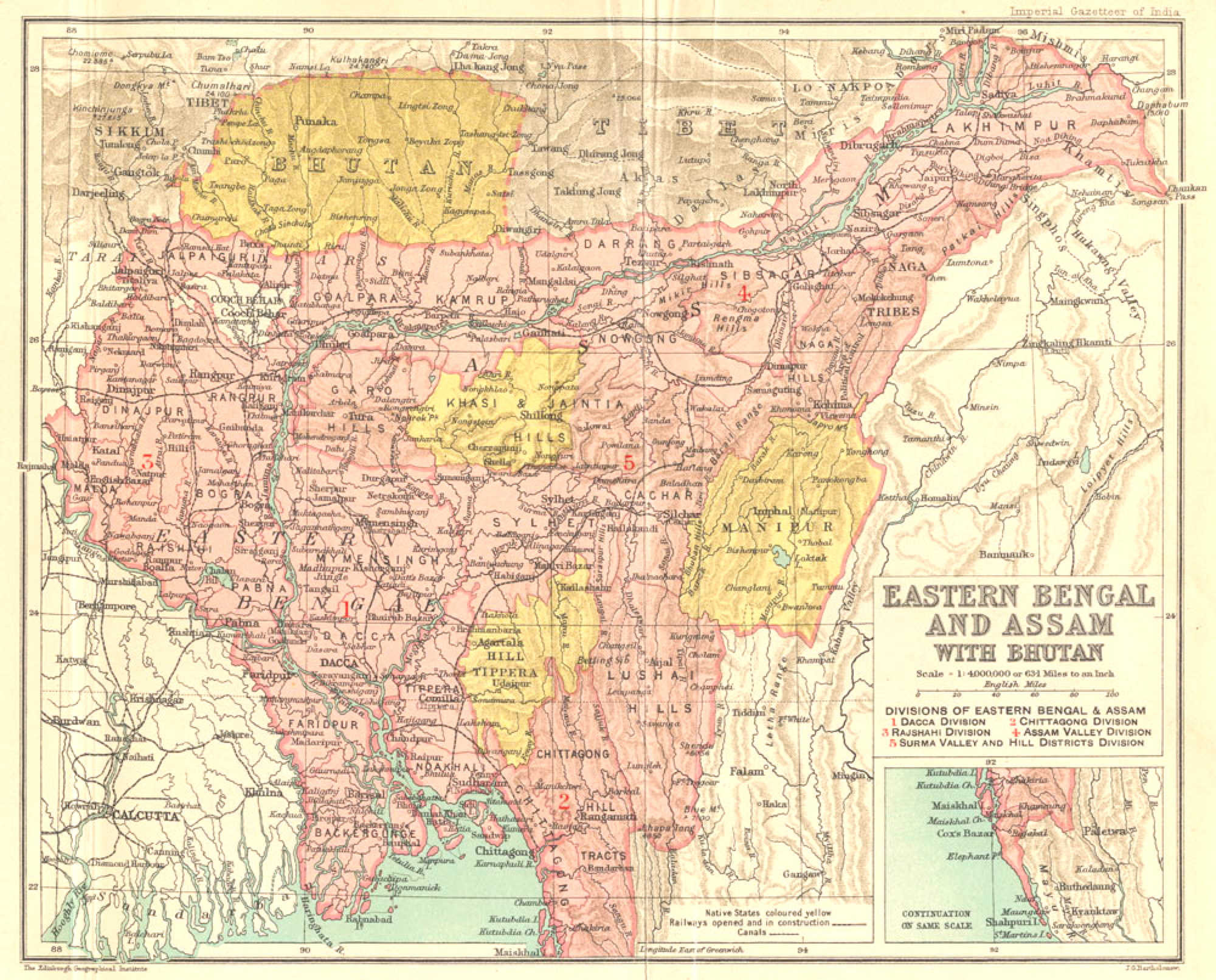
Tripura princely state in 1909

Kingdom of Tripura
- Part of History of Tripura
Kings of Tripura
Maha Manikya	c. 1400–1431
Dharma Manikya I	1431–1462
Ratna Manikya I	1462–1487
Pratap Manikya	1487
Vijaya Manikya I	1488
Mukut Manikya	1489
Dhanya Manikya	1490–1515
Dhwaja Manikya	1515–1520
Deva Manikya	1520–1530
Indra Manikya I	1530–1532
Vijaya Manikya II	1532–1563
Ananta Manikya	1563–1567
Udai Manikya I	1567–1573
Joy Manikya I	1573–1577
Amar Manikya	1577–1585
Rajdhar Manikya I	1586–1600
Ishwar Manikya	1600
Yashodhar Manikya	1600–1623
Interregnum	1623–1626
Kalyan Manikya	1626–1660
Govinda Manikya	1660–1661
Chhatra Manikya	1661–1667
Govinda Manikya	1661–1673
Rama Manikya	1673–1685
Ratna Manikya II	1685–1693
Narendra Manikya	1693–1695
Ratna Manikya II	1695–1712
Mahendra Manikya	1712–1714
Dharma Manikya II	1714–1725
Jagat Manikya	1725–1729
Dharma Manikya II	1729
Mukunda Manikya	1729–1739
Joy Manikya II	1739–1744
Indra Manikya II	1744–1746
Udai Manikya II	1744
Joy Manikya II	1746
Vijaya Manikya III	1746–1748
Lakshman Manikya	1740s/1750s
Interregnum	1750s–1760
Krishna Manikya	1760–1783
Rajdhar Manikya II	1785–1806
Rama Ganga Manikya	1806–1809
Durga Manikya	1809–1813
Rama Ganga Manikya	1813–1826
Kashi Chandra Manikya	1826–1829
Krishna Kishore Manikya	1829–1849
Ishan Chandra Manikya	1849–1862
Bir Chandra Manikya	1862–1896
Radha Kishore Manikya	1896–1909
Birendra Kishore Manikya	1909–1923
Bir Bikram Kishore Manikya	1923–1947
Kirit Bikram Kishore Manikya	1947–1949; 1949–1978 (titular)
Kirit Pradyot Manikya	1978–present (titular)

Tripura monarchy data
- Manikya dynasty (Royal family)
- Agartala (Capital of the kingdom)
- Ujjayanta Palace (Royal residence)
- Pushbanta Palace (Royal residence)
- Neermahal (Royal residence)
- Rajmala (Royal chronicle)
- Tripura Buranji (Chronicle)
- Chaturdasa Devata (Family deities)

Rulers of the Manikya dynasty (c.1400 – 1949)
Name	Reign start	Reign end	Claim	Notes
Maha Manikya	c.1400	1431		
Dharma Manikya I	1431	1462	Son of Maha Manikya	
Ratna Manikya I	1462	c.1487	Son of Dharma Manikya I	
Pratap Manikya	c.1487	c.1487	Son of Ratna Manikya I	
Vijaya Manikya I	1488	1488	Possibly son of Pratap Manikya	
Mukut Manikya	1489	1489	Son of Ratna Manikya I	
Dhanya Manikya	1490	1515	Son of Ratna Manikya I	
Dhwaja Manikya	1515	1520	Son of Dhanya Manikya	
Deva Manikya	1520	1530	Son of Dhanya Manikya	
Indra Manikya I	1530	1532	Son of Deva Manikya	
Vijaya Manikya II	1532	1563	Son of Deva Manikya	
Ananta Manikya	1563	1567	Son of Vijaya Manikya II	
Udai Manikya I	1567	1573	Father-in-law of Ananta Manikya	Claimed the throne following the death of his predecessor, briefly supplanting the ruling dynasty with his own line.
Joy Manikya I	1573	1577	Son of Udai Manikya	
Amar Manikya	1577	1586	Son of Deva Manikya	Restored the Manikya dynasty after killing his predecessor.
Rajdhar Manikya I	1586	1600	Son of Amar Manikya	
Ishwar Manikya	1600	1600	Possibly son of Amar Manikya or Rajdhar Manikya I	
Yashodhar Manikya	1600	1618	Son of Rajdhar Manikya I	Monarchy temporarily overthrown by the Mughal Empire.
Kalyan Manikya	1626	1660	Descendant of Maha Manikya	From a cadet branch of the dynasty. Elected as monarch after Mughal interregnum.
Govinda Manikya	1660	1661	Son of Kalyan Manikya	First reign
Chhatra Manikya	1661	1667	Son of Kalyan Manikya	
Govinda Manikya	1667	1676	Son of Kalyan Manikya	Second reign
Rama Manikya	1676	1685	Son of Govinda Manikya	
Ratna Manikya II	1685	1693	Son of Rama Manikya	First reign
Narendra Manikya	1693	1695	Grandson of Govinda Manikya	
Ratna Manikya II	1695	1712	Son of Rama Manikya	Second reign
Mahendra Manikya	1712	1714	Son of Rama Manikya	
Dharma Manikya II	1714	1725	Son of Rama Manikya	First reign
Jagat Manikya	1725	1729	Great-grandson of Chhatra Manikya	
Dharma Manikya II	1729	1729	Son of Rama Manikya	Second reign
Mukunda Manikya	1729	1739	Son of Rama Manikya	
Joy Manikya II	1739	1744	Great-great-grandson of Kalyan Manikya	First reign
Indra Manikya II	1744	1746	Son of Mukunda Manikya	
Udai Manikya II	c. 1744	c. 1744	Son of Dharma Manikya II	Briefly laid claim to the throne during a power struggle between his relatives.
Joy Manikya II	1746	1746	Great-great-grandson of Kalyan Manikya	Second reign
Vijaya Manikya III	1746	1748	Brother of Joy Manikya II, great-great-grandson of Kalyan Manikya	
Lakshman Manikya	?	?	Grandson of Dharma Manikya II	Ruled as a puppet-monarch under Shamsher Gazi for three years before the latter took the throne for himself.
Krishna Manikya	1760	1783	Son of Mukunda Manikya	
Rajdhar Manikya II	1785	1806	Grandson of Mukunda Manikya	
Rama Ganga Manikya	1806	1809	Son of Rajdhar Manikya II	First reign
Durga Manikya	1809	1813	Son of Lakshman Manikya	
Rama Ganga Manikya	1813	1826	Son of Rajdhar Manikya II	Second reign
Kashi Chandra Manikya	1826	1829	Son of Rajdhar Manikya II	
Krishna Kishore Manikya	1829	1849	Son of Rama Ganga Manikya	
Ishan Chandra Manikya	1849	1862	Son of Krishna Kishore Manikya	
Bir Chandra Manikya	1862	1896	Son of Krishna Kishore Manikya	
Radha Kishore Manikya	1896	1909	Son of Bir Chandra Manikya	
Birendra Kishore Manikya	1909	1923	Son of Radha Kishore Manikya	
Bir Bikram Kishore Manikya	1923	1947	Son of Birendra Kishore Manikya	
Kirit Bikram Kishore Manikya	1947	1949	Son of Bir Bikram Kishore Manikya	
Titular (1949 – 1971)
Kirit Bikram Kishore Manikya	1949	1971 (title abolished)	Son of Bir Bikram Kishore Manikya	

== Family tree ==
Family tree

Maha Manikya; Raja of Tripura r. c. 1400–1431
Dharma Manikya I Raja of Tripura r. 1431–1462	Gagan Fa
Ratna Manikya I Raja of Tripura r. 1462–c. 1487
Dhanya Manikya; Raja of Tripura r. 1490–1515	Pratap Manikya; Raja of Tripura r. c. 1487	Mukut Manikya; Raja of Tripura r. 1489
Dhwaja Manikya; Raja of Tripura r. 1515–1520	Deva Manikya; Raja of Tripura r. 1520–1530	Possibly; Vijaya Manikya I Raja of Tripura r. 1488
Udai Manikya I Raja of Tripura r. 1567–1573	Indra Manikya I Raja of Tripura r. 1530–1532	Vijaya Manikya II; Raja of Tripura r. 1532–1563	Amar Manikya; Raja of Tripura r. 1577–1586
Joy Manikya I Raja of Tripura r. 1573–1577	Ratnavati; Ruler of Chandipur	Ananta Manikya; Raja of Tripura r. 1563–1567	Rajdhar Manikya I Raja of Tripura r. 1586–1600
Yashodhar Manikya; Raja of Tripura r. 1600–1618	Ishwar Manikya; Raja of Tripura r. 1600	Kachu Fa
Kalyan Manikya; Raja of Tripura r. 1626–1660
Govinda Manikya; Raja of Tripura r. 1660–1661 r. 1667–1676	Jagannath Thakur	Chhatra Manikya; Raja of Tripura r. 1661–1667
Rama Manikya; Raja of Tripura r. 1676–1685	Durga Thakur	Surya Pratap Narayan Thakur	Utsab Roy
Ratna Manikya II; Raja of Tripura r. 1685–1693 r. 1695–1712	Mahendra Manikya; Raja of Tripura r. 1712–1714	Dharma Manikya II; Raja of Tripura r. 1714–1725 r. 1729	Mukunda Manikya; Raja of Tripura r. 1729–1739	Narendra Manikya; Raja of Tripura r. 1693–1695	Haradhan Thakur	Vijaya Narayan
Udai Manikya II; Raja of Tripura r. c. 1744	Gadadhar Thakur	Indra Manikya II; Raja of Tripura r. c. 1744–1746	Krishna Manikya; Raja of Tripura r. 1760–1783	Harimani	Joy Manikya II; Raja of Tripura r. c. 1739–1744 r. 1746	Vijaya Manikya III; Raja of Tripura r. 1746–1748	Jagat Manikya; Raja of Tripura r. 1725–1729
Lakshman Manikya; Raja of Tripura r. c. 1740/50s	Rajdhar Manikya II; Raja of Tripura r. 1785–1806	Balaram Manikya; Ruler of Chakla Roshnabad r. 1767
Durga Manikya; Raja of Tripura r. 1809–1813	Rama Ganga Manikya; Raja of Tripura r. 1806–1809 r. 1813–1826	Kashi Chandra Manikya; Raja of Tripura r. 1826–1829
Krishna Kishore Manikya; Raja of Tripura r. 1829–1849
Ishan Chandra Manikya; Raja of Tripura r. 1849–1862	Bir Chandra Manikya; Maharaja of Tripura r. 1862–1896
Radha Kishore Manikya; Maharaja of Tripura r. 1896–1909
Birendra Kishore Manikya; Maharaja of Tripura r. 1909–1923
Bir Bikram Kishore Manikya; Maharaja of Tripura r. 1923–1947
Kirit Bikram Kishore Manikya; Maharaja of Tripura r. 1947–1949
Kirit Pradyot Manikya

Bibliography:
- Choudhury, Achyut Charan (2000) [1910], Srihatter Itibritta: Purbangsho (in Bengali), Kolkata: Kotha, p. 502
- Sarma, Ramani Mohan (1987), Political History of Tripura, Calcutta: Puthipatra

== Bibliography ==
- Bhattacharyya, A. K. (1977). District Census Handbook: North Tripura. Director of Census Operations.
- Boland-Crewe, Tara; Lea, David (2005) [2002]. The Territories and States of India. London: Routledge. ISBN 978-1-135-35625-5.
- Chib, Sukhdev Singh (1988). This beautiful India: Tripura. Ess Ess Publications. ISBN 978-81-7000-039-6.
- Chaudhuri, Dipak Kumar (1999). The Political Agents and the Native Raj: Conflict, Conciliation, and Progress, Tripura Between 1871 to 1890. New Delhi: Mittal Publications. ISBN 978-81-7099-666-8.
- DebBarma, Chandramani (2006). Glory of Tripura civilization: history of Tripura with Kok Borok names of the kings. Parul Prakashani.
- Friedberg, Arthur L.; Friedberg, Ira S. (2009). Gold Coins of the World: From Ancient Times to the Present : an Illustrated Standard Catalogue with Valuations (8 ed.). New Jersey: Coin & Currency Institute. ISBN 978-0-87184-308-1.
- Gan-Chaudhuri, Jagadis (1980). Tripura, the land and its people. Leeladevi Publications. ISBN 9788121004480.
- Lahiri, Bela (1999). "Numismatic Evidence on the Chronolgy and Succession of the rulers of Tripura". The Journal of the Numismatic Society of India. Numismatic Society of India.
- Momin, Mignonette; Mawlong, Cecile A.; Qadri, Fuz̤ail Aḥmad (2006). Society and economy in North-East India. New Delhi: Regency Publications. ISBN 978-81-87498-83-4.
- Nayar, V. K. (2005). Crossing the Frontiers of Conflict in the North East and Jammu and Kashmir: From Real Politik to Ideal Politik. New Delhi: Shipra Publications. ISBN 978-81-7541-218-7.
- Saha, Sudhanshu Bikash (1986). Tribes of Tripura: A Historical Survey. Rupali Book House.
- Singh Rana, J. P. (1998). Marriage and Customs of Tribes of India. New Delhi: M.D. Publications Pvt. Ltd. ISBN 978-81-7533-087-0.
- Sur, Hirendra Kumar (1986). British Relations with the State of Tripura, 1760–1947. Saraswati Book Depot.
