= Ratna Manikya I =

Maharaja of Tripura from 1462 to 1487

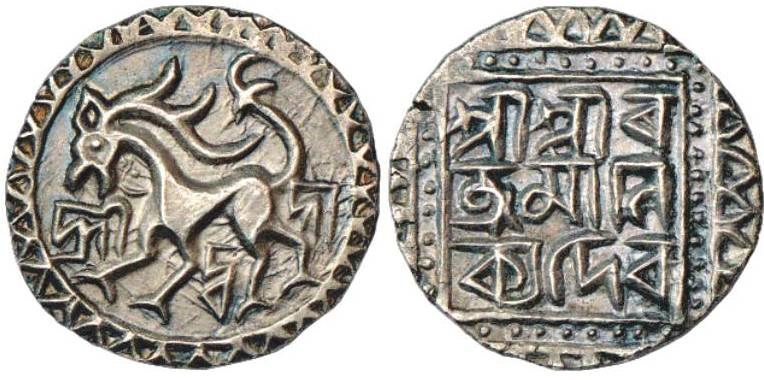
- A silver tanka of Ratna Manikya I (1464)

Maharaja of Tripura
- Reign: 1462–c.1487
- Predecessor: Dharma Manikya I
- Successor: Pratap Manikya
- Died: c.1487
- Consort: Lakshmi Mahadevi
- Issue: Dhanya Manikya; Pratap Manikya; Mukut Manikya
- House: Manikya dynasty
- Father: Dharma Manikya I
- Religion: Hinduism

Kingdom of Tripura
- Part of History of Tripura
Kings of Tripura
Maha Manikya	c. 1400–1431
Dharma Manikya I	1431–1462
Ratna Manikya I	1462–1487
Pratap Manikya	1487
Vijaya Manikya I	1488
Mukut Manikya	1489
Dhanya Manikya	1490–1515
Dhwaja Manikya	1515–1520
Deva Manikya	1520–1530
Indra Manikya I	1530–1532
Vijaya Manikya II	1532–1563
Ananta Manikya	1563–1567
Udai Manikya I	1567–1573
Joy Manikya I	1573–1577
Amar Manikya	1577–1585
Rajdhar Manikya I	1586–1600
Ishwar Manikya	1600
Yashodhar Manikya	1600–1623
Interregnum	1623–1626
Kalyan Manikya	1626–1660
Govinda Manikya	1660–1661
Chhatra Manikya	1661–1667
Govinda Manikya	1661–1673
Rama Manikya	1673–1685
Ratna Manikya II	1685–1693
Narendra Manikya	1693–1695
Ratna Manikya II	1695–1712
Mahendra Manikya	1712–1714
Dharma Manikya II	1714–1725
Jagat Manikya	1725–1729
Dharma Manikya II	1729
Mukunda Manikya	1729–1739
Joy Manikya II	1739–1744
Indra Manikya II	1744–1746
Udai Manikya II	1744
Joy Manikya II	1746
Vijaya Manikya III	1746–1748
Lakshman Manikya	1740s/1750s
Interregnum	1750s–1760
Krishna Manikya	1760–1783
Rajdhar Manikya II	1785–1806
Rama Ganga Manikya	1806–1809
Durga Manikya	1809–1813
Rama Ganga Manikya	1813–1826
Kashi Chandra Manikya	1826–1829
Krishna Kishore Manikya	1829–1849
Ishan Chandra Manikya	1849–1862
Bir Chandra Manikya	1862–1896
Radha Kishore Manikya	1896–1909
Birendra Kishore Manikya	1909–1923
Bir Bikram Kishore Manikya	1923–1947
Kirit Bikram Kishore Manikya	1947–1949; 1949–1978 (titular)
Kirit Pradyot Manikya	1978–present (titular)

Tripura monarchy data
- Manikya dynasty (Royal family)
- Agartala (Capital of the kingdom)
- Ujjayanta Palace (Royal residence)
- Pushbanta Palace (Royal residence)
- Neermahal (Royal residence)
- Rajmala (Royal chronicle)
- Tripura Buranji (Chronicle)
- Chaturdasa Devata (Family deities)

Ratna Manikya I (d. c.1487), also known as Ratna Fa, was the Maharaja of Tripura from 1462 to the late 1480s. Though he had gained the throne by overthrowing his predecessor, Ratna's reign was notable for the peace and prosperity it had entailed in the region. He extensively reformed and modernised the government and closely allied it with neighbouring Bengal, resulting in a lasting cultural influence in Tripura.

== Dating and chronology ==
The Rajmala, the royal chronicle of Tripura, describes Ratna as the first of the kingdoms rulers to assume the title of Manikya, with historians initially placing his reign in the latter half of the thirteenth century. However, coins bearing his name were subsequently discovered which instead proved that his rule had continued until at least 1467. This would place it as being after that of Dharma Manikya I, who had reigned the previous decade. This contradicts the narrative provided by the Rajmala, where Dharma is described as being Ratna's great-grandson, as well as proving that the latter could not have been the first to be called Manikya. It is now believed that Ratna was in fact Dharma's son and that the Manikya cognomen had been associated with the dynasty for a number of generations prior to his ascension.

== Ascension ==
Traditional accounts state that Ratna was the youngest of the eighteen sons of his father, who is named as Dangar Fa (presumably Dharma Manikya). According to legend, Ratna (then known as Ratna Fa) had proven himself to be the worthiest for the throne out of his brothers by passing a test set by their father. The King supposedly had a table set for dinner for the princes, but just as they were about to start eating, thirty hungry dogs were released into the room, despoiling their food. Ratna however, was able to save his meal by throwing rice to the dogs, thus proving his intelligence.

The Rajmala however, doesn't suggest that Ratna had been shown any special favour by his father. Rather, it states that he was sent as a hostage to the royal court in neighbouring Bengal. Dangar Fa then had the kingdom divided into seventeen parts and parcelled out to the remaining princes. These actions may have been done to preempt a potential fratricidal war among his sons over the succession, as well as out of a potential fear that Ratna would dominate his brothers in such a conflict. Ratna however, considered this expulsion to be an act of conspiracy against him and began working to gain the throne.

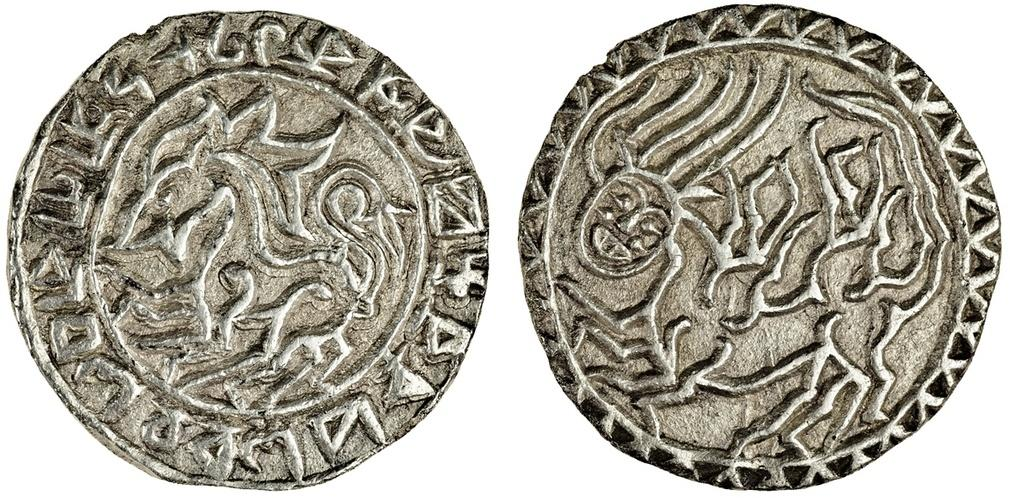
Coin of Ratnamanikya I with dragon

Through his charisma and intelligence, he is said to have gained the affection of the Sultan of Bengal (who chronological evidence identifies as being Rukunuddin Barbak Shah). With the latter's military aid, he launched an assault against Tripura, defeating its armies and taking the throne. Ratna then had his seventeen brothers imprisoned while his father was expelled from the kingdom, later dying in exile. The Rajmala continues that Ratna later revisited Bengal and in gratitude for the Sultan's help, he presented to him an elaborately caparisoned elephant and a ruby (manikya) as gifts. In response, the Sultan awarded him the title of Manikya, (Note: “Manikya” translates to "reddish stone" or "ruby".) which supposedly from then on became a dynastic cognomen. (Note: As previously noted, this is disproved by earlier monarchs of Tripura having already possessed the name.)

== Reign ==
Upon his ascension to the throne, Ratna began an extensive administrative reform of his new kingdom, modelling the changes on his observations of the government of Bengal. The previously unproductive feudal system was reorganised and the government became more complex, with greater numbers of civil servants being employed to maintain it. The Bengali and Persian languages were introduced into the administration in light of the closer ties to Bengal and resources were delegated to the improvement of agriculture.

Particularly influential were Ratna's experiences with Bengali Hindus, which resulted in him requesting Barbak Shah to send some to live in Tripura. From 1464 to 1468, four thousand families were dispatched, settling in the ancient capital Rangamati, as well as Ratnapur, Yasopur and Hirapur. These were professionals, cultivators and artisans employed to bring the administrative and economic state of Tripura in-line with that of Bengal. Among them were Brahmins, Vaidyas and Kayasthas. Two members of the latter group, Khandava Ghosha and Pandita Raja, rose to become respected members of Ratna's council of ministers on account of their merit. These cultural influences began a process of acculturation, serving to gradually transform Tripura from its previous semi-tribal state.

This Bengali influence was further felt in the currency, with Ratna being the first monarch to mint coins, mimicking the weight and fabric of those struck by the Sultans of Bengal, whilst also providing evidence of the religious conditions at the time. Though the Rajmala references Ratna's devotion to the Hindu deities Vishnu and Narayana, this numismatic evidence also alludes to his worship of Shiva and Parvati through the titles and legends he employed. Other coins also mention his veneration of the Chaturdasha Devata (fourteen deities). All of this indicates that Ratna patronised all sects equally and, alongside records of his charitable deeds (Dāna), show his attempt to adhere to the ideal of a Hindu ruler as advised in the Puranas and Smriti. Historian Ramani Mohan Sarma concludes that, in reference to Tripuri society as a whole, this displayed "the final transformation of the Mongoloid (Bodo) pantheon of an important section of the Indo-Mongoloids into the orthodox Hindu pantheon of the Paranas".

== Death and legacy ==
Ratna's reign is believed to have ended around 1487, concluding a period of peace and progress. It has been viewed as one of the most glorious eras in Tripura's history. Though his rule had laid a stable foundation for his dynasty, his death precipitated a period of confusion and anarchy, with army leaders gaining considerable influence. The reigns of his immediate successors were subsequently cut short as a result of military intrigues.

It may also be that Ratna had done harm to the security and sovereignty of Tripura in the long term. It has been argued that by enlisting the aid of Bengal in his bid for the throne, he had opened the floodgates for future incursions by the neighbouring state. His costly gifts to Barbak Shah had revealed the wealth of Tripura to the foreign court, possibly tempting them towards invasion. This may be shown by the multiple raids of Alauddin Husain Shah in the following decades, as well as subsequent assaults in the 17th century. All these served towards a general corrosion of the power of Tripura's rulers.

== Bibliography ==
- Bhattacharji, Romesh (2002). Lands of early dawn: North East of India. Rupa & Co. ISBN 978-81-7167-963-8.
- Bhattacharyya, Banikantha (1986). Tripura Administration: The Era of Modernisation, 1870–1972. Delhi: Mittal Publications.
- Bruce, Colin R. (1981). The Standard Guide to South Asian Coins and Paper Money Since 1556 AD. Krause Publications. ISBN 978-0-87341-069-4.
- Deb Barma, Aloy (2024). "Talking Back through Peripheral Visions and Negotiating Identity: Kokborok and Bengali Films and Music Videos in Tripura". Journal of Film and Video. 76 (2). doi:10.5406/19346018.76.2.05. ISSN 0742-4671.
- Gan-Chaudhuri, Jagadis (1980). Tripura, the land and its people. Leeladevi Publications. ISBN 9788121004480.
- Nayar, V. K. (2005). Crossing the Frontiers of Conflict in the North East and Jammu and Kashmir: From Real Politik to Ideal Politik. New Delhi: Shipra Publications. ISBN 978-81-7541-218-7.
- Roychoudhury, N. R. (1980). Causes of the tribal uprisings in Tripura in the nineteenth century. Proceedings of the North East India History Association, First Session, Shillong, 1980. North East India History Association. Session.
- Saha, Sudhanshu Bikash (1986). Tribes of Tripura: A Historical Survey. Rupali Book House.
- Sarma, Ramani Mohan (1987). Political History of Tripura. Puthipatra.
- Singh, Jai Prakash (1999). An Introduction to the History of the Manikyas of Tripura. Shillong: North Eastern Hill University Publications.
- Sinha, S. P. (2007). Lost Opportunities: 50 Years of Insurgency in the North-east and India's Response. New Delhi: Lancer Publishers. ISBN 978-81-7062-162-1.
- Sur, Hirendra Kumar (1986). British Relations with the State of Tripura, 1760–1947. Saraswati Book Depot.
