= Bir Chandra Manikya =

H.R.H. Maharaja Bir Chandra Manikya Debbarman Bahadur
- King of Tripura
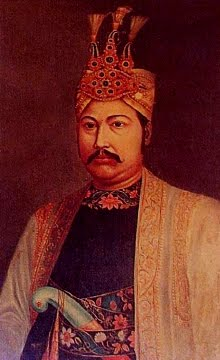
- Reign: 1862-1896
- Predecessor: Ishan Chandra Manikya
- Successor: Radha Kishore Manikya
- Consort: Iswari Rajeshwari Mahadevi (Kaboklei) Ningthem Chanu Bhanumati; Maharani Manamohini
- House: Manikya Dynasty
- Religion: Hinduism

Kingdom of Tripura
- Part of History of Tripura
Kings of Tripura
Maha Manikya	c. 1400–1431
Dharma Manikya I	1431–1462
Ratna Manikya I	1462–1487
Pratap Manikya	1487
Vijaya Manikya I	1488
Mukut Manikya	1489
Dhanya Manikya	1490–1515
Dhwaja Manikya	1515–1520
Deva Manikya	1520–1530
Indra Manikya I	1530–1532
Vijaya Manikya II	1532–1563
Ananta Manikya	1563–1567
Udai Manikya I	1567–1573
Joy Manikya I	1573–1577
Amar Manikya	1577–1585
Rajdhar Manikya I	1586–1600
Ishwar Manikya	1600
Yashodhar Manikya	1600–1623
Interregnum	1623–1626
Kalyan Manikya	1626–1660
Govinda Manikya	1660–1661
Chhatra Manikya	1661–1667
Govinda Manikya	1661–1673
Rama Manikya	1673–1685
Ratna Manikya II	1685–1693
Narendra Manikya	1693–1695
Ratna Manikya II	1695–1712
Mahendra Manikya	1712–1714
Dharma Manikya II	1714–1725
Jagat Manikya	1725–1729
Dharma Manikya II	1729
Mukunda Manikya	1729–1739
Joy Manikya II	1739–1744
Indra Manikya II	1744–1746
Udai Manikya II	1744
Joy Manikya II	1746
Vijaya Manikya III	1746–1748
Lakshman Manikya	1740s/1750s
Interregnum	1750s–1760
Krishna Manikya	1760–1783
Rajdhar Manikya II	1785–1806
Rama Ganga Manikya	1806–1809
Durga Manikya	1809–1813
Rama Ganga Manikya	1813–1826
Kashi Chandra Manikya	1826–1829
Krishna Kishore Manikya	1829–1849
Ishan Chandra Manikya	1849–1862
Bir Chandra Manikya	1862–1896
Radha Kishore Manikya	1896–1909
Birendra Kishore Manikya	1909–1923
Bir Bikram Kishore Manikya	1923–1947
Kirit Bikram Kishore Manikya	1947–1949; 1949–1978 (titular)
Kirit Pradyot Manikya	1978–present (titular)

Tripura monarchy data
- Manikya dynasty (Royal family)
- Agartala (Capital of the kingdom)
- Ujjayanta Palace (Royal residence)
- Pushbanta Palace (Royal residence)
- Neermahal (Royal residence)
- Rajmala (Royal chronicle)
- Tripura Buranji (Chronicle)
- Chaturdasa Devata (Family deities)

Maharaja Bir Chandra Manikya Bahadur of the Manikya Dynasty was the king of Tripura from 1862 to 1896.

== Biography ==
Bir Chandra Manikya is regarded as the architect of modern Agartala city. In 1862, he started the urbanisation of the Agartala. In 1871 he established the Agartala Municipality. He established Umakanta Academy, the first western school in Tripura, in 1890.

An enthusiastic photographer, he was the first king in India to organize an annual photographic exhibition in his palace. More than 100 years after his death, the Maharaja's Foto ka Karkhana, a fully equipped studio, came to light in Madho Niwas, inside the palace. He was a member of the Royal Photographic Society from 1896 until his death.

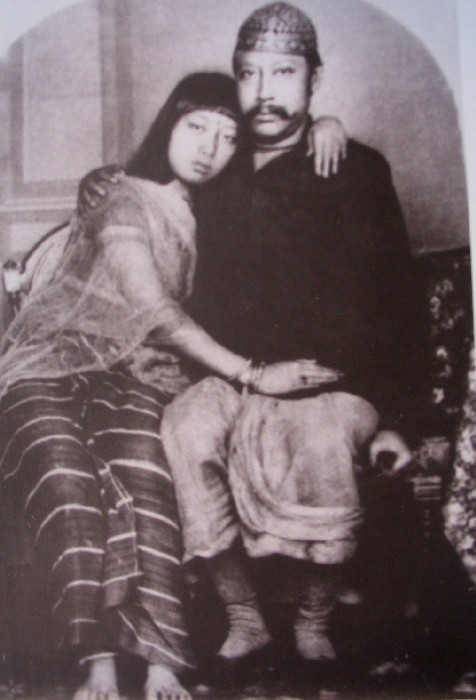
Maharaja Birchandra with the queen Maharani Manamohini in 1880

== Legacy ==
The Tagore family had links with the princes of Tripura since the time Dwarkanath Tagore but the relationship between the two families was closest during the time of Bir Chandra's reign. Rabindranath Tagore had a friendly relationship with the king. Three important works of Rabindranath Tagore — Mukuta (1885), Rajarshi (c. 1885), and Visarjana (1890) were directly influenced by his association with the royal family of Tripura. Bir Chandra Manikya was also one of the main characters of the novel Prathom Alo (প্রথম আলো) by Sunil Gangopadhyay.

== See also ==
- Manikya dynasty
- Tripura (princely state)
