= Amar Manikya =

Maharaja of Tripura from 1577 to 1586

Maharaja of Tripura
- Reign: 1577-1586
- Predecessor: Joy Manikya I
- Successor: Rajdhar Manikya I
- Died: 1586
- Issue: Rajadurlabha Manikya; Rajdhar Manikya I; Jujhar Singh
- House: Manikya dynasty
- Father: Deva Manikya
- Religion: Hinduism

Kingdom of Tripura
- Part of History of Tripura
Kings of Tripura
Maha Manikya	c. 1400–1431
Dharma Manikya I	1431–1462
Ratna Manikya I	1462–1487
Pratap Manikya	1487
Vijaya Manikya I	1488
Mukut Manikya	1489
Dhanya Manikya	1490–1515
Dhwaja Manikya	1515–1520
Deva Manikya	1520–1530
Indra Manikya I	1530–1532
Vijaya Manikya II	1532–1563
Ananta Manikya	1563–1567
Udai Manikya I	1567–1573
Joy Manikya I	1573–1577
Amar Manikya	1577–1585
Rajdhar Manikya I	1586–1600
Ishwar Manikya	1600
Yashodhar Manikya	1600–1623
Interregnum	1623–1626
Kalyan Manikya	1626–1660
Govinda Manikya	1660–1661
Chhatra Manikya	1661–1667
Govinda Manikya	1661–1673
Rama Manikya	1673–1685
Ratna Manikya II	1685–1693
Narendra Manikya	1693–1695
Ratna Manikya II	1695–1712
Mahendra Manikya	1712–1714
Dharma Manikya II	1714–1725
Jagat Manikya	1725–1729
Dharma Manikya II	1729
Mukunda Manikya	1729–1739
Joy Manikya II	1739–1744
Indra Manikya II	1744–1746
Udai Manikya II	1744
Joy Manikya II	1746
Vijaya Manikya III	1746–1748
Lakshman Manikya	1740s/1750s
Interregnum	1750s–1760
Krishna Manikya	1760–1783
Rajdhar Manikya II	1785–1806
Rama Ganga Manikya	1806–1809
Durga Manikya	1809–1813
Rama Ganga Manikya	1813–1826
Kashi Chandra Manikya	1826–1829
Krishna Kishore Manikya	1829–1849
Ishan Chandra Manikya	1849–1862
Bir Chandra Manikya	1862–1896
Radha Kishore Manikya	1896–1909
Birendra Kishore Manikya	1909–1923
Bir Bikram Kishore Manikya	1923–1947
Kirit Bikram Kishore Manikya	1947–1949; 1949–1978 (titular)
Kirit Pradyot Manikya	1978–present (titular)

Tripura monarchy data
- Manikya dynasty (Royal family)
- Agartala (Capital of the kingdom)
- Ujjayanta Palace (Royal residence)
- Pushbanta Palace (Royal residence)
- Neermahal (Royal residence)
- Rajmala (Royal chronicle)
- Tripura Buranji (Chronicle)
- Chaturdasa Devata (Family deities)

Amar Manikya was the Maharaja of Tripura from 1577 to 1586.

== Early life ==
Born Amardeva, he was a son of Maharaja Deva Manikya, but was only a prince as another family had taken over the throne.

General Ranagan Narayan, the de facto ruler of Twipra, was jealous of the popularity enjoyed by Amar. Narayan invited him to a dinner where he planned to have Amar killed. However, Amar escaped and rallied his supporters to capture Narayan and have his head cut off. When Joy Manikya I, the puppet Maharaja, demanded an explanation for Narayan's death, Amar dispatched his troops against Joy, who attempted to flee before being overtaken and also beheaded. Joy's death is believed to have occurred in 1577, having reigned about 4 years. Amaradeva subsequently took power under the name Amar Manikya, thus restoring the throne to the original ruling dynasty.

== Reign ==
Amar Manikya was digging a tank, now known as Amar Sagar, in his capital at Udaipur for religious reasons. He demanded various chieftains to supply labour for this task and pay tribute to Twipra. The Rajmala chronicles highlights all the donations provided by the Baro-Bhuiyans, numbering at least over 500 labourers. The zamindar of Taraf, Syed Musa, was the only ruler to refuse to accept such subordination as he viewed Taraf to be an independent principality. This angered Amar Manikya and started the Battle of Jilkua in Chunarughat in 1581, which was most likely the first military expedition in Amar's reign. Musa called upon Fateh Khan, a Baro-Bhuyan zamindar of Sylhet, who came to his aid. Isa Khan was appointed as Manikya's naval commander. The Tripuris were victorious and Syed Musa and his son Syed Adam were taken as prisoners. Syed Musa was imprisoned in Udaipur, but Adam was eventually set free. The Twipra army then proceeded to Gudhrail, via Dinarpur and the Surma River, where they defeated Fateh Khan with the help of their elephants. Khan was captured and transported to Udaipur via Dulali and Ita. He was treated well and later released. Amar Manikya was very proud of the successful conquest of Taraf and even minted a coin referring to himself as the Conqueror of Sylhet. This coin was in the possession of Bir Bikram Kishore Debbarman in the 20th century.

Following the conquest of Noakhali and Chittagong by the Arakanese king Min Phalaung, a large contingent was sent by Amar Manikya into the occupied regions to drive out the invaders. The army landed and captured six enemy camps successively before halting at Ramu. The Arakanese, following a failed retaliatory assault, blockaded the troops, resulting in the latter's supplies soon dwindling. Additionally, the Portuguese soldiers who formed part of the Tripura army were enticed to desert, turning their camps over to the enemy. This forced the Tripuri to begin retreating back to Chittagong, though at the Karnaphuli River, they were attacked and defeated by the Arakanese, resulting in heavy casualties. However, upon reaching Chittagong, the army reorganised and launched a counter-assault, capturing seven of the enemy fortresses and forcing their retreat.

== Death and legacy ==
After a brief hiatus, a second invasion of Chittagong was launched by Min Phalaung. The Tripura army were routed in the ensuing conflict, with Amar's son Jujhar Singh being killed and his other son Rajdhar suffering a serious bullet wound. The Arakanese then invaded Tripura itself, penetrating all the way to Udaipur and having it sacked and plundered. As a result of this humiliation, Amar Manikya committed suicide, with his wife later performing Sati in his funeral pyre. Amar was succeeded by his son Rajdhar Manikya I.

== Bibliography ==
- Khan, Abdul Mabud (1999). The Maghs: a Buddhist community in Bangladesh. University Press.
- Long, James (1850). "Analysis of the Bengali Poem Raj Mala, or Chronicles of Tripura". Journal of the Asiatic Society of Bengal. XIX. Calcutta: Asiatic society: 547.
