= Rajdhar Manikya I =

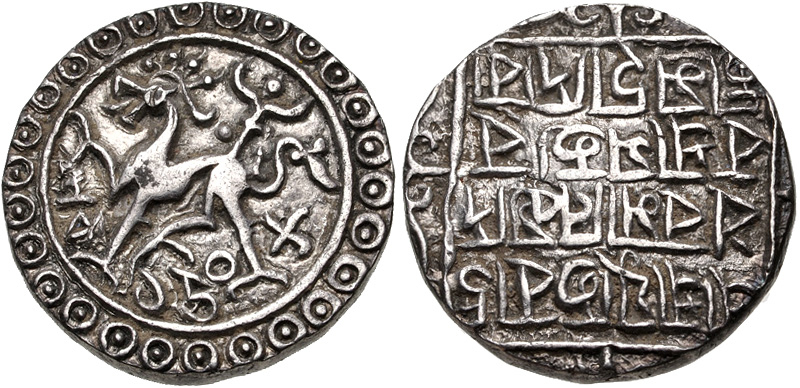
- Silver tanka of Rajadhara Manikya (1586–1599 CE), king of Tripura.

Maharaja of Tripura
- Reign: 1586–1600
- Predecessor: Amar Manikya
- Successor: Ishwar Manikya
- Born: Rajdhar Narayan
- Died: 1600
- Consort: Satyavati
- Issue: Ishwar Manikya (possibly); Yashodhar Manikya
- House: Manikya dynasty
- Father: Amar Manikya
- Religion: Hinduism

Kingdom of Tripura
- Part of History of Tripura
Kings of Tripura
Maha Manikya	c. 1400–1431
Dharma Manikya I	1431–1462
Ratna Manikya I	1462–1487
Pratap Manikya	1487
Vijaya Manikya I	1488
Mukut Manikya	1489
Dhanya Manikya	1490–1515
Dhwaja Manikya	1515–1520
Deva Manikya	1520–1530
Indra Manikya I	1530–1532
Vijaya Manikya II	1532–1563
Ananta Manikya	1563–1567
Udai Manikya I	1567–1573
Joy Manikya I	1573–1577
Amar Manikya	1577–1585
Rajdhar Manikya I	1586–1600
Ishwar Manikya	1600
Yashodhar Manikya	1600–1623
Interregnum	1623–1626
Kalyan Manikya	1626–1660
Govinda Manikya	1660–1661
Chhatra Manikya	1661–1667
Govinda Manikya	1661–1673
Rama Manikya	1673–1685
Ratna Manikya II	1685–1693
Narendra Manikya	1693–1695
Ratna Manikya II	1695–1712
Mahendra Manikya	1712–1714
Dharma Manikya II	1714–1725
Jagat Manikya	1725–1729
Dharma Manikya II	1729
Mukunda Manikya	1729–1739
Joy Manikya II	1739–1744
Indra Manikya II	1744–1746
Udai Manikya II	1744
Joy Manikya II	1746
Vijaya Manikya III	1746–1748
Lakshman Manikya	1740s/1750s
Interregnum	1750s–1760
Krishna Manikya	1760–1783
Rajdhar Manikya II	1785–1806
Rama Ganga Manikya	1806–1809
Durga Manikya	1809–1813
Rama Ganga Manikya	1813–1826
Kashi Chandra Manikya	1826–1829
Krishna Kishore Manikya	1829–1849
Ishan Chandra Manikya	1849–1862
Bir Chandra Manikya	1862–1896
Radha Kishore Manikya	1896–1909
Birendra Kishore Manikya	1909–1923
Bir Bikram Kishore Manikya	1923–1947
Kirit Bikram Kishore Manikya	1947–1949; 1949–1978 (titular)
Kirit Pradyot Manikya	1978–present (titular)

Tripura monarchy data
- Manikya dynasty (Royal family)
- Agartala (Capital of the kingdom)
- Ujjayanta Palace (Royal residence)
- Pushbanta Palace (Royal residence)
- Neermahal (Royal residence)
- Rajmala (Royal chronicle)
- Tripura Buranji (Chronicle)
- Chaturdasa Devata (Family deities)

Rajdhar Manikya I (d. 1600), also spelt Rajadhara Manikya, was the Maharaja of Tripura from 1586 to 1600. Formerly a warrior-prince who fought with distinction during his father's reign, upon his own ascension to the throne, Rajdhar showed little interest in such matters, instead becoming occupied with religious pursuits. The decline of Tripura is thought to have begun during his reign.

== As heir apparent ==
Born Rajdhar Narayan, he was the second son of Maharaja Amar Manikya. Following the premature death of his elder brother Rajadurlabha, Rajdhar was named heir apparent in his place and granted his former title of Yuvraj.

Alongside his younger brothers, Amaradurlabha and Jujhar Singh, Rajdhar contributed significantly to his father's military campaigns. In 1581, in what was likely the first expedition of Amar's reign, Rajdhar was dispatched against the insubordinate zamindar of Taraf, Syed Musa. When the latter fled to Fateh Khan, the ruler of Sylhet, Rajdhar marched a formidable military force into the region. In the battle that followed, Khan was defeated and Syed Musa arrested. Rajdhar escorted Khan to Udaipur, where he submitted to the Maharaja's authority.

Following the conquest of Noakhali and Chittagong by the Arakanese king Min Phalaung, Rajdhar, commanding a large contingent, was sent into the occupied regions to drive out the invaders. The army landed in Chittagong and Rajdhar, alongside his brother Amaradurlabha and the generals Chandradarpa-Narayan and Chattrajit Najir, led the capture of six enemy camps successively before halting at Ramu. The Arakanese, following a failed retaliatory assault, blockaded the troops, resulting in the latter's supplies soon dwindling. Additionally, the Portuguese soldiers who formed part of the Tripura army were enticed to desert, turning their camps over to the enemy. This forced the Tripuri to begin retreating back to Chittagong, though at the Karnaphuli River, they were attacked and defeated by the Arakanese, resulting in heavy casualties. However, upon reaching Chittagong, Rajdhar had the army reorganised and launched a counter-assault, capturing seven of the enemy fortresses and forcing their retreat.

After a brief hiatus, a second invasion of Chittagong was launched by Min Phalaung. The Tripura army were routed in the ensuing conflict, with Rajdhar's younger brother Jujhar Singh being killed and he himself suffering a serious bullet wound. The Arakanese then invaded Tripura itself, penetrating all the way to Udaipur and having it sacked and plundered. As a result of this humiliation, Rajdhar's father committed suicide, with his mother later performing Sati in the king's funeral pyre.

== Reign ==
With the Arakanese having abandoned the capital after their pillaging, Rajdhar returned and claimed his father's throne, adopting the traditional royal title of "Manikya". His reign is believed to have commenced in 1586.

Rajdhar proved himself to be a ruler of spiritual leanings. Avoiding the battlefield and having little interest in the administration of his kingdom, he instead devoted himself to religious pursuits. A patron of Vaishnavism, under his rule the influence of the sect spread significantly throughout Tripura. A temple to Vishnu was constructed in Udaipur and eight Brahmins were employed to perform devotional songs before the idol perpetually. Its gardens were adorned with fruit and flowering plants and the Maharaja visited it daily. Rajdhar was also considered notable for his great respect for Brahmins, participating in religious discussions with the 200 in his court and distributing significant amounts of land to them, in spite of opposition from his nobles.

It is perhaps because of Rajdhar's devout manner that the ruler of Bengal invaded Tripura during this time, though the practical reason was likely to obtain access to the kingdom's elephants. This campaign ultimately failed, with the attacking army being repelled by the veteran general Chandradarpa-Narayan. The actual identity of the invader is uncertain, though the most likely individual would have been the Mughal governor of the region, Man Singh I.

== Death and legacy ==
Whilst walking on the banks of the Gomti River, Rajdhar, absorbed in meditation and drinking water in which an image of Vishnu had been washed, fell into the river and drowned. His death is believed to have occurred in 1600.

Rajdhar is depicted in the Rajmala as a benevolent monarch, affable and religious-minded, and charitable both with Brahmins and his subjects; a reputation he likely deserved. However, it was through his aloofness in regards to the running of his kingdom that Tripura's decline began. Royal power waned and lost territory was never regained, with the morale of the military also being decreased. This culminated in the kingdom's nadir during the reign of his son Yashodhar Manikya, who ultimately fell victim to external imperial aggression.

Rajdhar was succeeded by Ishwar Manikya, whose relation to him is uncertain.

== Bibliography ==
- Bhattacharyya, Banikantha (1986). Tripura Administration: The Era of Modernisation, 1870-1972. Delhi: Mittal Publications.
- Bhattasali, Nalini Kanta (1928). "Bengal Chiefs' Struggle for Independence in the Reigns of Akbar and Jahangir". Bengal: Past and Present. 35. Calcutta Historical Society.
- Chib, Sukhdev Singh (1988). Tripura. Ess Ess Publications. ISBN 978-81-7000-039-6.
- Das, Ratna (1997). Art and Architecture of Tripura. Tribal Research Institute, Government of Tripura.
- Khan, Abdul Mabud (1999). The Maghs: a Buddhist community in Bangladesh. University Press.
- Khan, Nurul Islam (1977). Bangladesh District Gazetteers: Comilla. Bangladesh Government Press.
- Long, James (1850). "Analysis of the Bengali Poem Raj Mala, or Chronicles of Tripura". Journal of the Asiatic Society of Bengal. XIX. Calcutta: Asiatic society.
- Majumdar, Ramesh Chandra (1948). The History of Bengal. Vol. II. Dhaka: University of Dacca.
- Majumdar, Ramesh Chandra (1974). History of mediaeval Bengal. G. Bharadwaj.
- Roychoudhury, Nalini Ranjan (1983). Tripura through the ages: a short history of Tripura from the earliest times to 1947 A.D. Sterling.
- Sarma, Ramani Mohan (1978). "Manikya Administration". Journal of the Asiatic Society. XX. Asiatic Society.
- Sarma, Ramani Mohan (1987). Political History of Tripura. Calcutta: Puthipatra.
