= Rajmala =

15th century chronicle of the Kings of Tripura, written in Kokborok verse

Kingdom of Tripura
- Part of History of Tripura
Kings of Tripura
Maha Manikya	c. 1400–1431
Dharma Manikya I	1431–1462
Ratna Manikya I	1462–1487
Pratap Manikya	1487
Vijaya Manikya I	1488
Mukut Manikya	1489
Dhanya Manikya	1490–1515
Dhwaja Manikya	1515–1520
Deva Manikya	1520–1530
Indra Manikya I	1530–1532
Vijaya Manikya II	1532–1563
Ananta Manikya	1563–1567
Udai Manikya I	1567–1573
Joy Manikya I	1573–1577
Amar Manikya	1577–1585
Rajdhar Manikya I	1586–1600
Ishwar Manikya	1600
Yashodhar Manikya	1600–1623
Interregnum	1623–1626
Kalyan Manikya	1626–1660
Govinda Manikya	1660–1661
Chhatra Manikya	1661–1667
Govinda Manikya	1661–1673
Rama Manikya	1673–1685
Ratna Manikya II	1685–1693
Narendra Manikya	1693–1695
Ratna Manikya II	1695–1712
Mahendra Manikya	1712–1714
Dharma Manikya II	1714–1725
Jagat Manikya	1725–1729
Dharma Manikya II	1729
Mukunda Manikya	1729–1739
Joy Manikya II	1739–1744
Indra Manikya II	1744–1746
Udai Manikya II	1744
Joy Manikya II	1746
Vijaya Manikya III	1746–1748
Lakshman Manikya	1740s/1750s
Interregnum	1750s–1760
Krishna Manikya	1760–1783
Rajdhar Manikya II	1785–1806
Rama Ganga Manikya	1806–1809
Durga Manikya	1809–1813
Rama Ganga Manikya	1813–1826
Kashi Chandra Manikya	1826–1829
Krishna Kishore Manikya	1829–1849
Ishan Chandra Manikya	1849–1862
Bir Chandra Manikya	1862–1896
Birendra Kishore Manikya	1909–1923
Bir Bikram Kishore Manikya	1923–1947
Kirit Bikram Kishore Manikya	1947–1949; 1949–1978 (titular)
Kirit Pradyot Manikya	1978–present (titular)

Tripura monarchy data
- Manikya dynasty (Royal family)
- Agartala (Capital of the kingdom)
- Ujjayanta Palace (Royal residence)
- Pushbanta Palace (Royal residence)
- Neermahal (Royal residence)
- Rajmala (Royal chronicle)
- Tripura Buranji (Chronicle)
- Chaturdasa Devata (Family deities)

Rajmala is a chronicle of the Kings of Tripura, written in Bengali verse in the 15th century under Dharma Manikya I.

== Overview ==
The Rajmala chronicles the history of the Manikya kings of Tripura. While it serves as an invaluable source of information for the region, its historical accuracy in some aspects has been doubted.

The text is split up into six parts, written over the course of several centuries under the patronage of different Tripura monarchs. It was initially commissioned by Dharma Manikya I in 1458, who bestowed the task upon the royal priest Durlabhendra and two Brahman pandits, Sukheshwar and Baneshwar. Their work formed the first part of the text and covered the traditional period of Tripura's history and incorporated various mythological accounts. Subsequent portions were composed during the 16th, 17th, 18th and 19th centuries under Amar Manikya, Govinda Manikya, Krishna Manikya and Kashi Chandra Manikya respectively. The entire revised text was finally compiled by Durgamoni Uzir during the reign of Krishna Kishore Manikya in the mid-19th-century.

== Royal genealogy ==
The Rajmala presents a list of 149 kings of Twipra as of 1431. The first king of the chronicle is Chandra, the Moon himself; the seventh is Druhyu, one of the sons of Yayati, a Lunar dynasty in mythology. The 46th king is called Tripur (Tripura) as a kind of mythological eponymous ancestor of the Sanskritic name of the kingdom. The list of historical kings begins with the 145th king, Ratna Fa (fl. 1280). He was the first to assume the title Manikya and as such can be considered the founder of the Manikya Dynasty.

=== Mythological or legendary kings ===
Sl. No.	Name of King	Sl. No.	Name of King
1.	Chandra	26.	Basuman
2.	Budh	27.	Keerti
3.	Pururoba - I	28.	Kaniyan
4.	Ayu	29.	Pratishraba
5.	Nahusha	30.	Pratishtho
6.	Yayati	31.	Shakrajit (Shatrujit)
7.	Druhyu	32.	Pratirddan
8.	Babhru	33.	Pramath
9.	Setu	34.	Kalinda
10.	Anarta	35.	Kromo (Krath)
11.	Gandhar	36.	Mitrari
12.	Dharmma (Gharma)	37.	Baribarha
13.	Dhrita (Ghrita)	38.	Karmuk
14.	Durmad	39.	Kalang (Kalinga)
15.	Pracheta	40.	Bhishan
16.	Parachi(Shata Dharma)	41.	Bhanumitra
17.	Parabasu	42.	Chitrasen (Agha Chitrasen)
18.	Parishad	43.	Chitrarath
19.	Arijit	44.	Chitrayudh
20.	Sujit	45.	Daitya
21.	Pururoba - II	46.	Tripur Sura
22.	Bibarn	47.	Subrai (Trilochan)
23.	Puru Sen	48.	Dakshin
24.	Megh Barna	49.	Twidakshin
25.	Bikarna	50.	Sudakshin

Sl. No.	Name of King	Sl. No.	Name of King
51.	Tardakshin	76.	Muchung Fa (Harihar)
52.	Dharmataru (Dharmatar)	77.	Maichung Fa (Chandrashekhar)
53.	Dharmapal	78.	Chandraraj (Tabhuraj or Tarurai)
54.	Sadharma (Sudharma)	79.	Tarfanai (Tripaly)
55.	Tarbong	80.	Sumanta
56.	Debang	81.	Roopabanat (Shretha)
57.	Narangita	82.	Tarham (Tarhom)
58.	Dharmangad	83.	Kha Ham (Hariraj)
59.	Rukmangad	84.	Kotor Fa (Kashiraj)
60.	Somangad	85.	Kalator Fa (Madhob)
61.	Nojugrai (Nogjog)	86.	Chandra Fa (Chandraraj)
62.	Torjung	87.	Gajeshwar
63.	Tor Raj (Rajdharma)	88.	Beerraj - II
64.	Hamraj	89.	Nageshwar (Nagpati)
65.	Birraj	90.	Sikhiraj (Siksharaj)
66.	Shriraj	91.	Debraj
67.	Shriman (Shrimanta)	92.	Dhusrang (Durasha or Dhara Ishwar)
68.	Lakshmitaru	93.	Barkeerti (Birraj or Biraj)
69.	Tarlakshmi (Roopban)	94.	Sagar Fa
70.	Mailakshmi (Lakshmiban)	95.	Maloy Chandra
71.	Nageshwar	96.	Surjyarai (Surjya Narayan)
72.	Jogeshwar	97.	Achong Fanai (Indra Keerti or Uttang Fani)
73.	Ishwar Fa (Neeldhwaj)	98.	Beer Singha (Charachar)
74.	Rangkhai (Basuraj)	99.	Hachung Fa (Achang Fa or Surendra)
75.	Dhanraj Fa	100.	Bimar

Sl. No.	Name of King
101.	Kumar
102.	Sukumar
103.	Twisarao (Beerchandra or Toksarao)
104.	Rajyeshwar (Rajeshwar)
105.	Nageshwar (Misliraj or Krodheshwar)
106.	Twisong Fa (Tejong Fa)
107.	Narendra
108.	Indrakeerti
109.	Biman (Paimaraj)
110.	Yashoraj
111.	Gandhar
112.	Gangaraj (Rajganga)
113.	Sukurai (Chitrasen or Chhakru Rai)
114.	Pratit
115.	Misli (Marichi, Malsi or Marusom)
116.	Gagan (Kathuk)
117.	Keerjit (Noaraj or Nabrai)

- 118. Hamtor Fa (Jujaru Fa or Himti or Birraj), see also Twipra Era
- 119. Jangi Fa (Rajendra or Janak Fa)
- 120. Partha (Debrai or Debraj)
- 121. Sebrai
- 122. Durgur Fa (Dankuru Fa, Harirai, Kirit, Adhidharma Fa)
- 123. Kharung Fa (Kurung Fa, Ramchandra)
- 124. Sengfanai (Nrisingha, Singhafani)
- 125. Lalit Rai
- 126. Mukunda Fa (Kunda Fa)
- 127. Kamal Rai
- 128. Krishnadas
- 129. Jash Fa (Jashoraj)
- 130. Muchung Fa (Udwab)
- 131. Sadhu Rai
- 132. Pratap Rai
- 133. Vishnuprasad
- 134. Baneshwar (Baneeshwar)
- 135. Beerbahu
- 136. Samrat
- 137. Champakeshwar (Champa)
- 138. Meghraj (Megh)
- 139. Sengkwchak (Dharmadhar)
- 140. Sengthum Fa (Kirtidhar, Singhatung Fa)
- 141. Achong Fa (Rajsurjya, Kunjaham Fa)
- 142. Khichung Fa (Mohon)
- 143. Dangar Fa (Harirai)
- 144. Raja Fa

45. Dharma Manikya 146. Dhwaja Manikya 147. Dev Manikya 148. Indra Manikya 149. Vijay Manikya 150. Ananta Manikya 151. Uday Manikya 152. Jay Manikya 153. Amar Manikya 154. Rajdhar Manikya 155. Jasodhar Manikya 156. Kalyan Manikya 157. Govinda Manikya 158. Chatra Manikya 159. Ramdev Manikya 160. Ratna II 161. Narendra Manikya 162. Mahendra Manikya 163. Dharma II 164. Mukunda Manikya 165. Jay Manikya 166. Indra II 167. Vijay II 168. Krishna Manikya 169. Rajdhar Manikya 170. Ramganga Manikya 171. Durga Manikya 172. Kasicandra Manikya 173. Krishnakisor Manikya 174. Isan Manikya 175. Birchandra Manikya 176. Radhakisor Manikya 177. Birendra Kisor Manikya 178. Bir Bikram Kisor Manikya 179. Kirit Bikram Kisor Manik

=== Historical kings ===
see List of Tripuri Kings for the post-Rajmala kings.

- 145. Ratna Fa (Ratna Manikya) fl. 1280
- 146. Pratap Manikya
- 147. Mukut Manikya (Mukunda)
- 148. Maha Manikya
- 149. Dharma Manikya fl. 1430

== See also ==
- Tripura
- Tripuri people
- Tripura (princely state)
