= History of Tripura =

History of the Indian state

Kingdom of Tripura
- Part of History of Tripura
Kings of Tripura
Maha Manikya	c. 1400–1431
Dharma Manikya I	1431–1462
Ratna Manikya I	1462–1487
Pratap Manikya	1487
Vijaya Manikya I	1488
Mukut Manikya	1489
Dhanya Manikya	1490–1515
Dhwaja Manikya	1515–1520
Deva Manikya	1520–1530
Indra Manikya I	1530–1532
Vijaya Manikya II	1532–1563
Ananta Manikya	1563–1567
Udai Manikya I	1567–1573
Joy Manikya I	1573–1577
Amar Manikya	1577–1585
Rajdhar Manikya I	1586–1600
Ishwar Manikya	1600
Yashodhar Manikya	1600–1623
Interregnum	1623–1626
Kalyan Manikya	1626–1660
Govinda Manikya	1660–1661
Chhatra Manikya	1661–1667
Govinda Manikya	1661–1673
Rama Manikya	1673–1685
Ratna Manikya II	1685–1693
Narendra Manikya	1693–1695
Ratna Manikya II	1695–1712
Mahendra Manikya	1712–1714
Dharma Manikya II	1714–1725
Jagat Manikya	1725–1729
Dharma Manikya II	1729
Mukunda Manikya	1729–1739
Joy Manikya II	1739–1744
Indra Manikya II	1744–1746
Udai Manikya II	1744
Joy Manikya II	1746
Vijaya Manikya III	1746–1748
Lakshman Manikya	1740s/1750s
Interregnum	1750s–1760
Krishna Manikya	1760–1783
Rajdhar Manikya II	1785–1806
Rama Ganga Manikya	1806–1809
Durga Manikya	1809–1813
Rama Ganga Manikya	1813–1826
Kashi Chandra Manikya	1826–1829
Krishna Kishore Manikya	1829–1849
Ishan Chandra Manikya	1849–1862
Bir Chandra Manikya	1862–1896
Birendra Kishore Manikya	1909–1923
Bir Bikram Kishore Manikya	1923–1947
Kirit Bikram Kishore Manikya	1947–1949; 1949–1978 (titular)
Kirit Pradyot Manikya	1978–present (titular)

Tripura monarchy data
- Manikya dynasty (Royal family)
- Agartala (Capital of the kingdom)
- Ujjayanta Palace (Royal residence)
- Pushbanta Palace (Royal residence)
- Neermahal (Royal residence)
- Rajmala (Royal chronicle)
- Tripura Buranji (Chronicle)
- Chaturdasa Devata (Family deities)

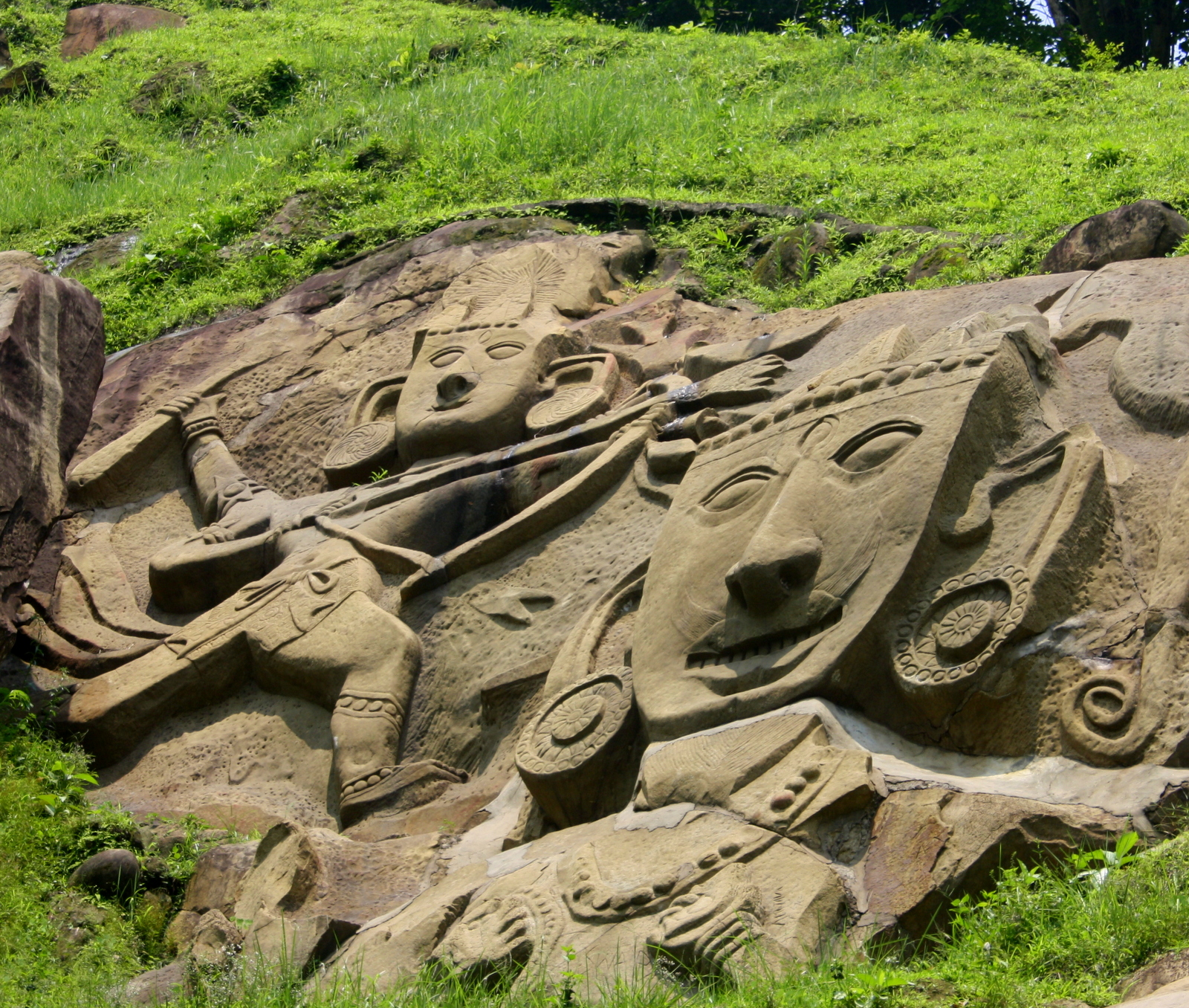
Rock reliefs at Unakoti

The State of Tripura, in northeastern India, has a long history. The Twipra Kingdom at its peak included the whole eastern region of Bengal from the Brahmaputra River in the north and west, the Bay of Bengal in the south and Burma to the east during the 14th and 15th centuries AD.

The last ruler of the princely state of Tripura was Kirit Bikram Kishore Manikya Bahadur Debbarma who reigned from 1947 to 1949 Agartala after whom the kingdom was merged with India on 9 September 1949, and the administration was taken over on 15 October 1949.

Tripura became a Union Territory on 1 November 1956, and attained the status of a full-fledged state on 21 January 1972.

== Prehistorical period ==
The origins of the kingdom are shrouded in the stories written in Rajmala, the chronicle of the Kings of Tripura, which meanders from Hindu traditional histories and Tripuri folklores.

== Ancient period ==
The ancient period can be said to be from around the 7th century when the Tripuri kings ruled from Kailashahar in North Tripura and they used "fa" as their title; "pha" in Tripuri means "father" or "head".

== Medieval period ==
The Kings of Tripura adopted the "manikya" title and shifted their capital to Udaipur (formerly Rangamati) on the banks of the River Gomti in Gomti District, Tripura in the 14th century. In this period their power and fame was even acknowledged by the Mughals, who were their contemporaries in North India.

== Modern period ==
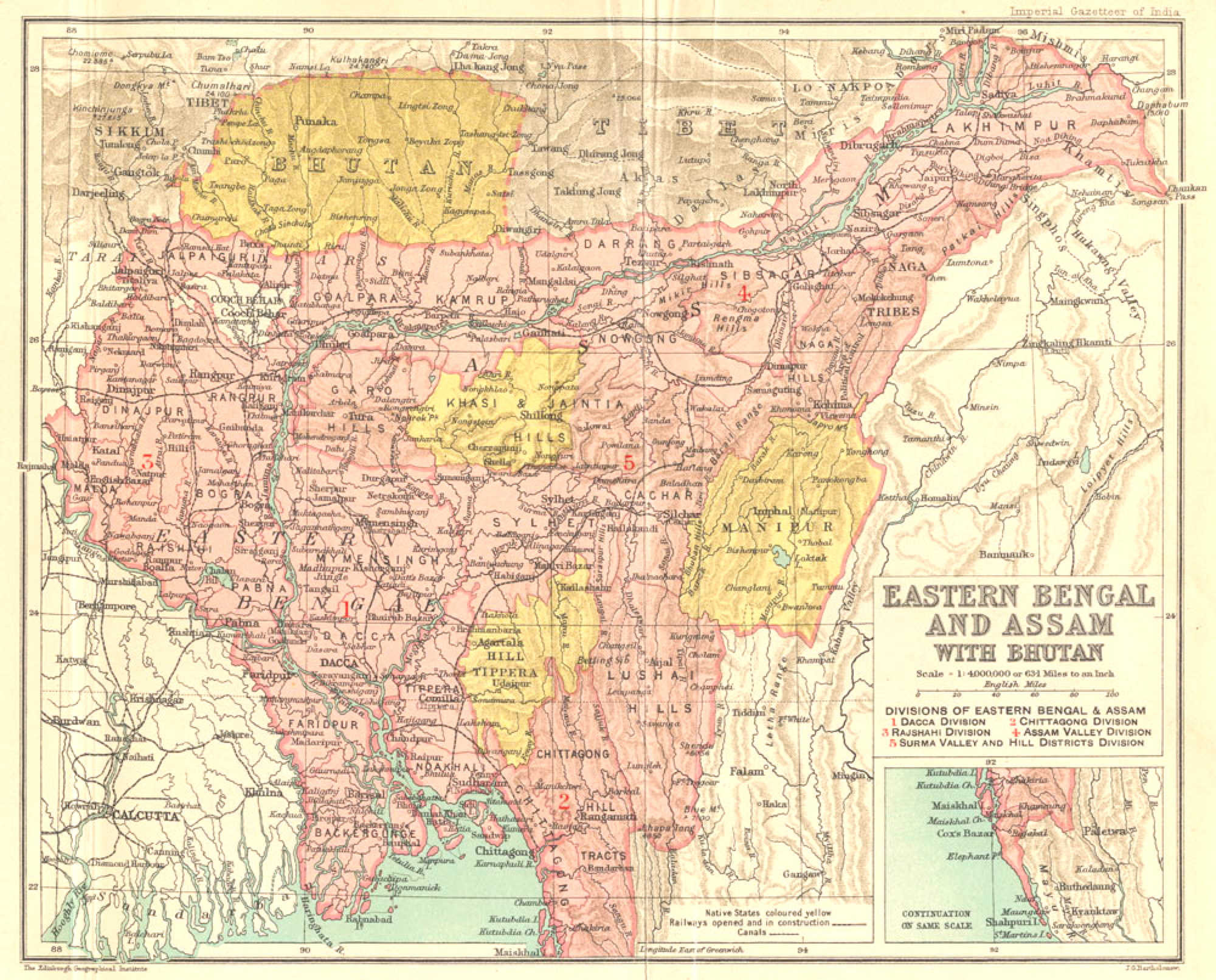
'Hill Tipperah' in the Bengal Gazetteer, 1907

The modern period starts after the domination of the kingdom by the Mughals and the further tribute to British India after the British defeated the Mughals.

=== British Colonial period (1851–1949 CE) ===
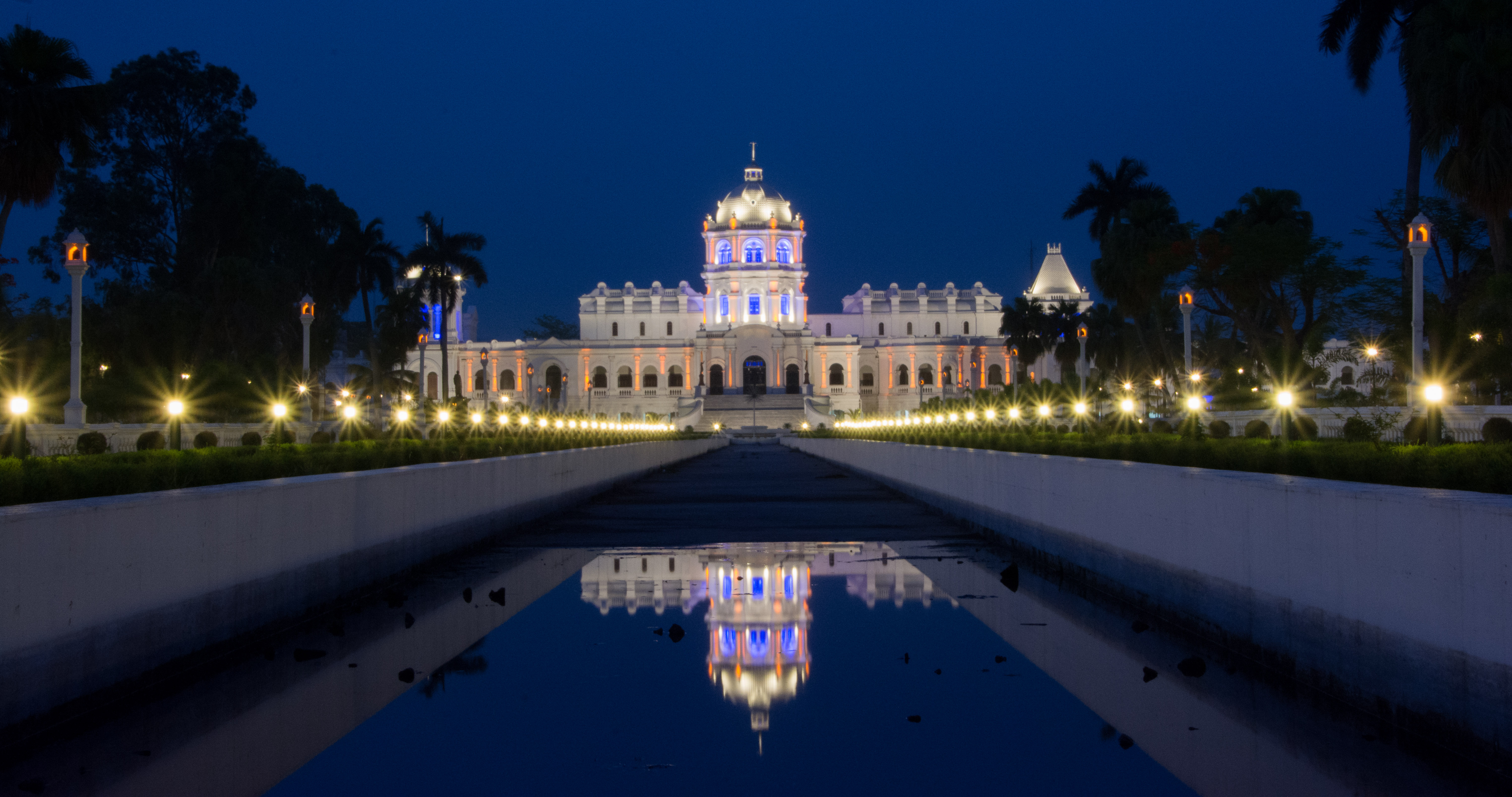
The Ujjayanta Palace was built in 1901.

In 1871, the British Indian government appointed an agent to assist the Maharaja in the administration. During this period the capital of the kingdom was shifted to Agartala, in West Tripura, the present state capital in the early part of 19th century. The rulers of Tripura built palaces including the Ujjayanta Palace and Neermahal Palace.

=== Post-Independence (1947 CE – present) ===
After India's independence, the princely state of Tripura was merged with the Union of India on 15 October 1949. Tripura became a Union Territory on 1 July 1963, and attained the status of a full-fledged state on 21 January 1972.

== See also ==
- Twipra
- Kings of Tripura
- Tripuri people
- Manikya Dynasty
- Ujjayanta Palace
- Neermahal
- Tripura (mythology)
