= Bir Bikram Kishore Manikya Bahadur =

Maharaja Colonel Bir Bikram Kishore Manikya DebBarma Bahadur GBE, KCSI
- Maharaja
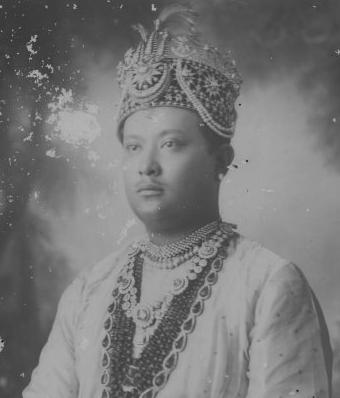
- Maharaja Bir Bikram Kishore Manikya Bahadur
- Reign: 1923–1947
- Predecessor: Birendra Kishore Manikya
- Successor: Kirit Bikram Kishore Deb Barman (with Kanchan Prava Devi as Regent) from 1947 to 1949
- Born: 19 August 1908
- Died: 17 May 1947 (aged 38)
- Spouse: Kanchan Prava Devi
- Issue: Kirit Bikram Kishore Deb Barman
Names
- Colonel Bisam-Samar-Bijojee Mahamopadhyaya Pancha-Srijukta Maharaja Sri Sri Bir Bikram Kishore Debbarma Manikya Bahadur
- Dynasty: Manikya dynasty
- Father: Maharaja Birendra Kishore Manikya Debbarma
- Mother: Maharani Arundhuti Devi
- Religion: Hinduism
- Occupation: Administrator

Bir Bikram Kishore Manikya Bahadur (19 August 1908 – 17 May 1947) was a king (or Maharaja) of Tripura State. He is known as "the architect of modern Tripura".

He was succeeded by his son, Maharaja Kirit Bikram Kishore Debbarman, who was the nominal king for two years till the state's merger into India in 1949. Since he was a minor during this time, the state was governed by a Council of Regency headed by his mother, Kanchan Prava Devi.

== Reign ==
Kingdom of Tripura
- Part of History of Tripura
Kings of Tripura
Maha Manikya	c. 1400–1431
Dharma Manikya I	1431–1462
Ratna Manikya I	1462–1487
Pratap Manikya	1487
Vijaya Manikya I	1488
Mukut Manikya	1489
Dhanya Manikya	1490–1515
Dhwaja Manikya	1515–1520
Deva Manikya	1520–1530
Indra Manikya I	1530–1532
Vijaya Manikya II	1532–1563
Ananta Manikya	1563–1567
Udai Manikya I	1567–1573
Joy Manikya I	1573–1577
Amar Manikya	1577–1585
Rajdhar Manikya I	1586–1600
Ishwar Manikya	1600
Yashodhar Manikya	1600–1623
Interregnum	1623–1626
Kalyan Manikya	1626–1660
Govinda Manikya	1660–1661
Chhatra Manikya	1661–1667
Govinda Manikya	1661–1673
Rama Manikya	1673–1685
Ratna Manikya II	1685–1693
Narendra Manikya	1693–1695
Ratna Manikya II	1695–1712
Mahendra Manikya	1712–1714
Dharma Manikya II	1714–1725
Jagat Manikya	1725–1729
Dharma Manikya II	1729
Mukunda Manikya	1729–1739
Joy Manikya II	1739–1744
Indra Manikya II	1744–1746
Udai Manikya II	1744
Joy Manikya II	1746
Vijaya Manikya III	1746–1748
Lakshman Manikya	1740s/1750s
Interregnum	1750s–1760
Krishna Manikya	1760–1783
Rajdhar Manikya II	1785–1806
Rama Ganga Manikya	1806–1809
Durga Manikya	1809–1813
Rama Ganga Manikya	1813–1826
Kashi Chandra Manikya	1826–1829
Krishna Kishore Manikya	1829–1849
Ishan Chandra Manikya	1849–1862
Bir Chandra Manikya	1862–1896
Radha Kishore Manikya	1896–1909
Birendra Kishore Manikya	1909–1923
Bir Bikram Kishore Manikya	1923–1947
Kirit Bikram Kishore Manikya	1947–1949; 1949–1978 (titular)
Kirit Pradyot Manikya	1978–present (titular)

Tripura monarchy data
- Manikya dynasty (Royal family)
- Agartala (Capital of the kingdom)
- Ujjayanta Palace (Royal residence)
- Pushbanta Palace (Royal residence)
- Neermahal (Royal residence)
- Rajmala (Royal chronicle)
- Tripura Buranji (Chronicle)
- Chaturdasa Devata (Family deities)

Bir Bikram Kishore Manikya assumed the throne in 1923, upon the death of his father.

Maharaja Bir Bikram Manikya Bahadur was popularly known as the Architect of Tripura due to his contribution to economic, social and educational institutions. He also was the first ruler of Tripura to have visited Europe and America in 1931 and 1939.

He reserved lands for the Indigenous Tiprasa people whose outcome is the TTAADC (Tripura Tribal Area Autonomous District Councils) area. Maharaja Bir Bikram College and Maharaja Bir Bikram Airport at Agartala were built by him. Maharaja Bir Bikram University is named after him.

== Titles ==
- 1909–1923: Srila-Srijukta Bir Bikram Kishore Deb Barman Jubaraj Goswami Bahadur
- 1923–1935: His Highness Bisam-Samar-Bijojee Mahamopadhyaya Radhakrishnapada Pancha-Srijukta Maharaja Sri Sri Sri Bir Bikram Kishore Deb Barman Manikya Bahadur, Maharaja of Tripura
- 1935–1937: His Highness Bisam-Samar-Bijojee Mahamopadhyaya Radhakrishnapada Pancha-Srijukta Maharaja Sri Sri Sri Sir Bir Bikram Kishore Deb Barman Manikya Bahadur, Maharaja of Tripura, KCSI
- 1937–1942: Captain His Highness Bisam-Samar-Bijojee Mahamopadhyaya Radhakrishnapada Pancha-Srijukta Maharaja Sri Sri Sri Sir Bir Bikram Kishore Deb Barman Manikya Bahadur, Maharaja of Tripura, KCSI
- 1942–1944: Major His Highness Bisam-Samar-Bijojee Mahamopadhyaya Radhakrishnapada Pancha-Srijukta Maharaja Sri Sri Sri Sir Bir Bikram Kishore Deb Barman Manikya Bahadur, Maharaja of Tripura, KCSI
- 1944–1946: Lieutenant-Colonel His Highness Bisam-Samar-Bijojee Mahamopadhyaya Radhakrishnapada Pancha-Srijukta Maharaja Sri Sri Sri Sir Bir Bikram Kishore Deb Barman Manikya Bahadur, Maharaja of Tripura, KCSI
- 1946–1947: Colonel His Highness Bisam-Samar-Bijojee Mahamopadhyaya Radhakrishnapada Pancha-Srijukta Maharaja Sri Sri Sri Sir Bir Bikram Kishore Deb Barman Manikya Bahadur, Maharaja of Tripura, GBE, KCSI

== Honours ==
(Ribbon bar, as it would look today)

- King George V Silver Jubilee Medal, 1935
- Knight Commander of the Order of the Star of India, 1935
- 1939–1945 Star – 1945
- Burma Star – 1945
- War Medal 1939–1945 – 1945
- Knight Grand Cross of the Order of the British Empire, 1946

== Sources ==
Bir Bikram Kishore Manikya Bahadur Manikya dynasty Born: 19 August 1908 Died: 17 May 1947
Preceded by Birendra Kishore Manikya	King of Tripura; 1923–1947	Succeeded by Kirit Bikram Kishore Deb Barman
