= Pradyot Bikram Manikya Deb Barma =

Indian politician (born 1978)

Pradyot Bikram Manikya Debbarma
- Pradyot Bikram Manikya in 2026

Chairperson of Tipra Motha Party
- Incumbent
- Assumed office 24 December 2019
- Preceded by: Position established
- Succeeded by: Position established

Member of District Council of Tripura Tribal Areas Autonomous District Council
- In office 19 April 2021 – 17 April 2026
- Preceded by: Ramendra Debbarma
- Succeeded by: Suraj Debbarma
- Constituency: 18- Takarjala-Jampuijala (ST)

President of Tripura Pradesh Congress Committee
- In office 26 February 2019 – 24 September 2019
- Preceded by: Birajit Sinha
- Succeeded by: Pijush Kanti Biswas

Personal details
- Born: 4 July 1978 (age 48) New Delhi, India
- Party: Tipra Motha Party (since 2021)
- Other political affiliations: Indian National Congress (until 2019)
- Parents: Kirit Bikram Kishore Deb Barman (father); Bibhu Kumari Devi (mother)
- Relatives: Bir Bikram Kishore Manikya Bahadur (grandfather); Kanchan Prava Devi (grandmother); Pragya Debbarman (sister); Kriti Devi Debbarman (sister); Jyotiraditya Scindia (cousin); Jishnu Dev Varma (uncle)
- Education: St. Edmund's College, Shillong (B.A); North-Eastern Hill University (M.A)
- Occupation: Political Activist; Businessman; Journalist; Politician; Social Activist

Pradyot Bikram Manikya Debbarma (born 4 July 1978) is the current titular king Maharaja (Bubagra) and head of the royal house of tripura, an statesman from Tripura and a veteran Indian politician. He was born in New Delhi, and now resides in Agartala, Tripura. He is the founder of TNT- The Northeast Today and he also served as the Editor-in-Chief of TNT- The Northeast Today. He is the founder and the current chairperson of The Indigenous Progressive Regional Alliance also known as TIPRA Motha Party or simply known as TMP. He is known as 'Bubagra' among his people and is one of the active voices for the rights of Indigenous Tripuri people of Tripura.

== Early life and education ==
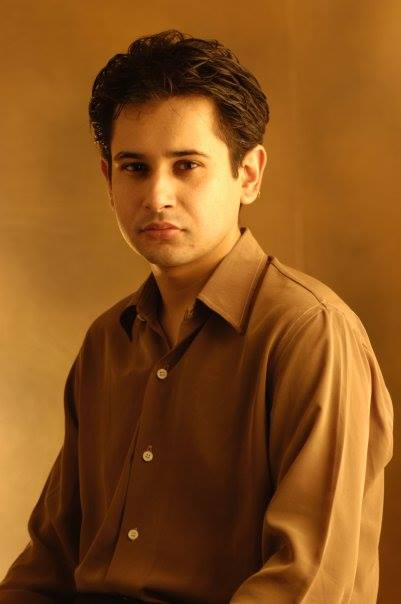

Pradyot was born in New Delhi on 4 July 1978 as the first son of Kirit Bikram Kishore Debbarma and Bhibu Kumari Devi. His childhood days were spent in Shillong, Meghalaya at the Tripura castle. He studied history at St. Edmund's College, Shillong.

== Political career ==
Pradyot Manikya's work, philanthropy, activism, and politics revolve around the socio-political, economic, and cultural development of the Indigenous people of Tripura.

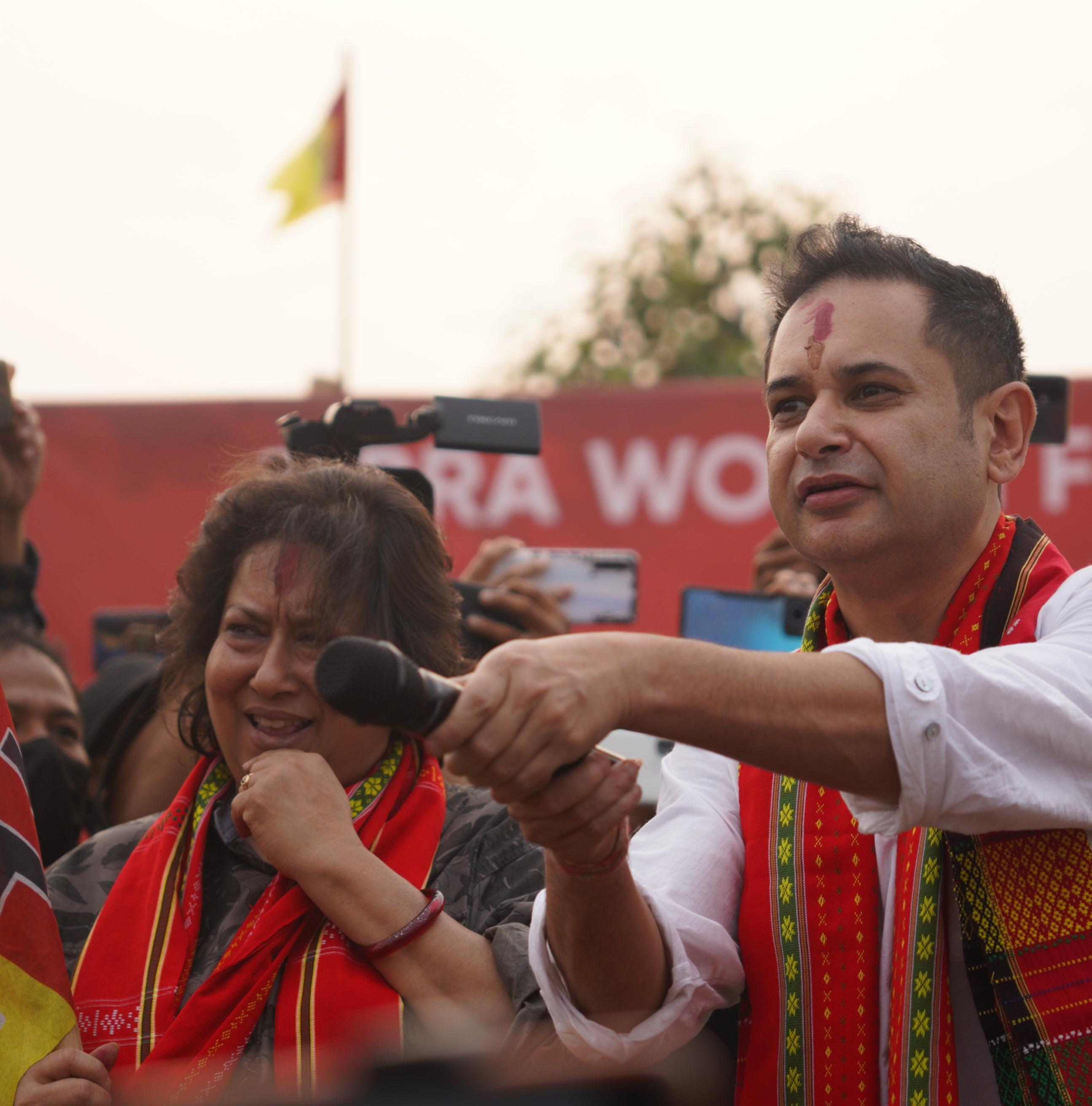
Pradyot Manikya and his sister Kriti Devi Debbarman, the Lok Sabha MP in a rally

=== Indian National Congress ===
As a youth, Pradyot Manikya was an active Indian National Congress politician. His father Kirit Bikram Debbarma was a three-time MP and his mother Bibhu Kumari Devi, a two-time Congress MLA had served as the Revenue Minister of Tripura. Although Pradyot did not contest election until the 2021 TTAADC election, he had remained active in protest, agitations and movement for the Tiprasa people of Tripura.

In the 2019 Lok Sabha election, he was an active campaigner for his sister Maharaj Kumari Pragya Debbarma who contested for the Tripura East. He had also tried to forge a regional alliance during that period which did not happen.

=== Exit from Indian National Congress: 2019 ===
After the fallout with the Tripura Pradesh Congress in 2019, Bubagra Pradyot Manikya resigned from the President post over the dispute of NRC case filing and took a break from active politics. However, he started to gain voice and support for his agitation against the Citizenship Amendment Bill, 2018 (now an act). He also jointly filed a case with TPF Supremo Patal Kanya Jamatia in the Supreme Court to revoke CAA in the state of Tripura and enforce NRC with the cut off year as 1951.

=== Tipraha Indigenous Progressive Regional Alliance (TIPRA): 2020–Present ===
Pradyot formed the then NGO Tipraha Indigenous Progressive Regional Alliance to assist stranded people during the COVID crisis. Through his effort, students and workers living in various cities of India were brought to their respective home to Tripura.

=== Tipra Motha Party ===
The Tipra Motha Party led by Pradyot came to being ahead of the 2021 TTAADC election. The party won the election with a landslide securing 18 seats out of the 28 seats. In 2023, Pradyot's Tipra Motha Party won 13 seats in Tripura Assembly Election. In the 2026 TTAADC election, Tipra Motha Party again led by Pradyot Manikya retained power by winning 24 seats out of the total 28 seats.

== Positions held ==
- Chairperson of The Indigenous Progressive Regional Alliance (TIPRA)
- Chairperson of the Club Heritage - Tripura Castle Hotel
- Current Head of The Tripura Royal Family
- Chairperson, Administrative Reforms Committee, TTAADC
- Former Member of the All India Congress Committee
- Advisor to the Northeast Students Committee, Delhi
- Advisor to the Northeast Regional Development Association (NERDA)
- Chairperson of the Royal Tripura Foundation
- Former Member of the governing council of Tripura Central University
- Former General Secretary Tripura Pradesh Congress
- Former President of Tripura Pradesh Congress

== Tiprasa Accord ==
The Tiprasa Accord was signed on March 2, 2024 as a tripartite agreement between Pradyot led Tipra Motha Party (TMP), Tripura Government, and Government of India. The agreement sought to bring about a constitutional solution safeguarding the identity, culture, language, and uplifting the socio-economic conditions of the Indigenous Tiprasa people.

== Public life, activism and opinions ==
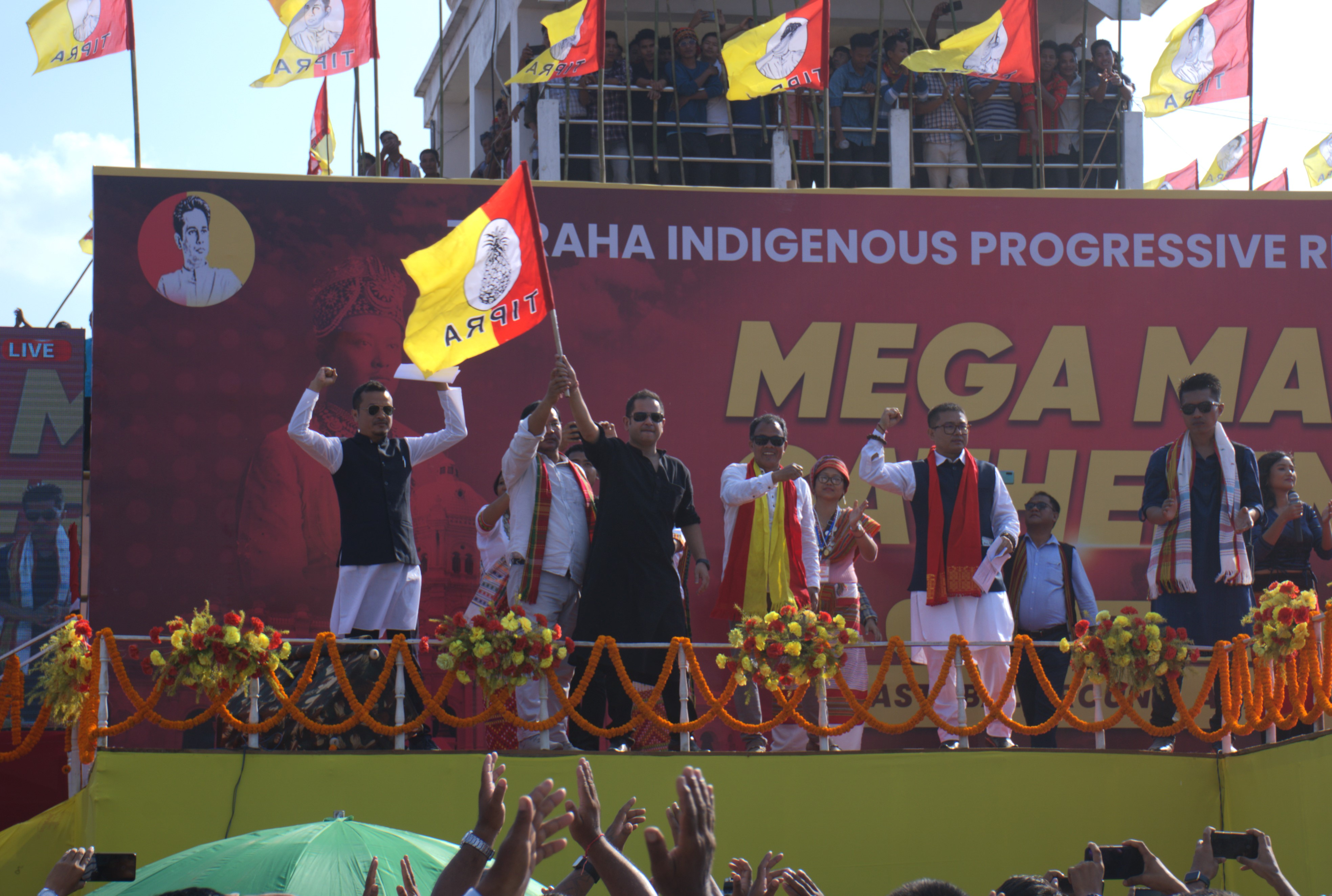
TIPRA Motha leaders addressing the mass at the 'Mega Mass Gathering', 2022

Bubagra Pradyot is quite active in his public life and can be seen having taken part on several occasions like the TEDx Talks. On 16 February 2020, he organized a Q&A interactive session with students at Townhall, Agartala where he talked and discussed about leadership, clarity and issues like Citizenship Amendment Act with the students present. He also suggested that a scholarship in the name of Maharaja Bir Bikram be started by the Government of Tripura rather than putting up a statue.

He launched The Northeast Today, a magazine targeted at residents of India's northeastern states. This enjoys a readership just shy of 1,000,000. He resigned and sold his magazine in November 2019 to concentrate on his own regional platform The Indigenous Progressive regional alliance popularly known as TIPRA. He is one of India's most vocal critics of the Armed Forces Special Powers Act (AFSPA) and is a prolific guest speaker at universities, the most notable being Harvard. He has been active in protesting against the CAA since the passing of the bill in 2019 at the parliament.

== TNT- The Northeast Today ==
Pradyot Bikram Manikya Deb Barman (P.B.K. Manikya), the royal scion of Tripura and founder of the Tipra Motha Party, also the founder of TNT- The Northeast Today magazine. He launched the publication in August 2007, TNT-The Northeast Today (TNT) is a prominent digital news portal and former magazine focused on Northeast India, providing coverage of politics, culture, and lifestyle from the region. Based in Shillong, it serves as a leading source of news for the eight northeastern states. Which has grown to become a prominent news source in Northeast India, but later resign and sold it the magazine in November 2019 to focus on his political platform. The Indigenous Progressive Regional Alliance (Tipra Motha Party) TMP.

- Founder: Pradyot Bikram Manikya Deb Barma.
- Focus Area: Offers in-depth reporting on regional politics, lifestyle, food, sports, and tourism in Northeast india.
- Platform: Primarily operates as a digital news portal (thenortheasttoday.com) with a significant, high-traffic readership.
- Origin: Launched in August 2007, it rapidly grew to become a top magazine in the region before transitioning to digital.
- Headquarters: Located in Dhankheti, Shillong, Meghalaya India.
- Content Type: Covers breaking news, special reports, culture, and exclusive stories related to the Northeast. Covering human interest stories and providing a voice for the region.
- Nature of Publication: Initially launched as a magazine, it has grown into a major digital news portal for the region.
- Audience & Reach: It has a large social media following and high monthly website traffic, focusing on delivering news relevant to the Northeast region. Known to have a massive online audience, aiming to serve the northeast region with in-depth reporting.
- Role: Pradyot Bikram Manikya Deb Barma has also been recognized as the Chairman & Editor of the publication. According to the website's the current Editor-in-Chief is Ibankyntiew Mawrie.

== Bibliography ==
- Deb Barma, Pradyot Bikram Manikya (2020), Leader with a Healing Touch: Tarun Gogoi had the ability to disagree without upsetting colleague or foe, The Indian Express
- Deb Barma, Pradyot Bikram Manikya (2020), Ambition isn't a bad word. Lack of hunger has reduced Congress to its present position, The Indian Express

== Filmography ==
=== Films ===
†	Denotes films that have not yet been released

Year	Title	Role	Notes
2021	Sandeep aur Pinky Faraar	Himself (guest appearance)	
