= List of official residences of India =

Below is a list of official residences of India.

== Union ==
Residence	Official	Location	Notes	Image
Rashtrapati Bhavan	President of India	New Delhi	Residence of the President of India	Rashtrapati Bhavan, the official residence of the President of India
Rashtrapati Niketan	President of India	Dehradun, Uttarakhand	Presidential retreat	
Rashtrapati Nilayam	President of India	Hyderabad, Telangana	Presidential retreat	Rashtrapati Nilayam, the official retreat residence of the President of India in Secunderabad, Telangana
Rashtrapati Niwas	President of India	Shimla, Himachal Pradesh	Presidential retreat	Rashtrapati Niwas, the President's retreat in Shimla, Himachal Pradesh
Vice President's Enclave	Vice President of India	New Delhi	Residence of the Vice President of India	
7, Race Course Road	Prime Minister of India	New Delhi	Residence of the Prime Minister of India	7, Race Course Road – Official residence of the Prime Minister of India
Hyderabad House	State guest house	New Delhi	Guest House of Republic of India	Hyderabad House – A state guest house used for banquets and diplomatic meetings in New Delhi

== States ==
Residence	Official	Location	Notes	Image
Lok Bhavan, Amaravati	Governor of Andhra Pradesh	Amaravati, Andhra Pradesh	Official Website	Governor Bhavanam – Official residence of the Governor of Andhra Pradesh
Lok Bhavan, Itanagar	Governor of Arunachal Pradesh	Itanagar, Arunachal Pradesh	Official Website	Vice President M. Venkaiah Naidu with staff at Lok Bhavan, Arunachal Pradesh
Lok Bhavan, Guwahati	Governor of Assam	Guwahati, Assam	Official Website	
Lok Bhavan, Patna	Governor of Bihar	Patna, Bihar	Official Website	
1, Aney Marg	Chief Minister of Bihar	Patna, Bihar	Residence of the Chief Minister of Bihar.	
Lok Bhavan, Raipur	Governor of Chhattisgarh	Raipur, Chhattisgarh	Official Website	
Lok Bhavan, Panaji	Governor of Goa	Panaji, Goa	Official Website	
Lok Bhavan, Gandhinagar	Governor of Gujarat	Gandhinagar, Gujarat	Official Website	
Lok Bhavan, Haryana	Governor of Haryana	Chandigarh	Official Website	
Lok Bhavan, Shimla	Governor of Himachal Pradesh	Shimla, Himachal Pradesh	Official Website	
Oakover	Chief Minister of Himachal Pradesh	Shimla, Himachal Pradesh	Residence of the Chief Minister of Himachal Pradesh.	
Lok Bhavan, Ranchi	Governor of Jharkhand	Ranchi, Jharkhand	Official Website	
Lok Bhavan, Bengaluru	Governor of Karnataka	Bangalore, Karnataka	Official Website	
Anugraha	Chief Minister of Karnataka	Bangalore, Karnataka	Residence of the Chief Minister of Karnataka.	
Lok Bhavan, Thiruvananthapuram	Governor of Kerala	Thiruvananthapuram, Kerala	Official Website	
Cliff House	Chief Minister of Kerala	Thiruvananthapuram, Kerala	Residence of the Chief Minister of Kerala.	
Lok Bhavan, Bhopal	Governor of Madhya Pradesh	Bhopal, Madhya Pradesh	Official Website	
Lok Bhavan, Pachmarhi	Governor of Madhya Pradesh	Panchmarhi, Madhya Pradesh	Official Website	
Lok Bhavan, Mumbai	Governor of Maharashtra	Mumbai, Maharashtra	Official Website	
Lok Bhavan, Nagpur	Governor of Maharashtra	Nagpur, Maharashtra	Official Website	
Lok Bhavan, Pune	Governor of Maharashtra	Pune, Maharashtra	Official Website	
Lok Bhavan, Mahabaleshwar	Governor of Maharashtra	Mahabaleshwar, Maharashtra	Official Website	
Varsha Bungalow	Chief Minister of Maharashtra	Mumbai, Maharashtra	Residence of the Chief Minister of Maharashtra.	
Lok Bhavan, Imphal	Governor of Manipur	Imphal, Manipur	Official Website	
Lok Bhavan, Shillong	Governor of Meghalaya	Shillong, Meghalaya	Official Website	
Lok Bhavan, Aizawl	Governor of Mizoram	Aizawl, Mizoram	Official Website	
Lok Bhavan, Kohima	Governor of Nagaland	Kohima, Nagaland	Official Website	
Lok Bhavan, Bhubaneswar	Governor of Odisha	Bhubaneswar, Odisha	Official Website	Governor Bhavan – Official residence of the Governor of Odisha
Lok Bhavan, Puri	Governor of Odisha	Puri, Odisha	Official Website	
Lok Bhavan, Punjab	Governor of Punjab	Chandigarh	Official Website	
Lok Bhavan, Jaipur	Governor of Rajasthan	Jaipur, Rajasthan	Official Website	
Lok Bhavan, Gangtok	Governor of Sikkim	Gangtok, Sikkim	Official Website	
Lok Bhavan, Chennai	Governor of Tamil Nadu	Chennai, Tamil Nadu	Official Website	
Lok Bhavan, Ooty	Governor of Tamil Nadu	Ooty, Tamil Nadu	Official Website	
Lok Bhavan, Hyderabad	Governor of Telangana	Hyderabad, Telangana	Official Website	
Praja Bhavan	Chief Minister of Telangana	Hyderabad, Telangana	Residence of the Chief Minister of Telangana.	
Lok Bhavan, Agartala	Governor of Tripura	Agartala, Tripura	Official Website	
Jan Bhavan, Lucknow	Governor of Uttar Pradesh	Lucknow, Uttar Pradesh	Official Website	
5, Kalidas Marg	Chief Minister of Uttar Pradesh	Lucknow, Uttar Pradesh	Residence of the Chief Minister of Uttar Pradesh.	
Lok Bhavan, Dehradun	Governor of Uttarakhand	Dehradun, Uttarakhand	Official Website	
Lok Bhavan, Nainital	Governor of Uttarakhand	Nainital, Uttarakhand	Official Website	
Lok Bhavan, Kolkata	Governor of West Bengal	Kolkata, West Bengal	Official Website	
Lok Bhavan, Darjeeling	Governor of West Bengal	Darjeeling, West Bengal	Official Website	

== Union territories ==
Residence	Official	Location	Website	Image
Lok Niwas, Port Blair	Lieutenant Governor of the Andaman and Nicobar Islands	Port Blair, Andaman and Nicobar Islands	Official Website	
Lok Bhavan, Jammu	Lieutenant Governor of Jammu and Kashmir	Jammu, Jammu and Kashmir	Official Website	
Lok Bhavan, Srinagar	Lieutenant Governor of Jammu and Kashmir	Srinagar, Jammu and Kashmir	Official Website	
Lok Niwas, Leh	Lieutenant Governor of Ladakh	Leh, Ladakh	Official Website	
Lok Niwas, Delhi	Lieutenant Governor of Delhi	Delhi	Official Website	Raj Niwas, Delhi — the official residence of the Lieutenant Governor of Delhi.
Lok Niwas, Pondicherry	Lieutenant Governor of Puducherry	Puducherry	Official Website	

== See also ==
- Lok Bhavan
- Raj Niwas
