= Lok Bhavan =

Indian state governor official residence

Lok Bhavan (Jan Bhavan only in Uttar Pradesh), formerly Raj Bhavan (lit. 'Government House'), the official residence and office of the governor of an Indian state, serving as the constitutional head of that state and exercising powers as defined in the Constitution of India.

== List of Lok Bhavan ==
State	Lok Bhavan	Location	Ref.
Andhra Pradesh	Lok Bhavan, Amaravati	Vijayawada	
Arunachal Pradesh	Lok Bhavan, Itanagar	Itanagar	
Assam	Lok Bhavan, Guwahati	Guwahati	
Bihar	Lok Bhavan, Patna	Patna	
Chhattisgarh	Lok Bhavan, Raipur	Raipur	
Goa	Lok Bhavan, Panaji	Panaji	
Gujarat	Lok Bhavan, Gandhinagar	Gandhinagar	
Haryana	Lok Bhavan, Haryana	Chandigarh	
Himachal Pradesh	Lok Bhavan, Shimla	Shimla	
Jammu and Kashmir	Lok Bhavan, Jammu	Jammu	
Jammu and Kashmir	Lok Bhavan, Srinagar	Srinagar	
Jharkhand	Lok Bhavan, Ranchi	Ranchi	
Jharkhand	Lok Bhavan, Dumka	Dumka	
Karnataka	Lok Bhavan, Bengaluru	Bengaluru	
Kerala	Lok Bhavan, Thiruvananthapuram	Thiruvananthapuram	
Madhya Pradesh	Lok Bhavan, Bhopal	Bhopal	
Madhya Pradesh	Lok Bhavan, Pachmarhi	Pachmarhi	
Maharashtra	Lok Bhavan, Mumbai	Mumbai	
Maharashtra	Lok Bhavan, Nagpur	Nagpur	
Maharashtra	Lok Bhavan, Pune	Pune	
Maharashtra	Lok Bhavan, Mahabaleshwar	Mahabaleshwar	
Manipur	Lok Bhavan, Imphal	Imphal	
Meghalaya	Lok Bhavan, Shillong	Shillong	
Mizoram	Lok Bhavan, Aizawl	Aizawl	
Nagaland	Lok Bhavan, Kohima	Kohima	
Odisha	Lok Bhavan, Bhubaneswar	Bhubaneswar	
Odisha	Lok Bhavan, Puri	Puri	
Punjab	Lok Bhavan, Punjab	Chandigarh	
Rajasthan	Lok Bhavan, Jaipur	Jaipur	
Sikkim	Lok Bhavan, Gangtok	Gangtok	
Tamil Nadu	Lok Bhavan, Chennai	Chennai	
Tamil Nadu	Lok Bhavan, Udhagamandalam	Ooty	
Telangana	Lok Bhavan, Hyderabad	Hyderabad	
Tripura	Lok Bhavan, Agartala	Agartala	
Uttar Pradesh	Jan Bhavan, Lucknow	Lucknow	
Uttarakhand	Lok Bhavan, Dehradun	Dehradun	
Uttarakhand	Lok Bhavan, Nainital	Nainital	
West Bengal	Lok Bhavan, Kolkata	Kolkata	
West Bengal	Lok Bhavan, Darjeeling	Darjeeling	

== See also ==
- Lok Niwas
- Rashtrapati Bhavan
- Rashtrapati Niketan
- Rashtrapati Nilayam
- Rashtrapati Niwas
- Vice President's Enclave
