= Lok Niwas =

Palace of the Governors of Union Territories in India

Lok Niwas (Hindi for "Peoples's Residence"), is the common name of the official residences of the Lieutenant Governors of Union territories of India and may refer to:

== List of Lok Niwas ==
Union Territory	Raj Niwas	Location	Photo	Website
Andaman and Nicobar Islands	Lok Niwas, Port Blair	Port Blair		Official Website
Delhi	Lok Niwas, Delhi	Delhi		Official Website
Ladakh	Lok Niwas, Leh	Leh		Official Website
Puducherry	Lok Niwas, Pondicherry	Puducherry		Official Website

== See also ==
- Lok Bhavan
- Rashtrapati Ashiana
- Rashtrapati Bhavan
- Rashtrapati Nilayam
- Rashtrapati Niwas, Mashobra
- Vice President's Enclave
