= Lok Bhavan, Jammu and Kashmir =

Lok Bhavan, Jammu and Kashmir may refer to:

- Lok Bhavan, Jammu, official winter residence of the governor of Jammu and Kashmir, located in Jammu.
- Lok Bhavan, Srinagar, official summer residence of the governor of Jammu and Kashmir, located in Srinagar.
