= Lok Bhavan, Uttarakhand =

Lok Bhavan, Uttarakhand may refer to:

- Lok Bhavan, Dehradun, official winter residence of the governor of Uttarakhand, located in Dehradun.
- Lok Bhavan, Nainital, official summer residence of the governor of Uttarakhand, located in Nainital.
