= Pushbanta Palace =

Coordinates: 23.853524°N 91.284766°E

Pushpabanta Palace
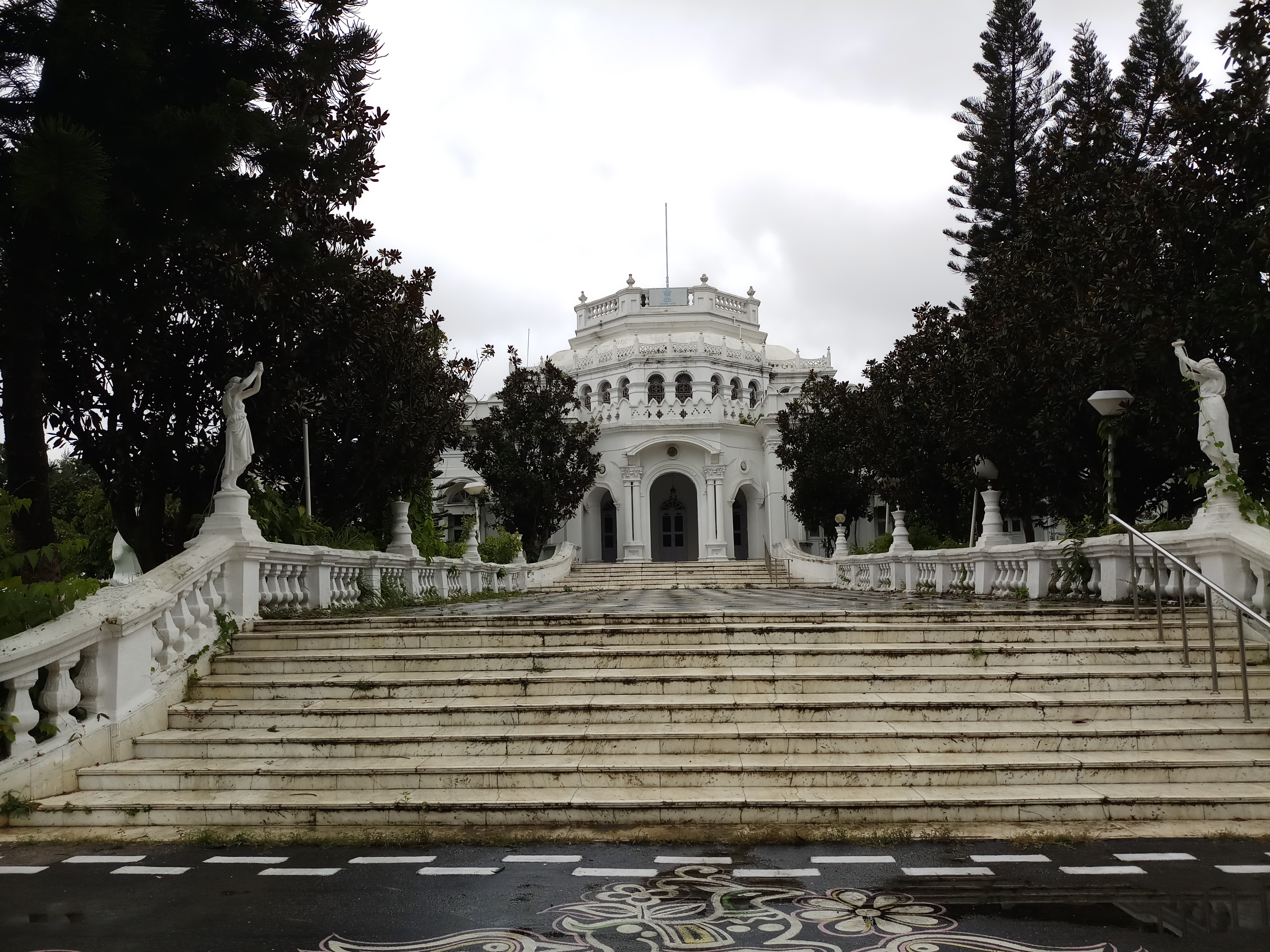
- Interactive map of the Pushpabanta Palace area
- Alternative names: Kunjaban Palace
- Etymology: Literal meaning, Flowerful Palace

General information
- Type: Historical Place
- Architectural style: Indo-Saracenic Revival
- Classification: Cultural Museum
- Location: Agartala, India
- Opened: 1917; 109 years ago
- Owner: Government of Tripura

Technical details
- Grounds: 1.76 hectares

Design and construction
- Developer: Birendra Kishore Manikya Debbarman Bahadur
- Known for: Raj Bhavan till 2018, and a proposed museum

The Pushpabanta Palace also known as Kunjaban Palace is one of former royal palace of Tripura, it was built by Maharaja Birendra Kishore Manikya in 1917. It was the Raj Bhavan of Tripura till 2018, which later shifted to another place. The palace is being developed as a national-level cultural museum.

== History ==
Pushpabanta Palace, the former Raj Bhavan of Tripura. It was built by Maharaja Birendra Kishore Manikya Debbarman Bahadur (1909-1923). He selected a spot on a green hillock known as Kunjaban, which stands at a distance of 1 km north of Ujjayanta palace. The palace was constructed in 1917. It was named as Pushpabanta Palace and it covers a total area of 1.76 hectares.

It also doubled up as a guest house for the Manikya kings. Nobel laureate Rabindranath Tagore, who had close ties with the royal family, visited Tripura seven times. During his last visit to the state in 1926, Tagore stayed at the Pushpabanta Palace. Tagore's 80th birthday was celebrated in this by Maharaja Bir Bikram Kishore Manikya during a programme in May 1941.

After the princely state merged with the Indian union in 1949, the 4.31-acre palace was converted into the chief commissioner's bungalow and then the Raj Bhavan till 2018. The Raj Bhavan was finally shifted to a new building in 2018. The southern side of the park has been made open to the public and has been named as Rabindra Kanan.

== The New Museum ==
Droupadi Murmu, the President of India, laid the foundation-stone of the digital museum at the former royal palace, the Pushpabanta Palace, on 14 October 2022. The Tripura government has sanctioned the budget for this ongoing project to boost tourism in the state.

== See also ==
- Government Houses of the British Indian Empire
