= List of governors of Uttarakhand =

Head of state

Governor of Uttarakhand
- Emblem of Uttarakhand

- Flag of India

- Incumbent; Dhal Singh Bisen since 19 October 2026
- Government of Uttarakhand
- Style: His Excellency (within Uttarakhand); The Honourable (outside Uttarakhand)
- Status: Head of state
- Residence: Lok Bhavan, Dehradun; Lok Bhavan, Nainital (summer residence); Lok Bhavan, Dehradun (winter)
- Nominator: Union Government of India
- Appointer: President of India
- Term length: At the pleasure of the president
- Inaugural holder: Surjit Singh Barnala (2000–2003)
- Formation: 9 November 2000; 25 years ago
- Website: Governor of Uttarakhand

The governor of Uttarakhand is the nominal head of the Indian state of Uttarakhand. Appointed by the president of India, the governor holds office at the president's pleasure. The governor is de jure head of the state government; all its executive actions are taken in the governor's name. However, the governor must act on the advice of the popularly elected Uttarakhand Council of Ministers, headed by the chief minister of Uttarakhand, who thus hold de facto executive authority at the state-level. The Constitution of India also empowers the governor to act upon his or her own discretion, such as the ability to appoint or dismiss a ministry, recommend President's rule, or reserve bills for the president's assent. The governor of Uttarakhand has their official residences at the Raj Bhavans in Dehradun and Nainital.

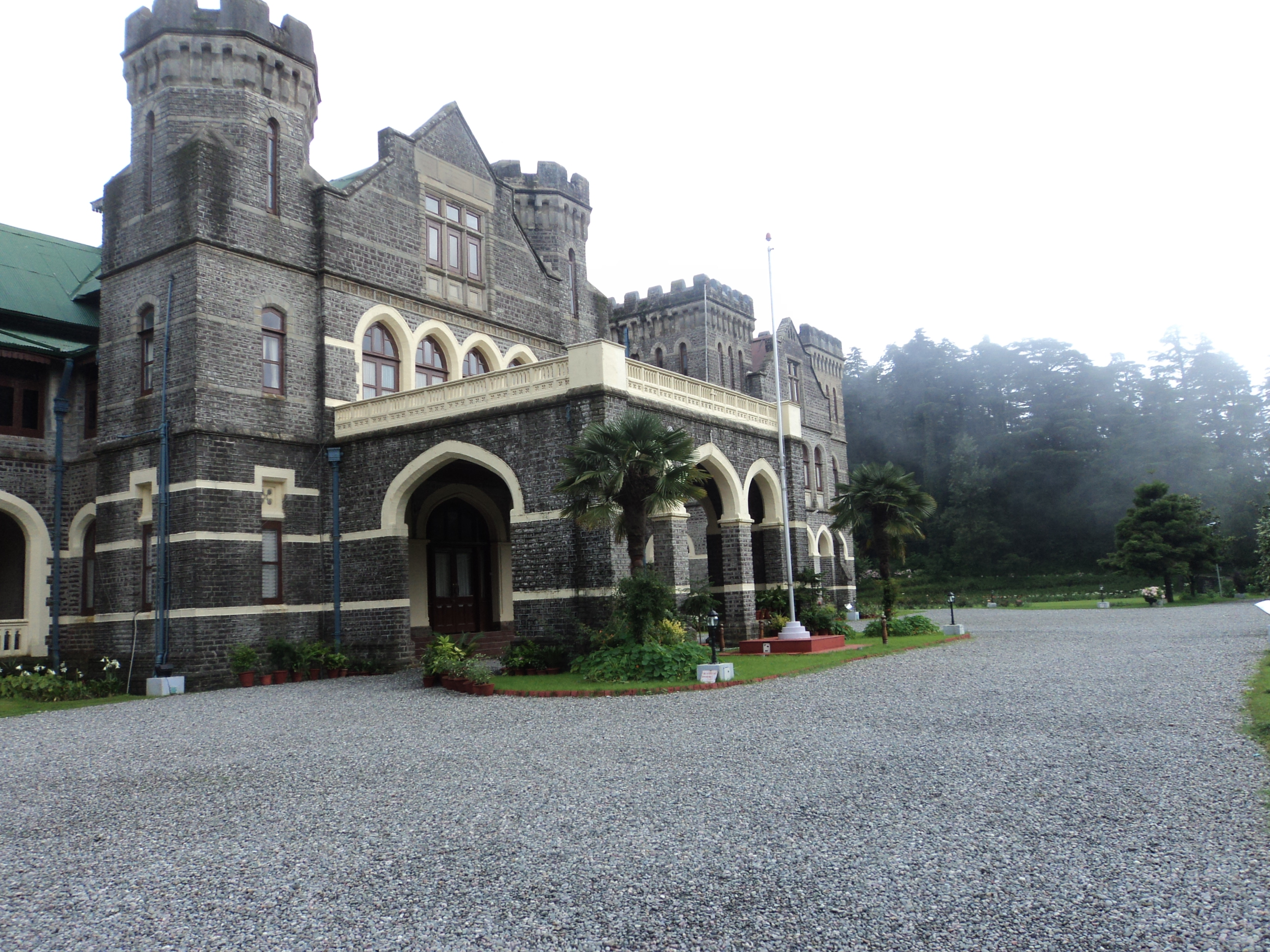
Raj Bhavan retreat at Nainital, Uttarakhand.

Uttarakhand was created on 9 November 2000, when it was carved out from the Himalayan districts of Uttar Pradesh. The first governor of the state was Surjit Singh Barnala who served in office between 2000 and 2003. The current governor is Dhal Singh Bisen who has been in office since 19 October 2026. As of date, eight individuals have served as the governor of the state including two women - Margaret Alva and Baby Rani Maurya. Only Gurmit Singh has till date completed full term in office. He is also the longest serving governor of the state.

== Qualifications ==
Article 157 and Article 158 of the Constitution of India specify eligibility requirements for the post of governor. They are as follows:

A governor must:

- be a citizen of India.
- be at least 35 years of age.
- not be a member of either house of the parliament or house of the state legislature.
- not hold any office of profit.

== Powers and functions ==
The governor enjoys many different types of powers:

- Executive powers related to administration, appointments and removals,
- Legislative powers related to lawmaking and the state legislature, that is Vidhan Sabha (legislative assembly) & vidhan parishad, and
- Discretionary powers to be carried out according to the discretion of the governor.

Apart from enjoying various constitutional powers, the governor of Uttarakhand is the ex-officio Chancellor of the twelve state universities of Uttarakhand. The universities include Doon University, G. B. Pant University of Agriculture and Technology, Hemwati Nandan Bahuguna Uttarakhand Medical Education University, Kumaun University, Soban Singh Jeena University, Sri Dev Suman Uttarakhand University, Uttarakhand Ayurved University, Uttarakhand Open University, Uttarakhand Residential University, Uttarakhand Sanskrit University, Uttarakhand Technical University, and Veer Chandra Singh Garhwali Uttarakhand University of Horticulture and Forestry

== List of governors of Uttarakhand ==
Legend

- ^{†} Died in office
- ^{§} Transferred
- ^{‡} Resigned/removed

Color key

- indicates acting/additional charge

#	Portrait	Name (born–died)	Home state	Tenure in office			Appointer (President)
#	Portrait	Name (born–died)	Home state	From	To	Time in office	Appointer (President)
1		Surjit Singh Barnala (1925–2017)	Punjab	9 November 2000	7 January 2003^{[§]} (Note: Transferred as the Governor of Andhra Pradesh)	2 years, 59 days	K. R. Narayanan
2		Sudarshan Agarwal; IAS (Retd.) (1931–2019)	Punjab	8 January 2003	28 October 2007^{[§]} (Note: Transferred as the Governor of Sikkim)	4 years, 293 days	A. P. J. Abdul Kalam
3		Banwari Lal Joshi; IPS (Retd.) (1936–2017)	Rajasthan	29 October 2007	5 August 2009^{[§]} (Note: Transferred as the Governor of Uttar Pradesh)	1 year, 280 days	Pratibha Patil
4		Margaret Alva (born 1942)	Karnataka	6 August 2009	14 May 2012^{[§]} (Note: Transferred as the Governor of Rajasthan)	2 years, 282 days	Pratibha Patil
5		Aziz Qureshi (1941–2024)	Madhya Pradesh	15 May 2012	7 January 2015^{[§]} (Note: Transferred as the Governor of Mizoram)	2 years, 237 days	Pratibha Patil
6		Krishan Kant Paul; IPS (Retd.) (born 1948)	Chandigarh	8 January 2015	25 August 2018	3 years, 229 days	Pranab Mukherjee
7		Baby Rani Maurya (born 1956)	Uttar Pradesh	26 August 2018	8 September 2021^{[‡]}	3 years, 19 days	Ram Nath Kovind
8		Lieutenant General; Gurmit Singh (Retd.); PVSM UYSM AVSM VSM (born 1956)	Punjab	15 September 2021	19 October 2026	5 years, 34 days	Ram Nath Kovind
9		Dhal Singh Bisen (born 1952)	Madhya Pradesh	19 October 2026	Incumbent	0 days	Droupadi Murmu

== Oath ==
“I, <name>, do swear in the name of God/solemly affirm that I will faithfully execute the office of Governor (or discharge the functions of the Governor) of Uttarakhand and will to the best of my ability preserve, protect and defend the Constitution and the law and that I will devote myself to the service and well-being of the people of Uttarakhand.

== See also ==
- Government of Uttarakhand
- Chief Minister of Uttarakhand
- Uttarakhand Legislative Assembly
- Speaker of the Uttarakhand Legislative Assembly
- Leader of the Opposition in the Uttarakhand Legislative Assembly
- Cabinet of Uttarakhand
- Chief Justice of Uttarakhand
- List of current Indian governors
- List of presidents of India
