= Kalidas Marg =

Road in Lucknow, India

Route information
- Length: 1.4 km (0.87 mi)

Major junctions
- North-West end: Golf Course Chauraha
- South-East end: Vikramaditya Marg

Location
- Country: India

Highway system
- Roads in India; Expressways; National; State; Asian

Kalidas Marg is a road located in Lucknow, Uttar Pradesh in India. The road is 1.4 kilometres (0.87 mi) in length, it starts at Golf Course Chauraha and ends on Vikramaditya Marg.

This road is home to official residence of the Chief Minister of Uttar Pradesh, 5, Kalidas Marg.

== School ==
- La Martiniere Lucknow Junior Section
