= Gurmit Singh (general) =

Formar Governor of Uttarakhand and Retired Lieutenant General, Indian Army (born 1956)

Lieutenant General (Retd.) Gurmit Singh PVSM, UYSM, AVSM, VSM
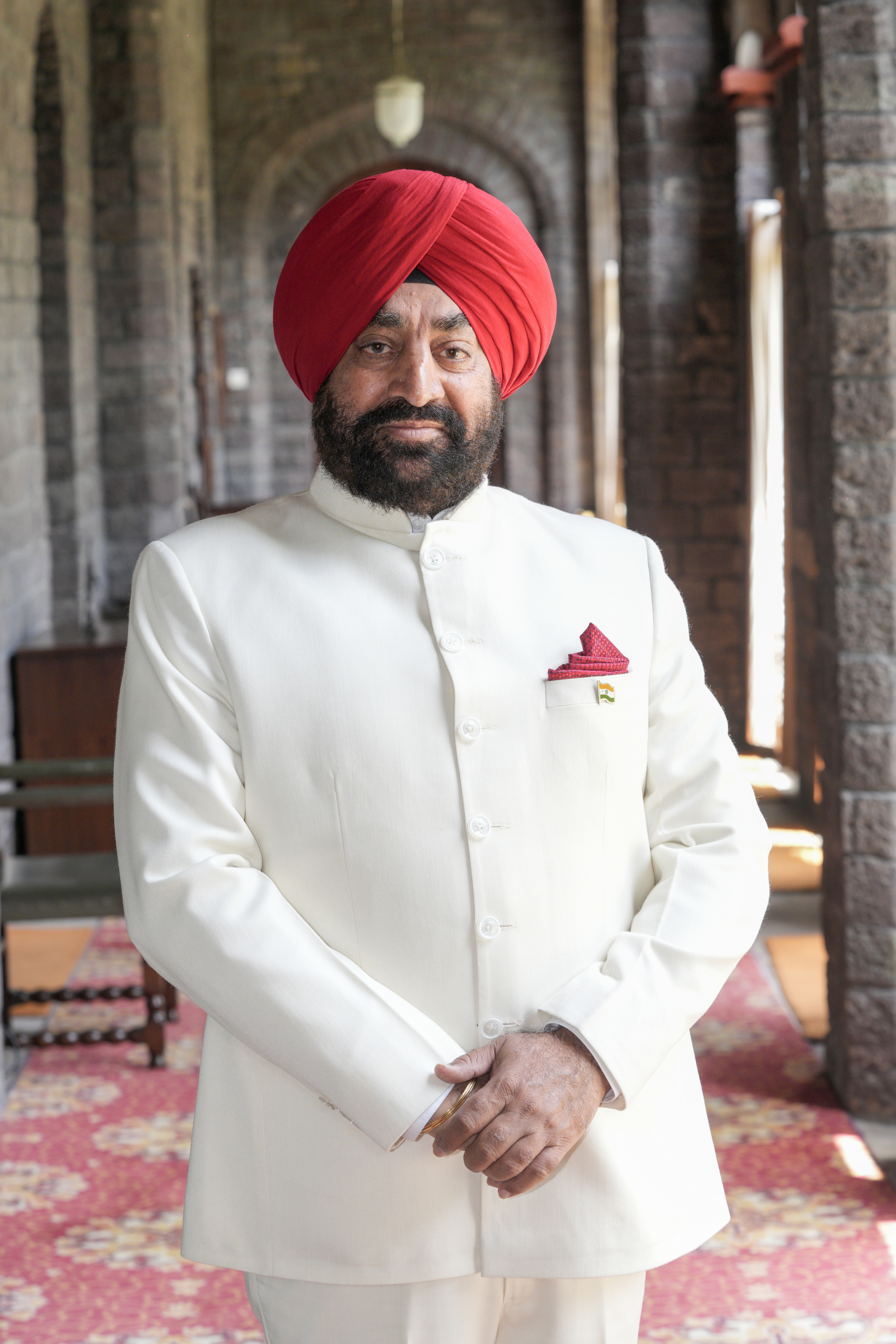
- Official portrait, 2020

Governor of Uttarakhand
- In office 15 September 2021 – 19 October 2026
- Chief Minister: Pushkar Singh Dhami
- Preceded by: Baby Rani Maurya
- Succeeded by: Dhal Singh Bisen

Deputy Chief of the Army Staff (Information Systems and Training)
- In office October 2014 – January 2016
- Preceded by: Jai Prakash Nehra (PVSM, AVSM**)
- Succeeded by: Jagbir Singh Cheema (PVSM, AVSM, VSM)

Personal details
- Born: 1 February 1956 (age 70) Amritsar, Punjab, India
- Party: Bharatiya Janta Party
- Awards: Param Vishisht Seva Medal; Uttam Yudh Seva Medal; Ati Vishisht Seva Medal; Vishisht Seva Medal
- Website: governoruk.gov.in

Military service
- Allegiance: India
- Branch/service: Indian Army
- Years of service: 1976–2016
- Rank: Lieutenant General
- Commands: XV Corps; Deputy Chief of Army Staff (IS&T)

Lieutenant General Gurmit Singh PVSM, UYSM, AVSM, VSM (born 1 February 1956) is a retired Indian Army officer who was the Deputy Chief Staff of the Indian Army from 2014 to 2016. Singh is serving as the Governor of Uttarakhand since 15 September 2021. He has also worked in border issues and counter-terrorism.

== Life and career ==
=== Personal life and education ===
Singh was born on 1 February 1956 in Jalal Usman, Amritsar, Punjab. His father served in the Indian Army and his elder brother served in Indian Air Force.

He graduated from the Defence Services Staff Course and National Defence College, has two M.Phil degrees from Chennai and Indore universities, and was a research fellow for two years on the India-China Boundary issue at the Institute of Chinese Studies, Jawaharlal Nehru University during his study leave from the Indian Army.

=== Military career ===
After serving as an Infantry Company Commander and Brigade Commander, he was appointed a Brigadier General of Army Staff. He later achieved the rank of Major General and served as the Additional Director General of Military Operations and Deputy Chief of Army Staff. During his stint in the Army, he was a part of numerous expert groups, joint working groups, annual dialogues and China study group meetings for over a decade. He also served in Banbasa, Uttarakhand, while in the army.

=== Honours ===
Singh received four Presidential Awards and two commendations by the Chief of Army Staff while in the Army. He has also received the Param Vishisht Seva Medal, Uttam Yudh Seva Medal, Ati Vishisht Seva Medal and Vishisht Seva Medal.

Param Vishisht Seva Medal
Uttam Yudh Seva Medal	Ati Vishisht Seva Medal	Vishisht Seva Medal

=== Governorship ===
On 9 September 2021, he was appointed Uttarakhand's Governor by the Indian government, replacing then governor Baby Rani Maurya, who had resigned two years before her tenure was scheduled to end. He became the state's eighth and current governor. He took oath as the governor of Uttarakhand on 15 September 2021 at a ceremony held in Raj Bhavan.

Government offices
Preceded by Baby Rani Maurya	Governor of Uttarakhand; 9 September 2021 – Present	Succeeded by Incumbent
Military offices
Preceded by Om Prakash	General Officer Commanding XV Corps; 10 June 2013 – 25 June 2014	Succeeded by Subrata Saha
Preceded by Jai Prakash Nehra	Deputy Chief of Army Staff (Information Systems and Strategy); October 2014 – January 2016	Succeeded by Jagbir Singh Cheema
