= Baby Rani Maurya =

Indian politician

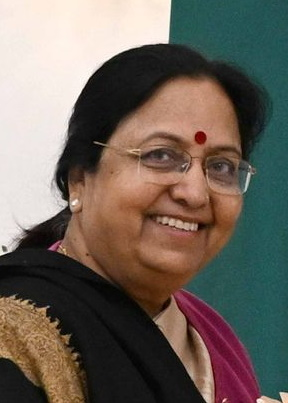

Cabinet Minister Government of Uttar Pradesh
- Incumbent
- Assumed office March 2022
- Chief Minister: Yogi Adityanath
- Ministry & Departments: Women Welfare; Child Development & Nutrition

Member of the Uttar Pradesh Legislative Assembly
- Incumbent
- Assumed office 10 March 2022
- Preceded by: Hemlata Divakar
- Constituency: Agra Rural

7th Governor of Uttarakhand
- In office 26 August 2018 – 15 September 2021
- Chief Minister: Trivendra Singh Rawat; Tirath Singh Rawat; Pushkar Singh Dhami
- Preceded by: Krishan Kant Paul
- Succeeded by: Lt. Gen. Gurmit Singh (Retd.)

Member of the National Commission for Women
- In office 2002–2005

Mayor of Agra
- In office 1995–2000

Personal details
- Born: 15 August 1956 (age 70)
- Party: Bharatiya Janata Party
- Spouse: Pradeep Kumar Maurya

Baby Rani Maurya (born 15 August 1956) is an Indian politician, currently serving as a minister in the Government of Uttar Pradesh since March 2022. She served as seventh governor of Uttarakhand from 26 August 2018 till 15 September 2021.

== Early life ==
Maurya was born on 15 August 1956 in Jatav Caste which is also known as Ravidasia. She has Bachelor of Education and Master of Arts degrees.

== Career ==
Maurya became active in politics in the early 1990s, following her marriage to a bank officer, Pradeep Kumar Maurya, who now serves on the advisory board of the Punjab National Bank after retiring as its director. She began her political career as a worker of the Bharatiya Janata Party (BJP). In 1995 she contested the Agra mayoral election on a BJP ticket, and won with a large mandate. She was the first woman to be mayor of Agra, and held the post until 2000.

In 1997, Maurya was appointed an office bearer of the scheduled caste (SC) wing of the BJP. Ram Nath Kovind, who late became the President of India, was then the chairman of the SC wing. As office bearer of this wing she assumed responsibility for strengthening the BJP's reach among members of the scheduled castes in Uttar Pradesh. In 2001, she was made a member of the Uttar Pradesh social welfare board. In recognition of her efforts toward the empowerment of dalit women, in 2002 she was made a member of the National Commission for Women. She served on the commission until 2005.

The BJP nominated Maurya to contest the Etmadpur seat in the 2007 Uttar Pradesh Legislative Assembly election; however, she narrowly lost to her Bahujan Samaj Party opponent, Narayan Singh Suman. From 2013 to 2015, she was engaged in the state-level responsibilities that were assigned to her by the BJP. In July 2018, she was made a member of the State Commission for Protection of Child Rights.

On 21 August 2018, Maurya was appointed the seventh governor of Uttarakhand by the Indian government. She was sworn in on 26 August at a ceremony held at the Raj Bhavan in Uttarakhand, becoming only the second woman to be the governor of Uttarakhand: Margaret Alva, appointed in 2009, was the first. She succeeded Krishan Kant Paul, whose term had officially expired on 8 July, but who remained in office until 25 August due to the delay in appointing his replacement. She resigned in September 2021, two years before completing her term as governor. A few days later, she was appointed National Vice President of BJP, with assembly elections in her home state of UP due in a few months. She was elected to Uttar Pradesh Legislative Assembly in 2022 election from Agra Rural constituency. She was appointed minister in the second Yogi Adityanath government in March 2022.

Political offices
Preceded by Krishan Kant Paul	Governor of Uttarakhand; 26 August 2018–15 September 2021	Succeeded by Lt. Gen. Gurmit Singh (Retd.)
