= Maharaja Birendra Kishore Museum =

- Former name: Raj bhavan of Tripura
- Location: Pushbanta Palace
- Type: Cultural museum
- Collections: Fine arts Contemporary photography
- Owner: Government of Tripura

Maharaja Birendra Kishore Manikya Museum, is a proposed digital museum and being developed as a national-level cultural centre, at the Pushbanta Palace in Agartala, capital of Tripura, India.

== Proposal ==
The foundation stone for the digital museum at Pushbanta Palace was laid by Draupadi Murmu, the President of India, on October 14, 2022. It is estimated that about 400,000,000 rupees have been sanctioned for the development of the heritage structure as a digital museum. A display of the heritage of the North Eastern States, fine arts of South East Asia, and contemporary photography, as well as the national and international archives, are planned.
