= Vikrama Simhapuri University =

University in Andhra Pradesh, India

- Motto: Satyam Gnanamanantham
- Type: Public
- Established: 2008
- Affiliations: UGC
- Chancellor: Governor of Andhra Pradesh
- Vice-Chancellor: Allam Srinivasa Rao
- Location: Nellore, Andhra Pradesh, India
- Campus: Kakuturu
- Nickname: VSU
- Website: www.vsu.ac.in

Vikrama Simhapuri University (VSU) is a public state university in the Nellore district of the Indian state of Andhra Pradesh. It was established in 2008. It offers 17 post-graduate courses. It was located at Kakuturu Village for the distance of 13 Kilometers from the District Headquarters.

== Campus ==
VSU does not have its own buildings. It started with an administrative building at Dargamitta, Nellore. Regular classes are at V.R. High School Campus (Old Law College Campus), Nellore. Then after shifting to its own buildings, the administratitive building was named Potti Sriramulu Block. The Abdul kalam building held the classrooms, and boys and girls hostels at Kakutur Nellore.

Campus construction is in process at Kakutur, Nellore on 87 acres (350,000 m^{2}) provided by the government of Andhra Pradesh.

== Academics ==
VSU is an undergraduate and post-graduate university. VSU conducts its own entrance examinations — VSURESET and VSUPGCET — each year. Courses include:B.A, B.Com., B.Sc., B.B.A, B.C.A, B.B.O.L, L.L.B, B.Tech. and M.Sc., M.A, M.F.A, M.Tech., M.B.A, M.C.A, M.Phil. and Ph.D. degrees.

== History ==
On 12 April 2010, the government of Andhra Pradesh passed a G.O. that all colleges in Sri Potti Sriramulu Nellore district that were affiliated to Sri Venkateswara University would become affiliated to VSU.

With these orders SVU PG Centre in Kavali, NBKR Engineering College in Vidyanagar, 52 degree and PG colleges, 12 MBA/MCA colleges, V.R. Law college, 12 B.Ed. colleges, two oriental colleges in SPSR Nellore District came under VSU. NBKR Engineering college later shifted its affiliation to JNTU Anantapur.

== Administration ==
As of February 2021, Budithi Rajasekhar IAS is the Vice Chancellor. L.V.Krishna Reddy is the registrar.

== Criticism ==
The university, received criticism over its recruitment process. Former Vice-Chancellor G. Rajarami Reddy mainly focused on recruitment rather than infrastructure, which delayed attainment of University Grants Commission (India) 12 B Status.

He recruited 19 teaching faculty members in December 2013. No tourism studies faculty were qualified in the tourism management and no biotechnology qualified faculty were in the department of biotechnology. He showed integrated biotechnology as biotechnology in the recruitment notification. The 45 non-teaching recruitment was criticized widely because the posts of deputy registrar, assistant registrar and senior assistants were given to those who lacked essential qualifications as per UGC norms. The recruitment was in June 2014 while a ban on recruitment and appointments in the state of Andhra Pradesh was in place. The issue is under the view of Lokayukta Andhra Pradesh.

While inaugurating the university's official web domain (simhapuriuniv.ac.in), the key people grossly neglected safeguarding and renewing the prior domain (simhapuriuniv.org) resulting in its misuse by some fake degree racketeers. This issue came to light on 14 August 2014. Fake degrees were widely available in North India. The government of Chhattisgarh state black-listed VSU degrees.

The overall strength of the students in university colleges has been decreasing. Students claimed that this was because of administration policies. A research scholar tried to commit suicide by immolating himself on the top floor of a building in university campus. He took this step as VSU officials refused to recommend his name to UGC for a fellowship.

Terrorists hacked the university website and posted illicit content. The hacking exposed failures in protecting its administrative set-up, which ought to have been kept a secret, and paved way for its internal affairs reaching terror elements.

University officials maintain their own web servers, but lack the knowledge to do so securely. The appointment of a state public information officer of VSU was criticized. K. Narasimha Rao, an assistant professor, was the information officer for many years instead of the registrar or a senior professor. Rao was criticized for sending wrong and improper information to all Right to Information Act, 2005 applications.
