= Lok Niwas, Leh =

Official residence of the Lieutenant Governor of Ladakh

- Former names: Raj Niwas

General information
- Location: Near KBR Airport, Skara Yokma, Leh, Ladakh 194101
- Coordinates: 34.147445°N 77.554036°E
- Current tenants: Vinai Kumar Saxena
- Owner: Administration of Ladakh

Website
- https://lokniwas.ladakh.gov.in/home

Lok Niwas, Leh, formerly known as Raj Niwas, is the official residence and workplace of the Lieutenant Governor of Ladakh in Leh, the capital of Ladakh. It also houses the Lieutenant Governor's Secretariat.

The residence is located at Skara Yokma, near Kushok Bakula Rimpochee Airport in Leh.

The building was formerly known as Raj Niwas. In 2025, the Government of India decided to rename the official residences of Lieutenant Governors from Raj Niwas to Lok Niwas. Ladakh's Raj Niwas was subsequently renamed Lok Niwas.

The present Lieutenant Governor of Ladakh is Vinai Kumar Saxena, who took office on 13 March 2026.

== See also ==
- List of official residences of India
- Lok Niwas
