= Anugraha =

General information
- Coordinates: 12.9951375°N 77.5842882°E
- Current tenants: Former Chief Minister Siddaramaiah
- Owner: Government of Karnataka
- Operator: Government of Karnataka

Anugraha is the official residence of the Chief Minister of Karnataka. It is located on Kumarakrupa Road, in its capital city Bangalore, and occupies 60 squares adjacent to the Chief Minister's home office.

Anugraha is heavily guarded and is considered to be one of the safest homes in Bangalore. There is also a belief that Anugraha has vaastu fault, leading several chief ministers to require renovations to the home before occupying the building. The current occupant of Anugraha is Siddaramaiah.

== See also ==
- List of official residences of India
