= Oakover =

Coordinates: 31°5′40.63″N 77°10′32.45″E

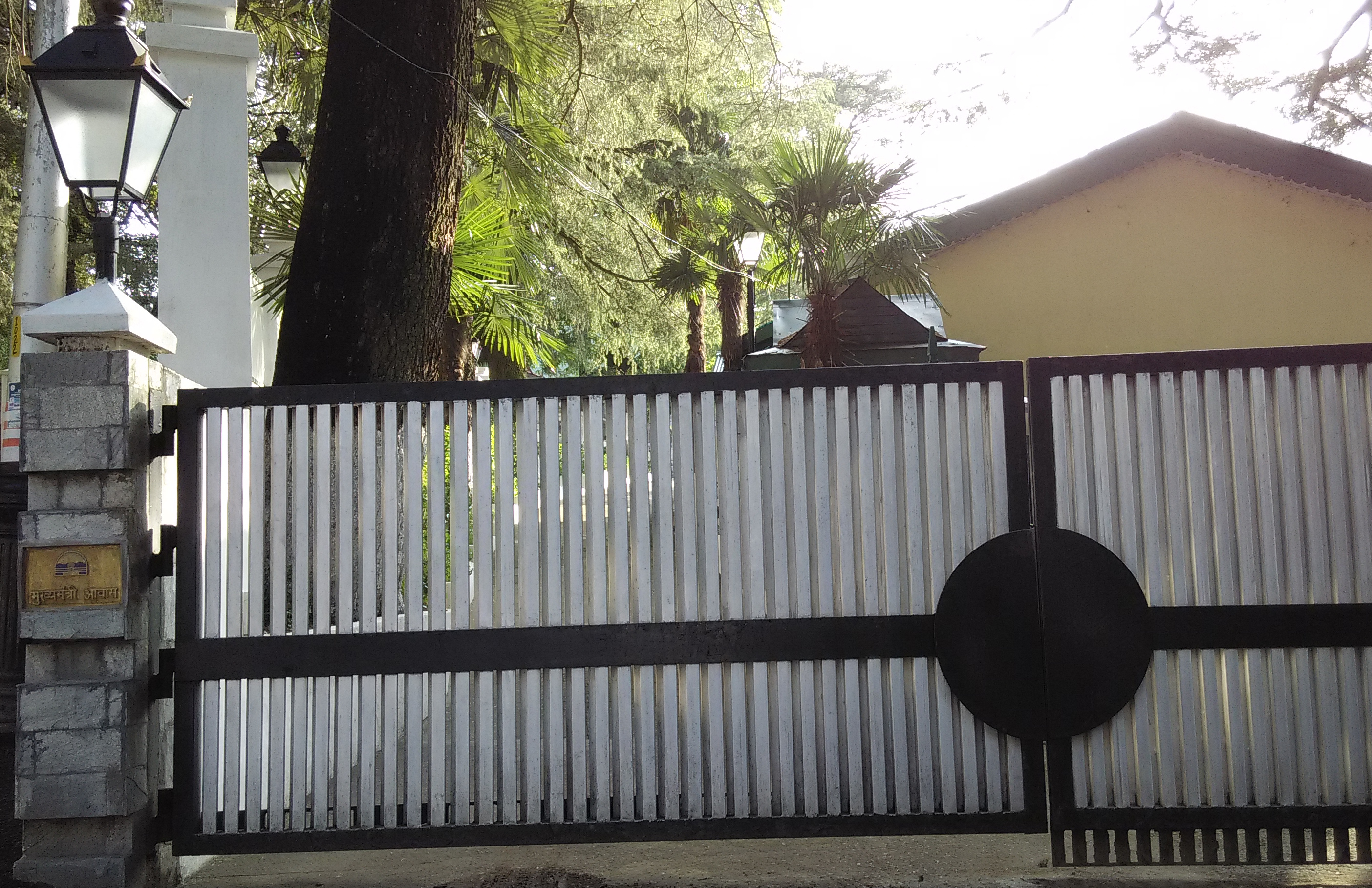
- Entry gate of Oakover
- Interactive map of the Oakover area

General information
- Location: Bemloi, Shimla, India
- Current tenants: Sukhvinder Singh Sukhu (CM of Himachal Pradesh)
- Construction started: 1861

Oakover is a historic building in Shimla, Himachal Pradesh, India. It is the official residence of the Chief Minister of Himachal Pradesh.

== History ==
Oakover was one of the earliest houses built in Shimla, a hill station that served as the summer capital of British India. It was originally owned by the Maharajas of Patiala, a princely state that was allied with the British. However, in 1891, the Maharaja of Patiala was banned from entering Shimla by the British Viceroy, Lord Lansdowne, for allegedly eloping with the Viceroy’s daughter. To avenge this insult, the Maharaja founded Chail, a rival town to Shimla, at a higher elevation. Oakover was then sold to the British government and became the residence of various officials and dignitaries. After India’s independence in 1947, Oakover was transferred to the state government of Himachal Pradesh and became the official residence of the Chief Minister in 1971.

== Construction ==
Oakover is a two-storey building with a sloping roof and wooden balconies. It is built in the colonial style of architecture, with a blend of European and Indian elements. The building is surrounded by a lush garden and a stone wall. The entrance gate of Oakover has a sign that reads “Oakover, Residence of the Chief Minister, Himachal Pradesh. The building has a spacious hall, a drawing room, a dining room, a library, and several bedrooms and bathrooms. The building also has a fireplace, a heating system, and a generator. The building is well-maintained and renovated from time to time.

== The Bungalows ==
Oakover has several bungalows within its premises, which are used for accommodating guests and staff. The bungalows are named after various flowers, such as Rose, Jasmine, Lily, and Orchid. The bungalows are also built in the colonial style, with wooden floors and ceilings, and have modern amenities. The bungalows have a scenic view of the mountains and the valley.

== Workplace ==
Oakover is not only the residence of the Chief Minister, but also his workplace. The building has a separate office wing, where the Chief Minister conducts his official meetings and affairs. The office wing has a conference room, a secretariat, and a media room. The office wing is connected to the main building by a corridor. The office wing is equipped with computers, phones, fax machines, and other communication devices. The office wing also has a security system and a fire alarm. The office wing is staffed by the Chief Minister’s personal assistants, secretaries, and advisors.

== In art and popular culture ==
British photographer Samuel Bourne travelled through India beginning in January 1863. He also visited Shimla and took photos featuring Oakover: Oakover, Simla Simla, from Oakover and Jakko, from Oakover.

== See also ==
- List of official residences of India
