= Varsha Bungalow =

Official residence of the Chief Minister of Maharashtra

- Alternative names: Chief Ministerial House; CM House

General information
- Location: Malabar Hills, Mumbai, Maharashtra, India
- Current tenants: Devendra Fadnavis (Chief Minister of Maharashtra); Amruta Fadnavis (Spouse of the Chief Minister of Maharashtra)
- Owner: Government of Maharashtra

Technical details
- Floor area: 12,000 sq ft (1,100 m^{2})

Varsha Bungalow is the official residence of the Chief Minister of Maharashtra. It is situated in Malabar Hills, Mumbai.

The 12,000 sq ft bungalow has a complex with an office for the CM, a waiting hall and a meeting area, a pantry to cater to the visitors and other amenities.

It is protected by the special protection team of the Maharashtra Police trained specially in the academy.

== See also ==
- List of official residences of India
