= Edward Charles Buck =

British civil servant

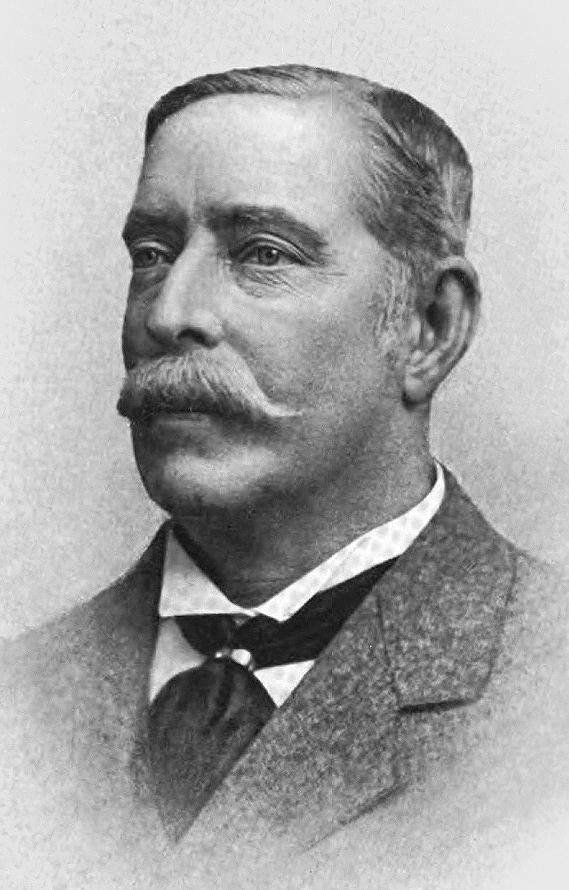
Sir Edward Charles Buck

Sir Edward Charles Buck, KCSI (1838 – 6 July 1916) was a British civil servant who served in the Indian Civil Service as a director of the department of agriculture. He came to be known as the "Grand Old Man" of Indian agriculture.

== Family and education ==
Buck was the son of Zechariah Buck, organist and master of the choristers at Norwich Cathedral for 58 years, and his second wife, Lucy Holloway. He was educated in Norwich and at Oakham School and later studied at Clare College, Cambridge, receiving a Bachelor of Laws (LL.B.) degree in 1862. In 1886, he was awarded an honorary Doctor of Law (LL.D.) degree, and in 1898 he became an honorary Fellow of Clare College.

== Career ==
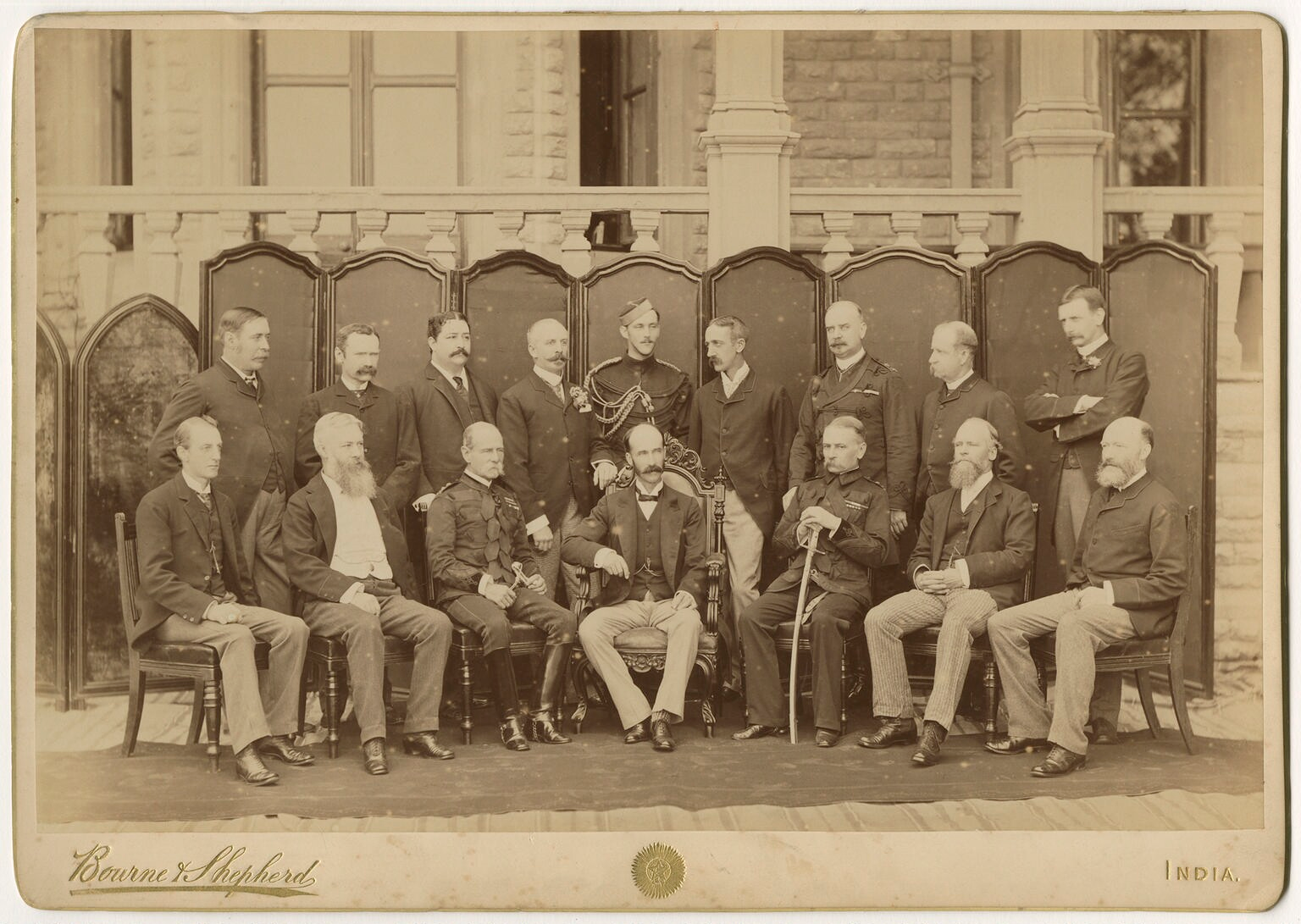
Buck (standing, left) with the Marquess of Lansdowne (seated at centre), and other Indian Civil Service officers, c. 1890.

Buck joined the Bengal Civil Service and worked as an assistant collector in the North-West Provinces in 1862. He served in the agricultural department of the North-Western Provinces from 1875 to 1880 before becoming a secretary to the Revenue and Agricultural Department in 1882, succeeding Allan Octavian Hume.

Along with Lockwood Kipling and others he was involved in the promotion of arts, including the use of photography for documentation. He was also involved in nearly shutting down the Archaeological Survey of India.

He was keen outdoorsman and one of his hobbies was "to plunge with a native hunter into a Himalayan forest, which he would penetrate before the dawn of day". From 1882 to 1896 he resided at The Retreat in Mashobra, sharing it for some years with Courtenay Ilbert and also with Earl Roberts when he was Commander-in-Chief. The property was later purchased by the Government for use by the Viceroy of India.

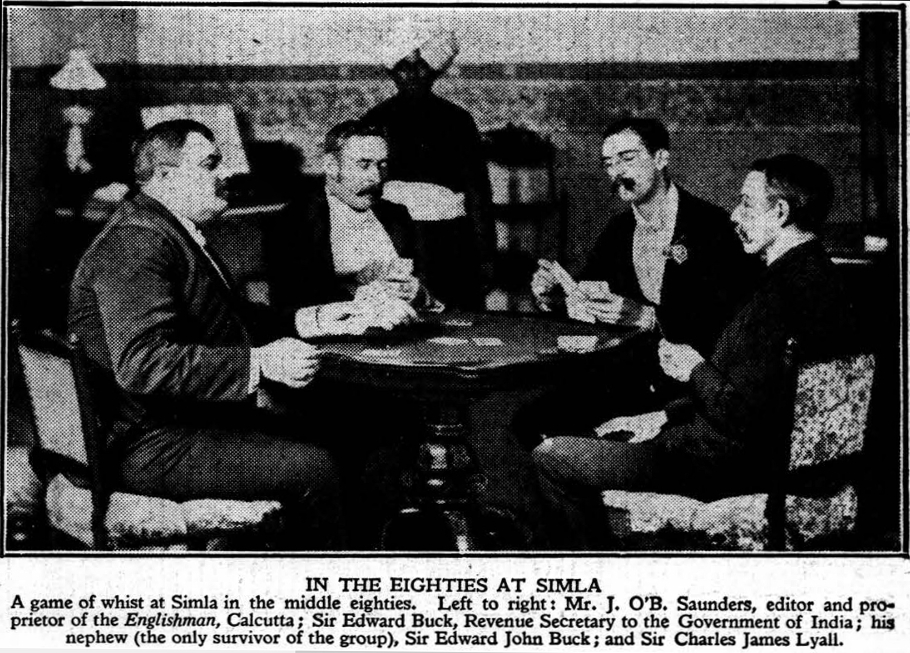
Buck (second from left) with J. O'Brien Saunders, his nephew Edward John Buck and Charles Lyall in Shimla, 1880s.

== Recognition and later life ==
For his contribution to agriculture in India, Buck came to be called the "Grand Old Man" of Indian agriculture. In recognition of his efforts to make the land revenue system more efficient, he was knighted in 1886 and made a Knight Commander of the Order of the Star of India (KCSI) in 1897.

He retired in 1897, though in 1905 he served as a delegate to the International Agricultural Conference in Rome. He died while attending an agriculture conference in Rome in 1916. His nephew, Sir Edward John Buck (1862-1948), was for many years a Reuters correspondent in India. Another nephew was Cecil Henry Buck who served in the Indian army.
