= 5, Kalidas Marg =

Official Residence of Chief Minister of Uttar Pradesh, India

- Interactive map of the 5, Kalidas Marg area

General information
- Location: Kalidas Marg, Lucknow, India
- Coordinates: 26.8370712°N 80.9567709°E
- Current tenants: Yogi Adityanath (Chief Minister of Uttar Pradesh)
- Owner: Government of Uttar Pradesh
- Landlord: Lucknow Development Authority

5, Kalidas Marg is the official residence of the Chief Minister of Uttar Pradesh located at Kalidas Marg in Lucknow, India. It occupies a large area along with the bungalow. As it is the residence of the chief of the state its security is maintained by the special cell of Lucknow Police. Currently it is occupied by the Yogi Adityanath who is the 23rd chief minister of the state since March 2017.

== See also ==
- List of official residences of India
