= Rashtrapati Niketan =

Official retreat of the President of India

Coordinates: 30.3568025°N 78.0661364°E

- Interactive map of the Rashtrapati Niketan area

General information
- Type: Official retreat
- Location: Dehradun, Uttarakhand, India
- Current tenants: Draupadi Murmu (President of India)
- Completed: 1920
- Renovated: 2016

Technical details
- Grounds: 237 acres (96 ha)

Rashtrapati Niketan, is an official retreat of the President of India located in Dehradun, Uttarakhand. Established as a summer camp for horses in the Governor General's Bodyguard, the Niketan was built in 1920 as the residence of the unit's commandant. Developed into a presidential retreat during the presidency of Fakhruddin Ali Ahmed, it fell into disuse after 1998. Niketan was renovated and an annexe built during the presidency of Pranab Mukherjee. It is one of three presidential retreats in India, the other two being the Rashtrapati Nilayam in Hyderabad and the Rashtrapati Niwas in Shimla.

== History ==
The Rashtrapati Niketan was originally established in 1838 as a camp for the summering of horses and remounts of the Governor General's Bodyguard. The horses spent the months of May to July here, shielded from the summer heat of Delhi. After India attained independence, this practice was continued by the President's Bodyguard. The Niketan building was built as a bungalow for the Commandant of the Bodyguard in 1920 and was known as the Commandant's Bungalow. The estate and the building were turned into a presidential retreat in 1975-76 for President Fakhruddin Ali Ahmed as an alternative summer retreat to the one in Shimla. The bungalow was renamed the Rashtrapati Ashiana in 1976, the name suggested by then first lady Abida Ahmed. Ashiana hosted Presidents Ahmed, Neelam Sanjiva Reddy, Zail Singh and K. R. Narayanan who stayed there in 1998. The Niketan then fell into disuse before it was renovated and inaugurated in 2016 by President Pranab Mukherjee.

== Location and layout ==
The estate is located on Rajapur Road, Dehradun near the National Institute for the Visually Handicapped. It covers an area of 237 acres and consists of the Niketan building, the annexe complex, a swimming pool and the upper and lower stables. The estate has an orchard of litchi and mango trees. The stables continue to be used by the President's Bodyguard for summering its weaker horses from the sweltering heat of Delhi.

== Renovation ==
The Niketan was renovated and inaugurated in September 2016 by President Pranab Mukherji. The building was retrofitted with seismic bands to make it earthquake resistant and the estate underwent extensive landscaping and renovation of its system of irrigation channels. The restoration of the Niketan, where he became the first President to stay in 18 years, is a significant legacy of the Mukherjee presidency.

== Annexe ==
The annexe to the Niketan was inaugurated in 2017 by President Mukherjee. It consists of twelve low-cost housing units for officers and accompanying staff of the Rashtrapati Bhavan. These units have been built of compacted intermeshing blocks using an eco-friendly technology developed by the Asian Institute of Technology.

== See also ==
- List of official residences of India
- Rashtrapati Bhavan
- Rashtrapati Nilayam
- Rashtrapati Niwas
