= Lok Bhavan, Jammu =

Residence of the Lieutenant Governor of Jammu and Kashmir

Lok Bhavan (Jammu)
- Interactive map of the Lok Bhavan (Jammu) area

General information
- Type: winter residence
- Coordinates: 32.743900°N 74.870654°E
- Owner: Government of Jammu and Kashmir

Lok Bhavan formerly Raj Bhavan (translation: Government House) is the official winter residence of the Lieutenant Governor of Jammu and Kashmir Manoj Sinha. It is located in the winter capital city Jammu, Jammu and Kashmir.

Raj Bhavan of Jammu was one of the Maharaja's palace buildings, Ranbir Mahal, which is under the tenancy of the State Government of Jammu and Kashmir.

The Raj Bhavan overlooks the river Tawi. It is spread over an area of 6.17 hectares (126 kanals) and 7 marlas and has a spacious and a lawn in front where ceremonial functions are held.

The President of India, the Prime Minister of India and other dignitaries stay in the Raj Bhavan when on visit to Jammu.

== See also ==
- List of official residences of India
- Government Houses of the British Indian Empire
