= Lok Bhavan, Agartala =

Residence of the Governor of Tripura

Lok Bhavan
- লোক ভবন
- Interactive map of the Lok Bhavan area

General information
- Type: Residence of the Governor of Tripura
- Coordinates: 23.853524°N 91.284766°E
- Owner: Government of Tripura

Website
- website

Lok Bhavan formerly Raj Bhavan (translation: Government House) is the official residence of the governor of Tripura. The residence is located in the state's capital city of Agartala. A new Raj Bhavan was built and inaugurated in April 2018. The previous Raj Bhavan was built in 1917, and was known as the Pushbanta Palace prior to India's independence. The previous Raj Bhavan edifice is intended to become a museum and research center in honor of King of Tripura, Maharaja Birendra Kishore Manikya.

== See also ==
- Government Houses of the British Indian Empire
- List of Raj Bhavan
