= Lok Bhavan, Shillong =

Indian governor's house in Medhalaya

- Interactive map of the Lok Bhavan, Shillong area

General information
- Coordinates: 25°34′22″N 91°53′19″E
- Current tenants: C. H. Vijayashankar
- Owner: Government of Meghalaya

References
- Website

Lok Bhavan formerly Raj Bhavan (translation: Government House) is the official residence of the governor of Meghalaya CH Vijayashakar. It is located in the capital city of Shillong, Meghalaya. The Government House was renamed as Raj Bhavan in 6 December 1951. CH Vijayashankar, the present governor stays at Raj Bhavan, Shillong.

In January 2024, a second Raj Bhavan was opened in Tura, located in western Garo Hills region, by president Droupadi Murmu.

== History ==
Sir Henry Cotton approved the work on the reconstruction of a new government house after W Arundell, the executive engineer of the Assam Bengal Railway, drew up a sketch plan in May 1898. The new building was earthquake proof and was built with wood unlike the earlier iron corrugated sheets. The work by PWD under the supervision of Walter Nightingale and GJ Perran cost Rs.187,713. The new building with many new modifications, resembling that of a country cottage in England, was completed in October 1903.

In September 2005, the late former president APJ Abdul Kalam interacted with Shillong school children at Raj Bhavan and made them take a 10 point oath.

On the Republic Day on 26 January 2025, the Raj Bhavan was opened to the public.

== See also ==
- Government Houses of the British Indian Empire
- List of governors of Meghalaya
