= Lok Bhavan, Amaravati =

Residence of the Governor of AP

Lok Bhavan
- Praja Bhavanamu
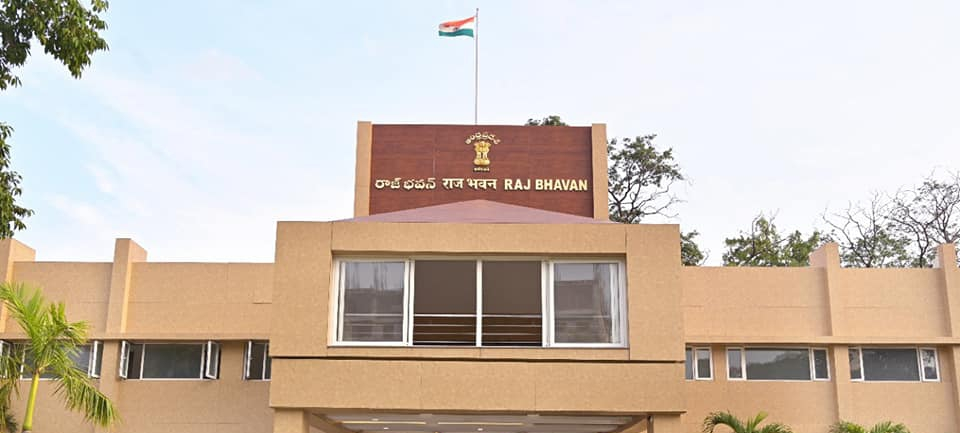

General information
- Type: Main residence
- Location: Governorpeta, Vijayawada, Andhra Pradesh Capital Region, India
- Coordinates: 16.5084°N 80.6305°E
- Current tenants: S. Abdul Nazeer
- Owner: Government of Andhra Pradesh

Lok Bhavan, formerly Raj Bhavan (translation: Government House) is the official residence of the Governor of Andhra Pradesh, Syed Abdul Nazeer. It is located in Vijayawada, Andhra Pradesh Capital Region, Andhra Pradesh, India.

== History ==
After the formation of Telangana state in 2014, E. S. L. Narasimhan served as the joint governor for both Andhra Pradesh and Telangana until 2019. Biswabhusan Harichandan was appointed as the 23rd governor of Andhra Pradesh in July 2019. A separate Raj Bhavan was needed for the residence of the governor. The Government of Andhra Pradesh converted the government irrigation house into the Raj Bhavan in 2019.

The name was changed from Raj Bhavan to Lok Bhavan in December 2025 alongside other official residences across various states. The state cabinet chaired by N. Chandrababu Naidu has approved the contract for the construction of the Lok Bhavan complex at the Amaravati Government Complex at a cost of ₹212 crore on 4 December 2025. The complex includes the governor’s Residence, durbar hall, governor’s office, two guest houses, and staff quarters. The project is overseen by Andhra Pradesh Capital Region Development Authority and the Ministry of Municipal Administration and Urban Development has awarded the contract to BSR Infratech India in the same month. The construction began in mid-2026.
