= Lok Bhavan, Srinagar =

Residence of the Jammu & Kashmir Lieutenant Governor

Lok Bhavan (Srinagar)
- Interactive map of the Lok Bhavan (Srinagar) area

General information
- Type: summer residence
- Coordinates: 34.086274°N 74.884477°E
- Owner: Government of Jammu and Kashmir

Lok Bhavan formerly Raj Bhavan (translation: Government House) is the official summer residence of the Lieutenant Governor of Jammu and Kashmir Manoj Sinha. It is located in the summer capital city Srinagar, Jammu and Kashmir.

== Lok Bhavan, Srinagar (Summer Capital City) ==
The Lok Bhavan is a small two-storey building mostly made of wood; it has lush green lawns having different varieties of roses and other beautiful flowers.

The President of India and the Prime Minister of India usually stay in the Lok Bhavan on their visits to Kashmir.

On 2 December 2025, "Raj Bhavan" in Srinagar as well as in Jammu was renamed to "Lok Bhavan" as per the directions of the Ministry of Home Affairs (India).

== See also ==
- List of official residences of India
- Government Houses of the British Indian Empire
