= List of governors of Andhra Pradesh =

Governor of Andhra Pradesh
- ĀndhraPradēś Governoru
- Emblem of Andhra Pradesh

- Flag of India

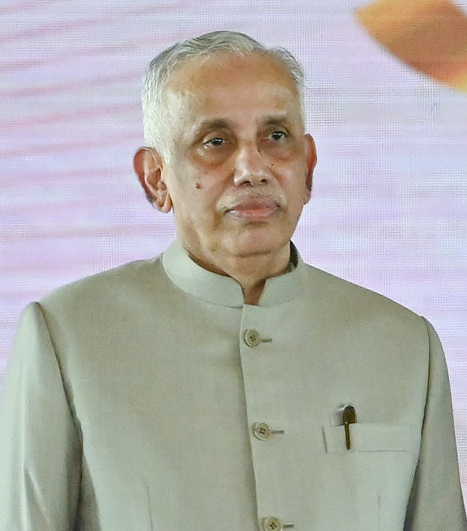
- Incumbent; Syed Abdul Nazeer since 24 February 2023
- Style: His/Her Excellency
- Status: Head of State
- Reports to: President of India; Government of India
- Residence: Lok Bhavan, Amaravati, Andhra Pradesh
- Appointer: President of India
- Term length: At the pleasure of the president
- Precursor: Governor of Andhra State
- Inaugural holder: Chandulal Madhavlal Trivedi
- Formation: 1 November 1956; 70 years ago
- Salary: ₹350,000 (US$3,700) (per month)
- Website: www.lokbhavan.ap.gov.in

The state of Andhra Pradesh in India has had 24 Governors since 1953

The governor of Andhra Pradesh is the head of state of the Indian state of Andhra Pradesh. Governors in India have similar powers and functions at the state level as those of the president of India at the central level. They exist in the state appointed by the president of India and they are not local to the state that they are appointed to govern. The factors based on which the president evaluates the candidates is not mentioned in the constitution. The governor acts as the nominal head whereas the real power lies with the Chief Minister of the state and their council of ministers.This is a list of governors of Andhra Pradesh, including Andhra State and united Andhra Pradesh, in office from 1953 to the present date. The official residence of the governor is the Lok Bhavan, situated in Vijayawada. E. S. L. Narasimhan is the longest serving governor, serving for 9 years and 208 days.

The current incumbent is Syed Abdul Nazeer since 24 February 2023.

== Qualifications ==
Article 157 and Article 158 of the Constitution of India specify eligibility requirements for the post of governor. They are as follows:

A governor must:

- be a citizen of India.
- be at least 35 years of age.
- not be a member of either house of the parliament or house of the state legislature.
- not hold any office of profit.

== Powers and functions ==
The governor enjoys many different types of powers:

- Executive powers related to administration, appointments and removals,
- Legislative powers related to lawmaking and the state legislature, that is Saasana Sabha (Legislative Assembly) or Saasana Mandali (Legislative Council), and
- Discretionary powers to be carried out according to the discretion of the Governor.

Apart from enjoying various constitutional powers, the governor of Andhra Pradesh is the ex-officio Chancellor of the state universities of Andhra Pradesh. The universities include Acharya N. G. Ranga Agricultural University, Acharya Nagarjuna University, Adikavi Nannaya University, Andhra University, Cluster University, Dr. Abdul Haq Urdu University, Dr. B.R. Ambedkar University, Dr. N.T.R. University of Health Sciences, Dr. YSR Architecture & Fine Arts University, Dr. Y.S.R. Horticultural University, Dravidian University, Jawaharlal Nehru Technological University (Anantapur), Jawaharlal Nehru Technological University (Kakinada), Krishna University, Rayalaseema University, Sri Krishnadevaraya University, Sri Padmavathi Mahila Visvavidyalayam, Sri Venkateswara University, Sri Venkateswara Vedic University, Sri Venkateswara Veterinary University, Vikrama Simhapuri University and Yogi Vemana University

== List ==
Legend

- ^{†} Died in office
- ^{§} Transferred
- ^{‡} Resigned/removed

Color key

- indicates acting/additional charge

=== Governors of Andhra State (1953–1956) ===
#	Portrait	Name (born – died)	Home state	Tenure in office			Appointer (President)
#	Portrait	Name (born – died)	Home state	From	To	Time in office	Appointer (President)
1		Chandulal Madhavlal Trivedi (1893–1980)	Bombay State	1 October 1953	31 October 1956	3 years, 30 days	Rajendra Prasad

=== Governors of Andhra Pradesh (1956–present) ===
#	Portrait	Name (born – died)	Home state	Tenure in office			Appointer (President)
#	Portrait	Name (born – died)	Home state	From	To	Time in office	Appointer (President)
1		Chandulal Madhavlal Trivedi (1893–1980)	Bombay State	1 November 1956	31 July 1957	272 days	Rajendra Prasad
2		Bhim Sen Sachar (1894–1978)	Punjab	1 August 1957	7 September 1962	5 years, 37 days	Rajendra Prasad
3		General; S. M. Shrinagesh (Retd) (1903–1977)	Maharashtra	8 September 1962	3 May 1964^{[§]} (Note: Transferred as the Governor of Madras State)	1 year, 238 days	Sarvepalli Radhakrishnan
4		Pattom A. Thanu Pillai (1885–1970)	Kerala	4 May 1964	11 April 1968	3 years, 343 days	Sarvepalli Radhakrishnan
5		Khandubhai Kasanji Desai (1898–1975)	Gujarat	11 April 1968	25 January 1975^{[‡]}	6 years, 289 days	Zakir Husain
6		Justice; S. Obul Reddy (1916–1996) (Acting)	Andhra Pradesh	25 January 1975	9 January 1976	349 days	Fakhruddin Ali Ahmed
7		Mohan Lal Sukhadia (1916–1982)	Rajasthan	10 January 1976	15 June 1976^{[§]} (Note: Transferred as the Governor of Tamil Nadu)	157 days	Fakhruddin Ali Ahmed
8		Ramchandra Dhondiba Bhandare (1916–1988)	Maharashtra	16 June 1976	16 February 1977^{[‡]}	245 days	Fakhruddin Ali Ahmed
9		Justice; B. J. Divan (1919–2012) (Acting)	Gujarat	17 February 1977	4 May 1977	76 days	B. D. Jatti
10		Sharda Mukherjee (1919–2007)	Maharashtra	5 May 1977	14 August 1978^{[§]} (Note: Transferred as the Governor of Gujarat)	1 year, 101 days	B. D. Jatti
11		K. C. Abraham (1899–1986)	Kerala	15 August 1978	14 August 1983	4 years, 364 days	Neelam Sanjiva Reddy
12		Thakur Ram Lal (1929–2002)	Himachal Pradesh	15 August 1983	29 August 1984	1 year, 14 days	Zail Singh
13		Shankar Dayal Sharma (1918–1999)	Madhya Pradesh	29 August 1984	26 November 1985^{[§]} (Note: Transferred as the Governor of Punjab and Administrator of Chandigarh)	1 year, 89 days	Zail Singh
14		Kumudben Joshi (1934–2022)	Gujarat	26 November 1985	7 February 1990^{[‡]}	4 years, 73 days	Zail Singh
15		Krishan Kant (1927–2002)	Punjab	7 February 1990	21 August 1997^{[‡]} (Note: Resigned to become the Vice President of India)	7 years, 195 days	Ramaswamy Venkataraman
16		Gopala Ramanujam (1915- 2001) (Additional Charge)	Tamil Nadu	22 August 1997	23 November 1997	93 days	K. R. Narayanan
17		C. Rangarajan (born 1932)	Tamil Nadu	24 November 1997	3 January 2003	5 years, 40 days	K. R. Narayanan
18		Surjit Singh Barnala (1925–2017)	Punjab	3 January 2003	3 November 2004^{[§]}	1 year, 305 days	A. P. J. Abdul Kalam
19		Sushilkumar Shinde (born 1941)	Maharashtra	4 November 2004	29 January 2006^{[‡]}	1 year, 86 days	A. P. J. Abdul Kalam
20		Rameshwar Thakur (1925–2015) (Additional Charge)	Jharkhand	29 January 2006	22 August 2007^{[§]} (Note: Transferred as the Governor of Karnataka)	1 year, 205 days	A. P. J. Abdul Kalam
21		N. D. Tiwari (1925–2018)	Uttarakhand	22 August 2007	27 December 2009^{[‡]}	2 years, 127 days	Pratibha Patil
22		E. S. L. Narasimhan (born 1945); IAS (Retd) (Additional charge till 22 January 2010)	Tamil Nadu	28 December 2009	24 July 2019^{[§]} (Note: Transferred as the Governor of Telangana)	9 years, 208 days	Pratibha Patil
23		Biswabhusan Harichandan (born 1934)	Odisha	24 July 2019	23 February 2023^{[§]} (Note: Transferred as the Governor of Chhattisgarh)	3 years, 214 days	Ram Nath Kovind
24	86×86px	Justice (Retd); Syed Abdul Nazeer (born 1958)	Karnataka	24 February 2023	Incumbent	3 years, 265 days	Droupadi Murmu

== Timeline ==
Timeline of Andhra Pradesh governors

== See also ==
- List of governors of Telangana
- Chief Minister of Andhra Pradesh
- Governor (India)

== Oath ==
Nenu... [Ikkada mee peru cheppali], devuni perita pramanam chesthunnanu. Nenu dharmanusruthamga... [ / Andhra Pradesh] rashtra dhavaniga (Governor ga) naa vidhulanu nirvahisthanani, naa shakthi vanchana lekunda raajyanganni, chattaniki liybadi prathipalisthanani, kaapadathanani, mariyu nenu... [Telangana / Andhra Pradesh] prajala seva koraku, vaari kshemam koraku nannu nenu samarpinchukuntanani devuni sakshiga pramanam chesthunnanu."
