= Rashtrapati Niwas, Mashobra =

Coordinates: 31°06′50″N 77°14′52″E

Rashtrapati Niwas, Mashobra, Shimla
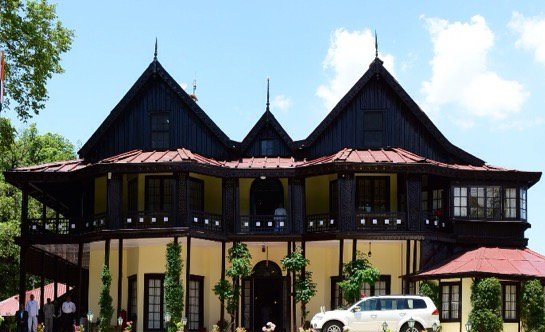
- Rashtrapati Niwas
- Interactive map of the Rashtrapati Niwas, Mashobra, Shimla area

General information
- Type: Summer Retreat
- Architectural style: European
- Location: Chharabra, Shimla, Himachal Pradesh, India
- Current tenants: Draupadi Murmu (President of India)
- Completed: 1850

Rashtrapati Niwas, previously known as The Retreat Building is the official summer retreat of the President of India near Chharabra, Shimla, in the state of Himachal Pradesh. The President stays at the building for at least two weeks during summer and conducts official business. It is located 13 km away from the city of Shimla and is a thousand feet higher than the Shimla Ridge Top, which is part of the Himalayas.

The other presidential homes are Rashtrapati Bhavan in New Delhi, Rashtrapati Niketan in Dehradun, Uttarakhand, and Rashtrapati Nilayam in Hyderabad, Telangana.

== History ==
The building was originally constructed by the then Medical Superintendent of Simla, whose name is not known (referred to merely as Mr. C____ in Simla Past and Present by Sir Edward J. Buck). The Retreat was taken on lease from the Raja of Koti by Lord William Hay. During this period, the local population called it "Larty Sahib Ki Kothi", i.e. house of Mr. Larty, as Lord William Hay was named by locals. The lease deed contained stipulations that: the two roads from Simla and Mashobra village should, in the interest of native population of Koti State, be open to the public; no trees should be felled; and no cattle be slaughtered on the grounds. The lease of the Retreat was then taken by Sir William Mansfield, Commander-in-Chief, and then By Sir Edward Buck in 1881. In 1896, the Raja of Koti used his right of preemption and took the possession of the estate. Thereafter the Retreat was consigned to the government on permanent lease by the Raja of Koti. The Earl of Elgin was the first Viceroy of India to have used the Retreat as a viceregal residence. Lord Elgin secured use of the Retreat for future viceroys and constantly spent his weekends there.

Lord Mountbatten was the last viceroy to have stayed here in 1947. Subsequently, the estate was transferred to the Government of India. In 1951, Dr. Rajendra Prasad became the first President of India to visit the estate. In a historic shift in 1965, President Sarvepalli Radhakrishnan designated The Retreat as the President's summer retreat, shifting the summer residence from the Viceregal Lodge. Unlike the Viceregal Lodge, it offered a more private setting amidst oak, cedar, pine, and copper birch forests.

Since then, most Presidents spend at least a week here every summer, along with their office. On 23 April 2024, Hon'ble President of India, Smt. Droupadi Murmu, officially inaugurated the public opening of the building.

== Architecture ==
The architecture and grounds of the site make it a tourist attraction in Shimla. One outstanding feature of this building is that it is purely a wooden structure with dhajji wall construction, which features timber-framed walls filled with stone and brick, blending naturally with its surroundings. This building has an area of 10,628 square feet (987.4 m^{2}).

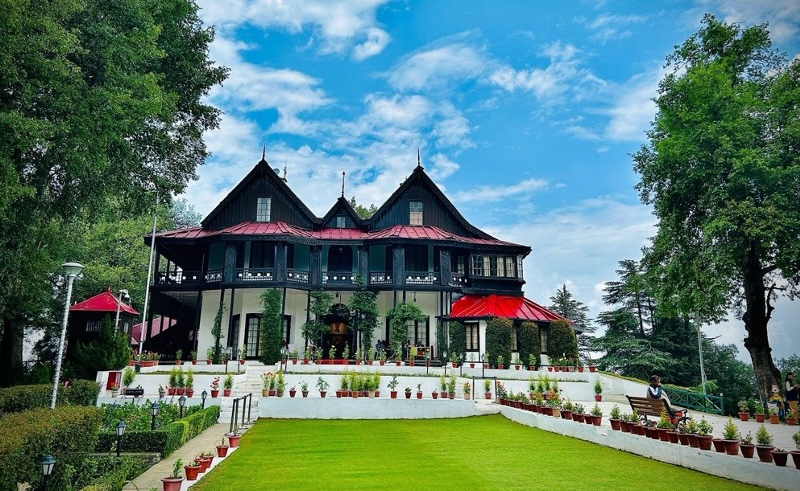
Rashtrapati Niwas Main Building

The main building of Rashtrapati Niwas, featuring earthquake-resistant dhajji wall construction, is open for public viewing. It also allows visitors to explore areas like the presidential wing and the official dining hall.

The residence features a top floor reserved for the President and her family, comprising six private rooms each with a balcony. The lower level accommodates the extensive entourage accompanying the President, including the ADC room, a drawing room, and a study with a view of the hills. This floor is adorned with British-era furnishings and includes a large dining room capable of hosting 22 guests, maintaining its original wooden fireplaces and antique switches.

A special gallery displays a large photo of the current President, Shrimati Draupadi Murmu, alongside portraits of the 14 former presidents who have visited the residence. Additionally, the gallery features a black-and-white sketch of the Niwas by a local artist and paintings depicting traditional Himachali attire. Recent photos of President Murmu and significant past visits, including Mahatma Gandhi's first visit to Shimla on 12 May 1921, are also exhibited.

== Attractions ==
=== Rashtrapati Niwas Lawn ===
The expansive lawns include arranged flower beds of tulips & roses along with views of the surrounding mountains.

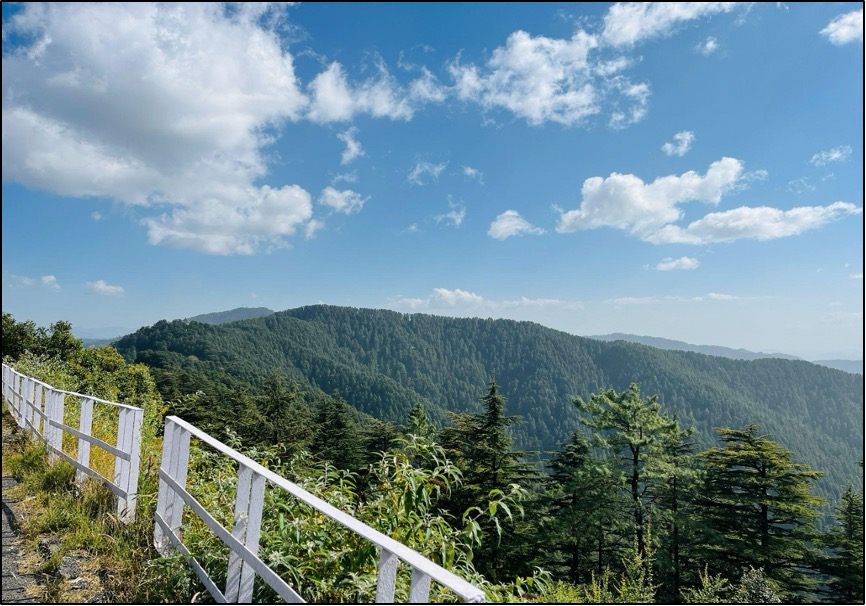
2.2 km trail through dense oak, deodar, pine trees

=== Kalyani Helipad & Nature Trail ===
Positioned at the highest elevation in the region, the Kalyani Helipad provides visitors with 360-degree views that span Shimla, Kufri, Chail, and Jakhu Hill. Visible peaks from this vantage point include Deo Tibba, Shrikhand Mahadev Peak, Badrinath, and Parvati Parvat.

Spanning approximately 2.2 kilometers from the Helipad to Gate 2, this nature trail passes through Shimla's natural flora. Trekkers can navigate through dense forests populated with oak, deodar, pine, and rhododendron trees.

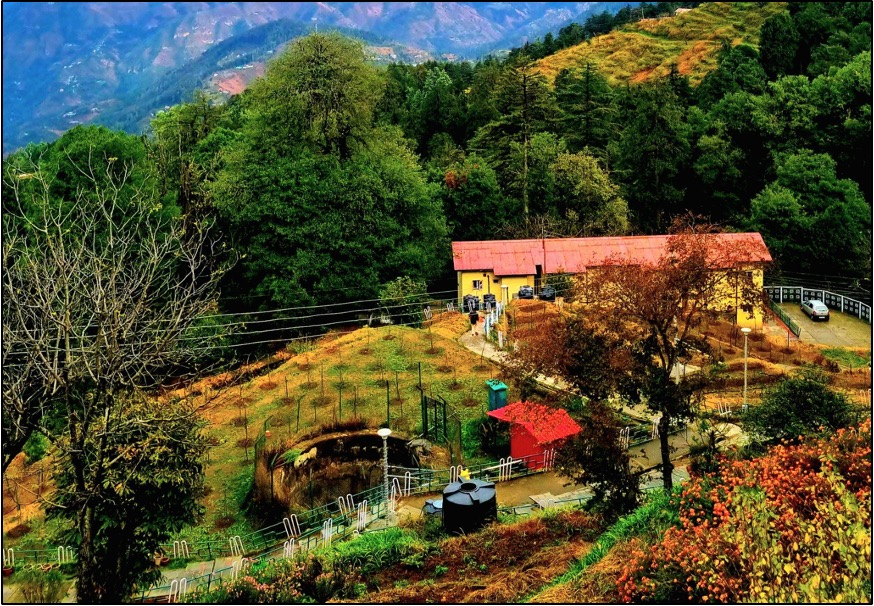
Orchard Trail

=== Slope Garden & Orchards Nature Trail ===
The slope garden displays an assortment of over 40 types of flora, including horse-chestnut, walnut, and green maple trees. It is home to 375 apple trees.

These trails are designed for those seeking outdoor adventures and include several points of interest such as viewpoints for sunrise and sunset.

== See also ==
- President of India
- Rashtrapati Bhavan
- Rashtrapati Nilayam
- Rashtrapati Niketan
- List of official residences of India
