= Rashtrapati Nilayam =

Coordinates: 17.504597°N 78.521531°E

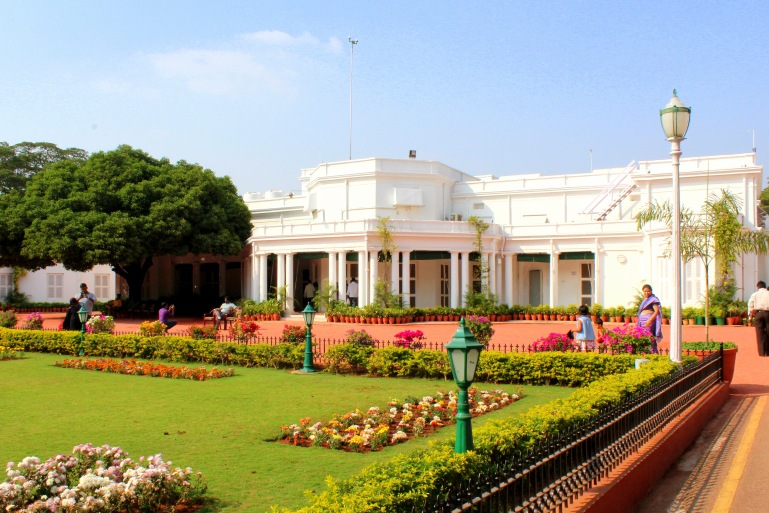
- Rashtrapati Nilayam, Bolaram

General information
- Type: Official retreat
- Location: Bolaram, Secunderabad, Hyderabad, Telangana, India
- Current tenants: Draupadi Murmu (President of India)
- Completed: 1860; 166 years ago

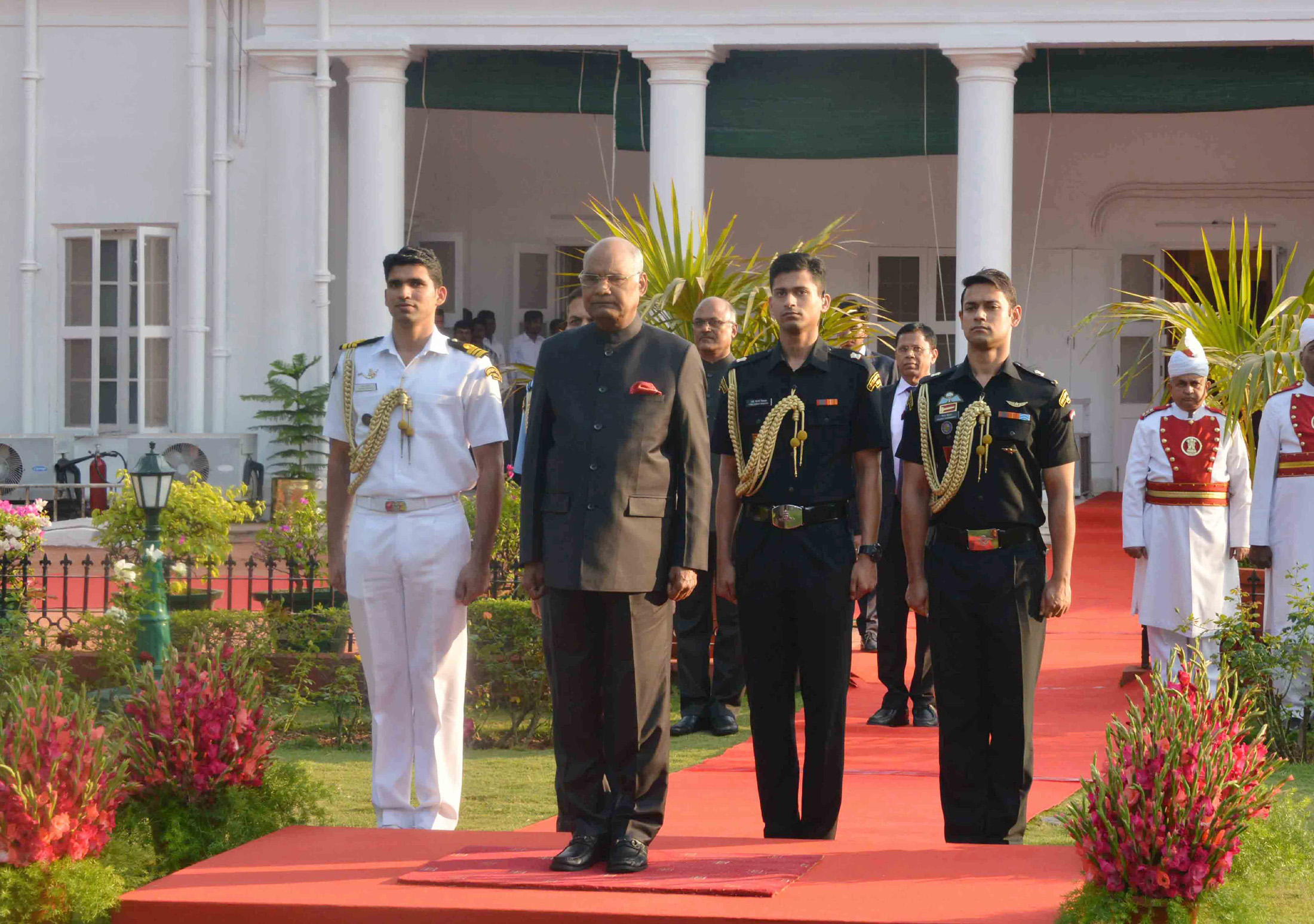
President Ram Nath Kovind hosting ‘At Home’ reception, at Rashtrapati Nilayam, Bolarum, Secunderabad on 26 December 2017

Rashtrapati Nilayam (lit. 'The president's house'), formerly known as Residency House, is the official winter retreat of the president of India located in Hyderabad, Telangana. The president stays here for at least two weeks during their winter visit and conducts official business. It is also used as a guest house for visiting dignitaries. It is located in Bolaram in Secunderabad, a neighbourhood of Hyderabad.

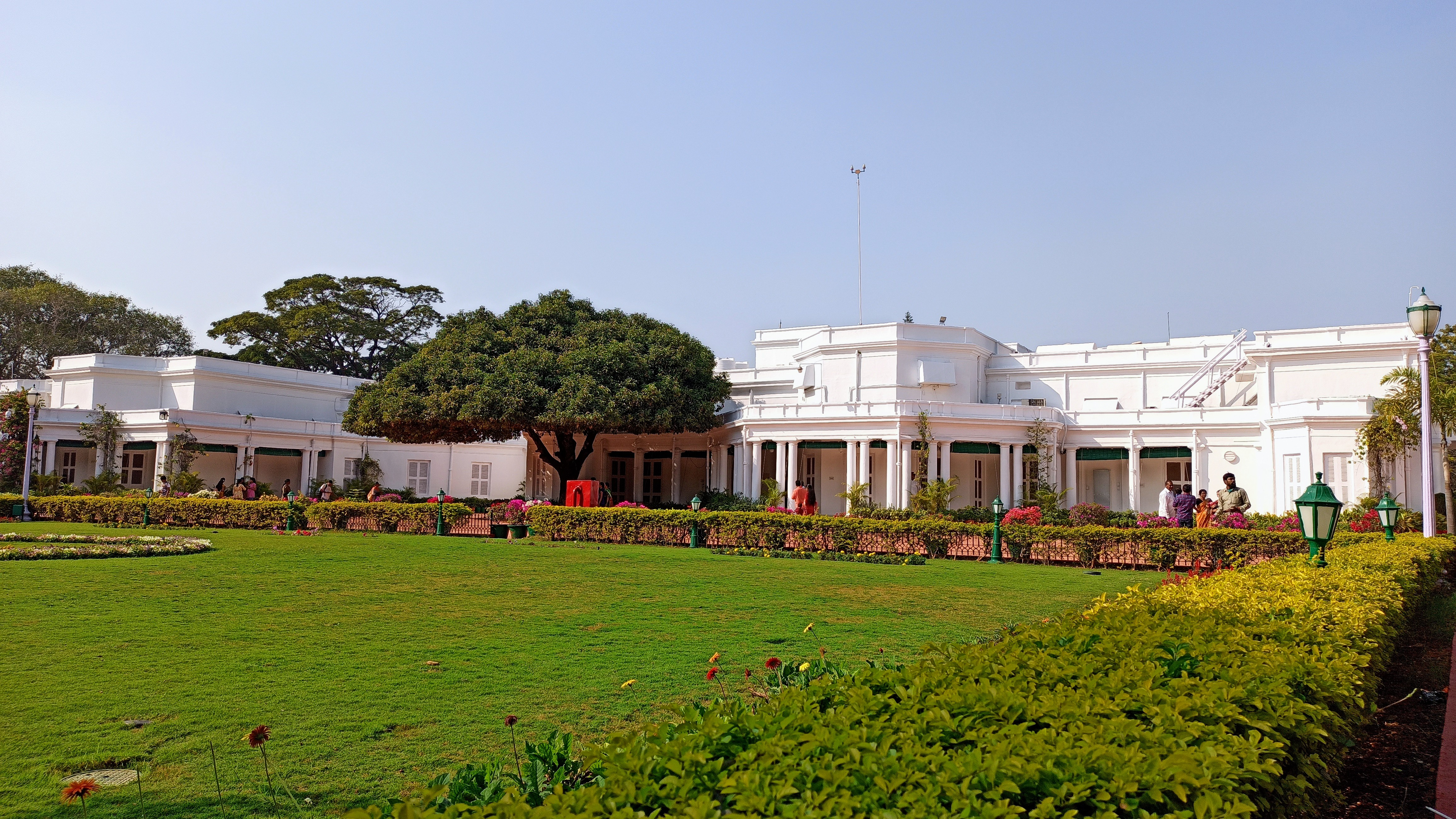
Rastrapathi Nilayam

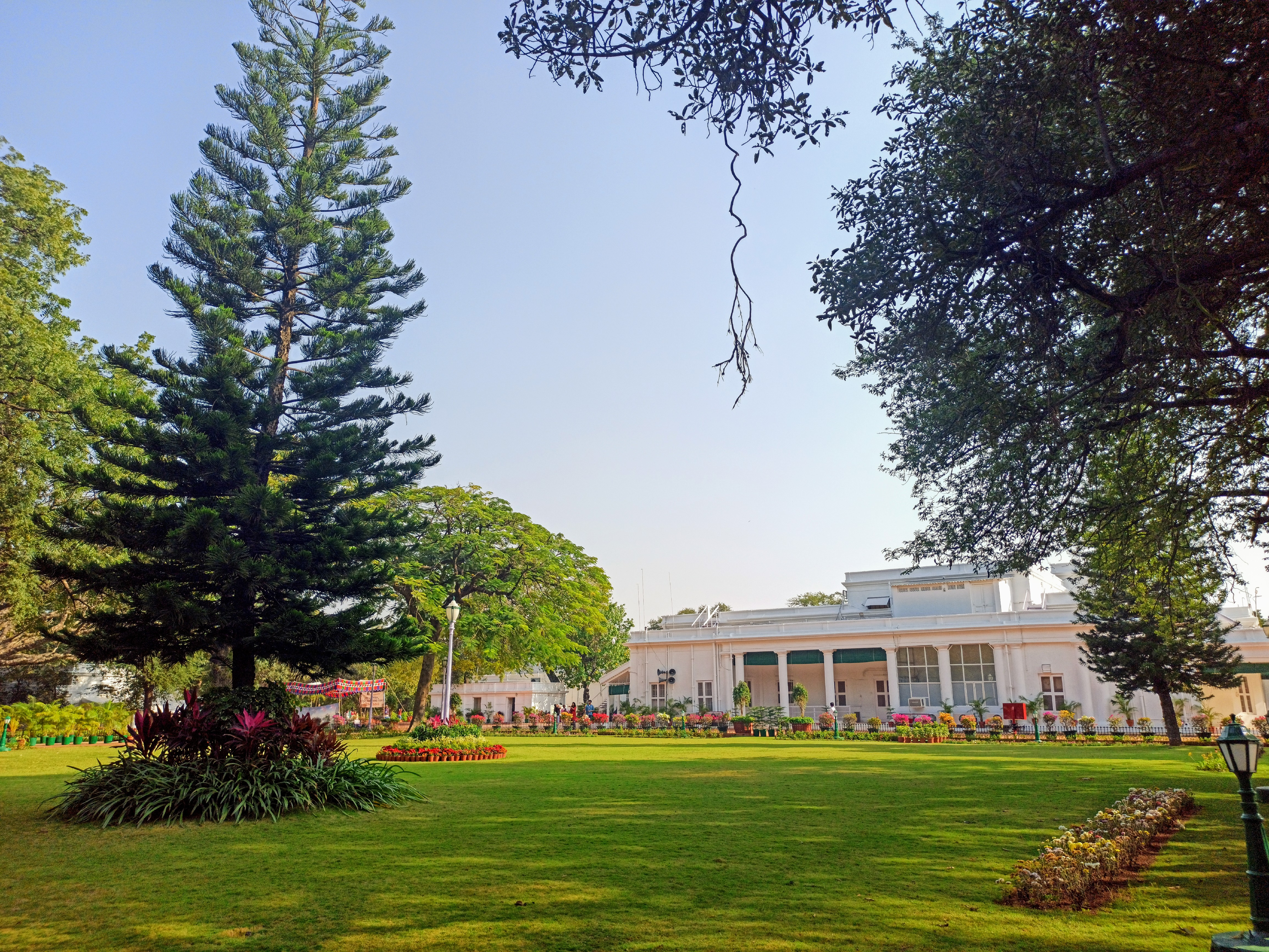
Rastrapathi Nilayam

== History ==
Originally called the Residency House, it was constructed in 1860 by Nizam Nazir-ud-Dowla. It became the country house of the British Resident at Secunderabad. After the Hyderabad state's integration into Indian Union in 1948, it became the president's retreat and used as the Southern Sojourn. The decision to open the estate to the general public marked a significant step in making India's presidential history more accessible and engaging for a wider audience.

== Architecture ==
The 16-room estate is spread over an area of 90 acres (360,000 m^{2}), consisting of single storied building besides a visitors' quarters that can accommodate 150 people. It has a Dining Hall, Durbar Hall, Morning Room, Cinema Hall, etc. A unique aspect of this Rashtrapati Nilayam is that the kitchen and dining hall are independent buildings connected with a tunnel to serve food.

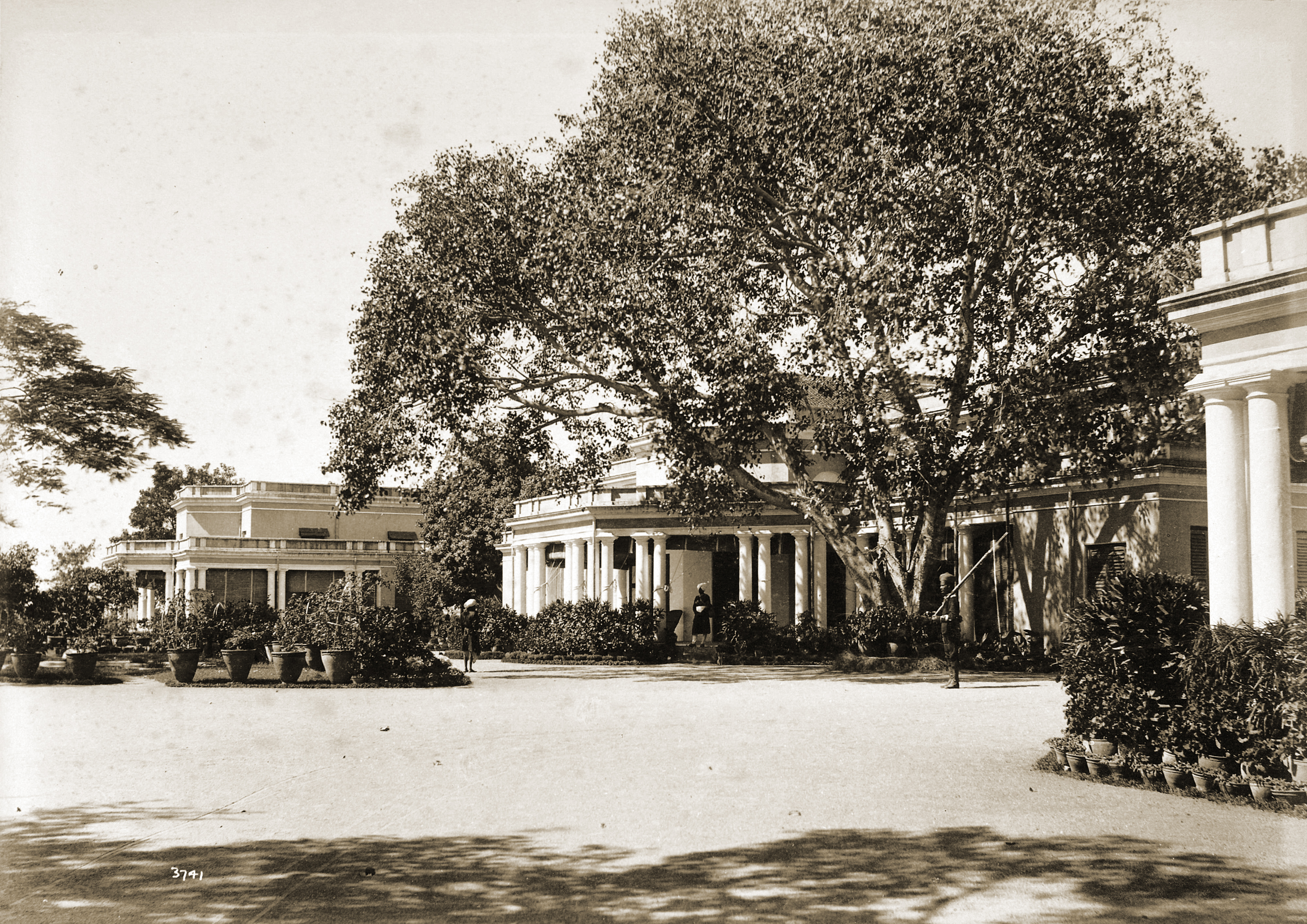
Rashtrapati Nilayam (Residency House), c. 1892, Photo: Lala Deen Dayal

The president stays in the Main Building and conducts official business from here when they visit for their winter sojourn in December every year.

The retreat's premises include a landscaped garden, seasonal flowering plants and display of potted plants around the main building, natural cascading water falls and different types of nutrition gardens.

== Attractions ==
=== Knowledge Gallery ===
It has been established to provide more information about Rashtrapati Bhavan and its estates including Rashtrapati Nilayam, along with belongings of past presidents of India. Apart from this there are enclaves dedicated to unsung heroes of Independence and chapters of Hyderabad history. The museum also showcases the cutlery used in the President's Kitchen along with pictures of the state dinners hosted by each of the past presidents.

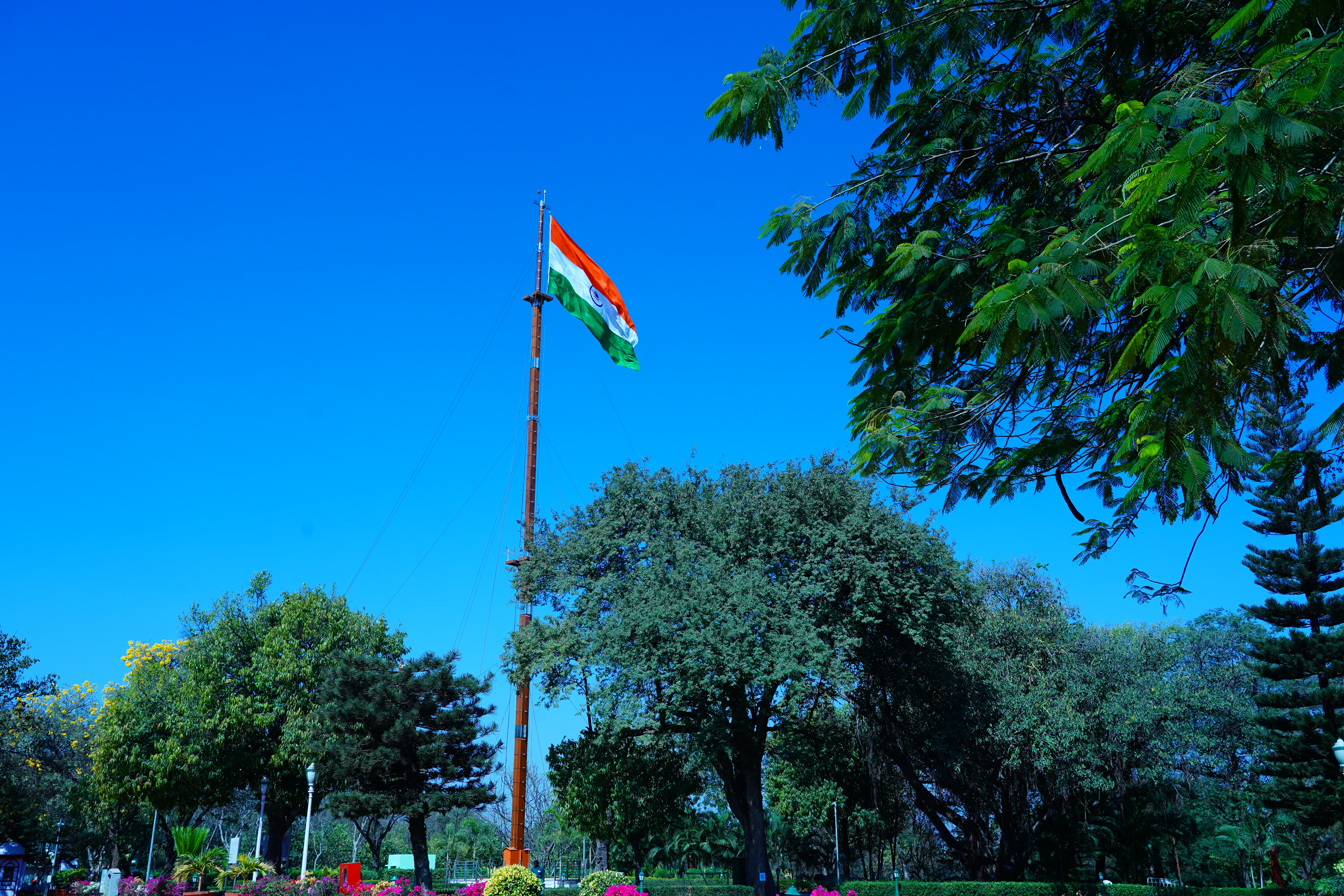
One of its kind 120 ft tall teak wood flag post - replica of the original flag post where the Indian flag was hoisted for the first time in Hyderabad in September 1948

. Draupadi murmu's statue is also located.

=== Flagpost ===
In December 2023, President Droupadi Murmu inaugurated a replica of the historic flag post at the Rashtrapati Nilayam on which the national flag was hoisted for the first time in Hyderabad after the princely state acceded to the Indian Union in 1948. This Flagpost is a one-of-its-kind 120 ft wooden structure made of Burma teak wood. This replaced the old flagpole which was dismantled in 2010 as it became dilapidated and posed a threat to the main building.

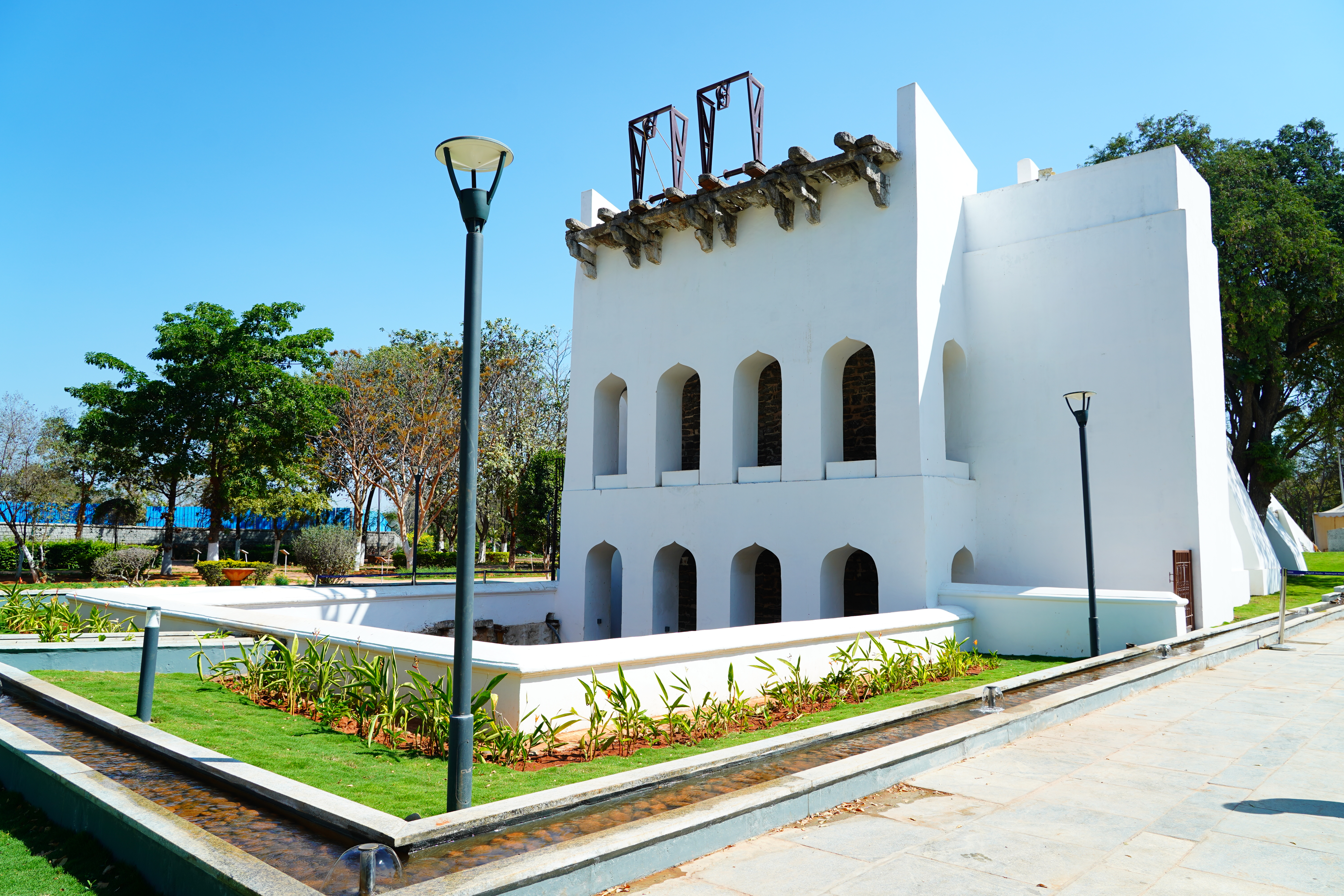
Jai Hind Stepwell - one of the three stepwells revived at Rashtrapati Nilayam

=== Stepwells ===
Smt. Droupadi Murmu inaugurated the revival of traditional water systems in Rashtrapati Nilayam. There are total 3 different 100 year old step wells in the premises of Rashtrapati Nilayam, that have been revived in 2023 - Jai Hind Step Well, Nakshtra Step Well, and Chinna Baavi. An Interpretation Centre has been curated alongside the Jai Hind Stepwell to educate the visitors about the various traditional water management systems of India.

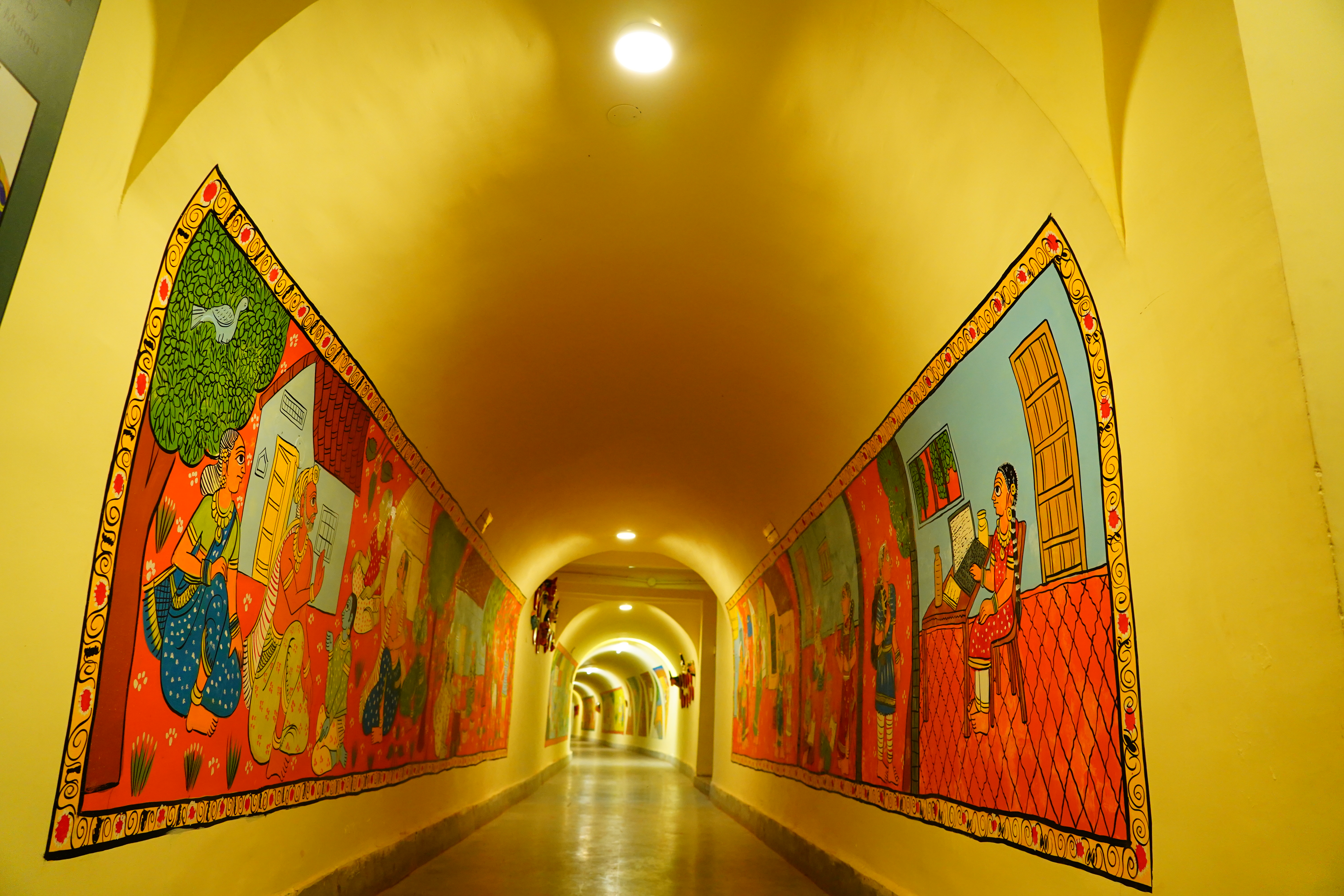
Kitchen Tunnel adorned with local Cheriyal Art paintings

=== Cheriyal Art Tunnel ===
The Kitchen tunnel, once essential as a discreet food passage, was restored in March 2023, and now features Telangana's Cheriyal folk art, emphasising the preservation of cultural heritage.

=== Gardens ===
There are a total of 6 gardens that exist today at Rashtrapati Nilayam - Nakshatra Garden, Herbal Garden, Rock Garden, Maze Garden, Palmatum, and Fruit Orchards.

The Herbal Garden, inaugurated in December 2009, of medicinal and aromatic plants is spread over 7,000 sq metres, has about 116 species of medicinal and aromatic plants including sarpagandha, kalabandha, citronella, lemon grass, khus, geranium, coriander, sandalwood, tuber rose, jasmine, kalmegh, tulsi etc. The garden was built by Central Public Works Department and the Telangana Medicinal Plants Board, while Rashtrapati Bhavan and National Medicinal Plants Board funded the project.

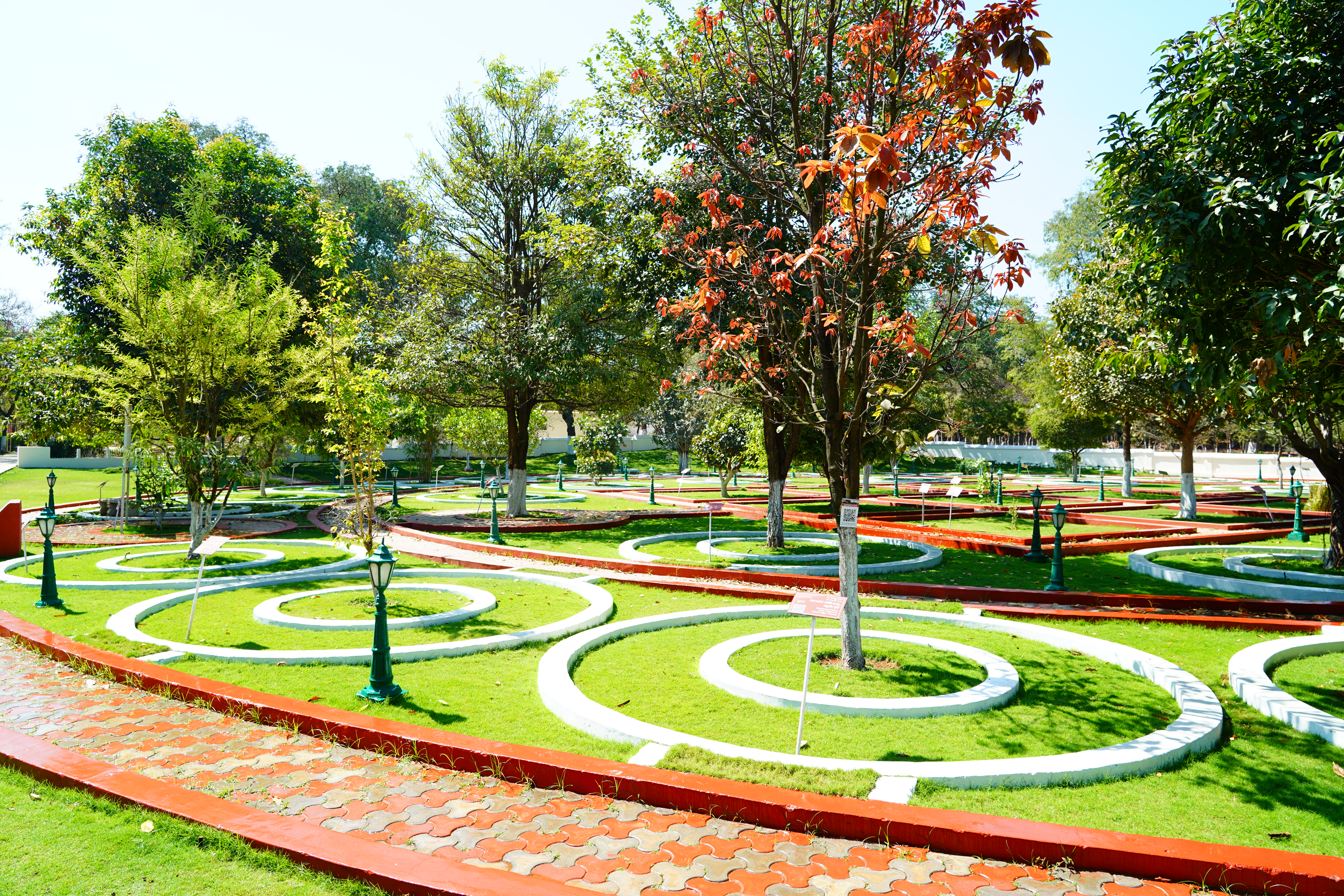
Nakshatra Garden

The Nakshatra Garden showcases the trees associated with various zodiac signs and planets. Additionally, the 90 acre main campus with 33 acres fruit orchards of different varieties – Mango, Chikkoo, Amla, Custard apple, Pomegranate, Guava, Coconut and big tamarind trees are the bio reserves of various fauna. Another feature interesting feature is the Palmatum which is a germplasm repository of 30 species of palms from Rhapis, Areca, Royal, Foxtail, Rhapis, Washingtonia etc.

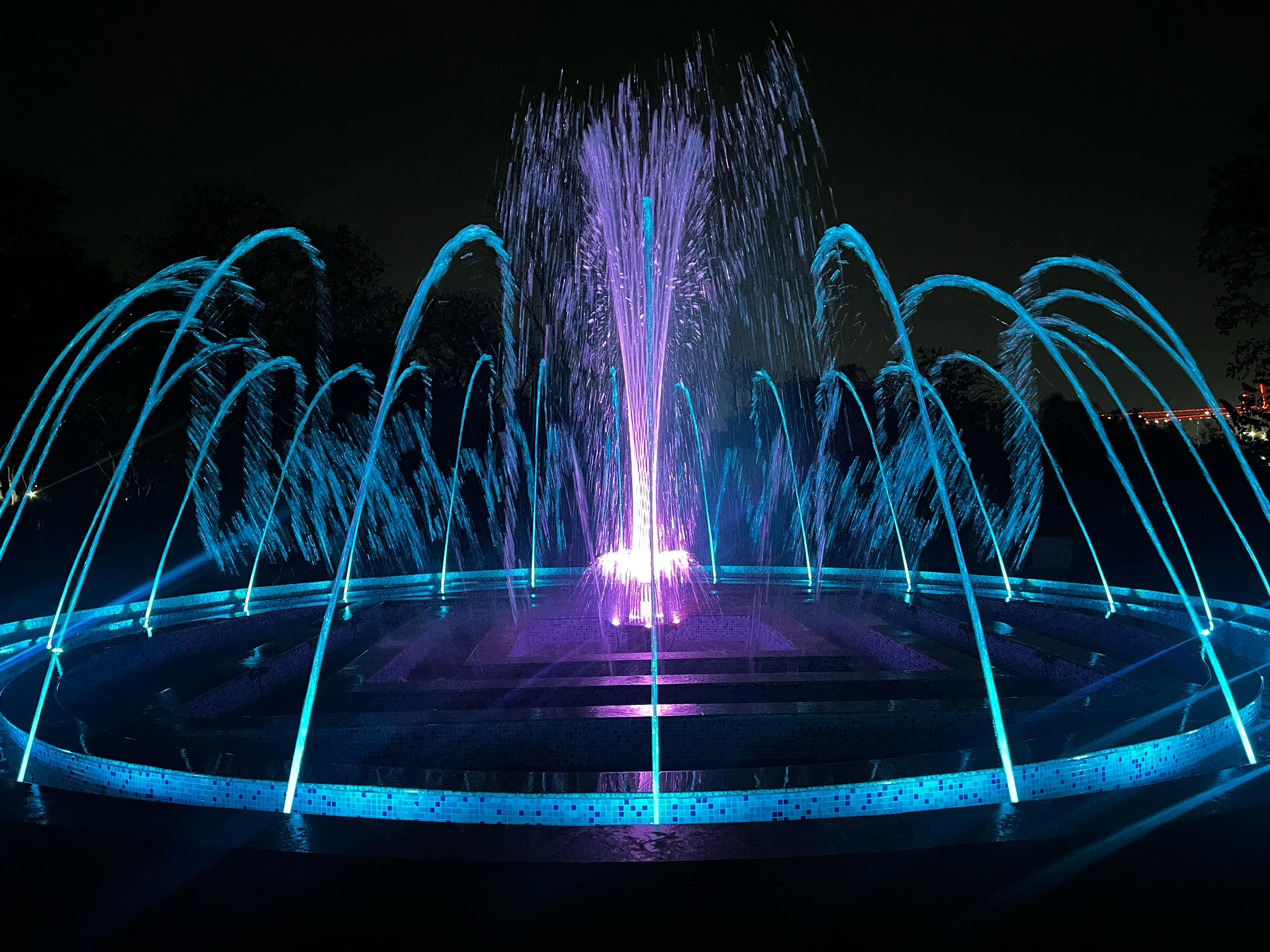
Musical Fountain at the center of Maze Garden

The Rock Garden was created by transforming the natural surroundings of existing rocks into cactus gardens, while also repurposing the boulders to create cascading water features. The Garden also features beautiful rock sculptures of Lord Shiva and Nandi Bull.

The most recent addition to the gardens is the Maze Garden which offers a playful experience to the children visiting the property. At the culmination of the maze, there is a musical fountain which acts a key attractions for young visitors.

== Public access and education ==
It was officially opened to the public in March 2023, allowing visitors to explore its vast grounds, thematic gardens, and architectural marvels. Since its opening to the public, Rashtrapati Nilayam has become a vibrant center for educational tours, interactive exhibitions, and cultural events that celebrate India's heritage.

== Visiting information ==
Rashtrapati Nilayam is open to visitors with guided tours available, offering a comprehensive experience of its historical and cultural significance. For those interested in exploring India's presidential heritage and enjoying a day amidst nature and history, Rashtrapati Nilayam provides an unparalleled opportunity. The tickets can be booked on the official website of Rashtrapati Bhavan for slots between 10 AM to 5 PM from Tuesday to Sunday. Special Slots for Kala Sandhya (Cultural Evenings) are live from 5 to 7 PM on Saturday and Sunday.

== See also ==
- List of official residences of India
- Rashtrapati Bhavan, New Delhi
- Rashtrapati Niwas, Shimla
- Rashtrapati Niketan, Dehradun
