= Lok Bhavan, Nainital =

Government building in Nainital, Uttarakhand, India

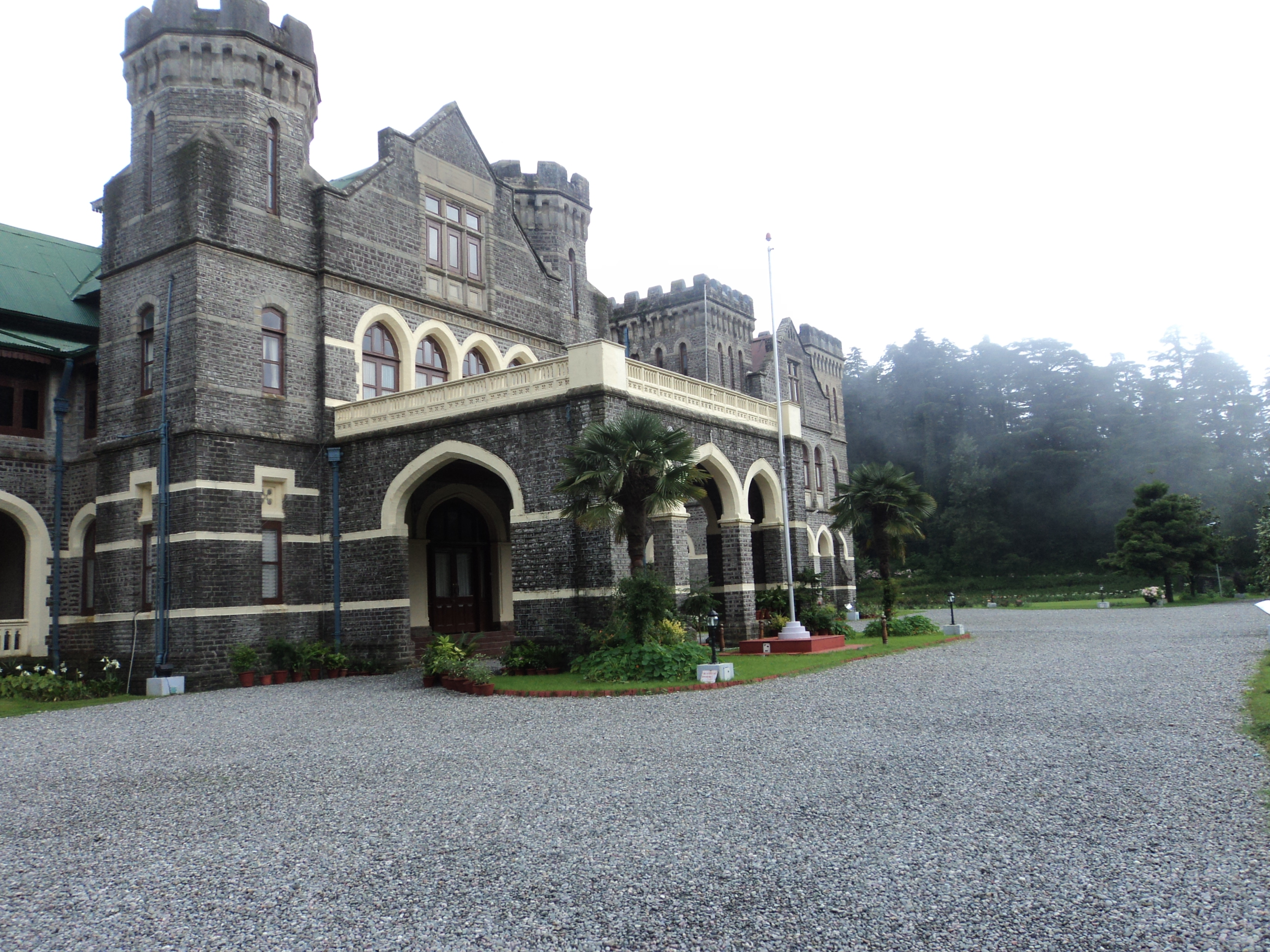
- Lok Bhavan, Nainital
- Interactive map of the Lok Bhavan, Nainital area

General information
- Type: Summer residence
- Coordinates: 29.374°N 79.457°E
- Current tenants: Gurmit Singh
- Completed: 1897
- Owner: Government of Uttarakhand

Technical details
- Floor area: 205 acre

Design and construction
- Architect: Stevens
- Engineer: F. O. W. Ortel

Other information
- Number of rooms: 113

References
- Website; Rajbhavan Nainital

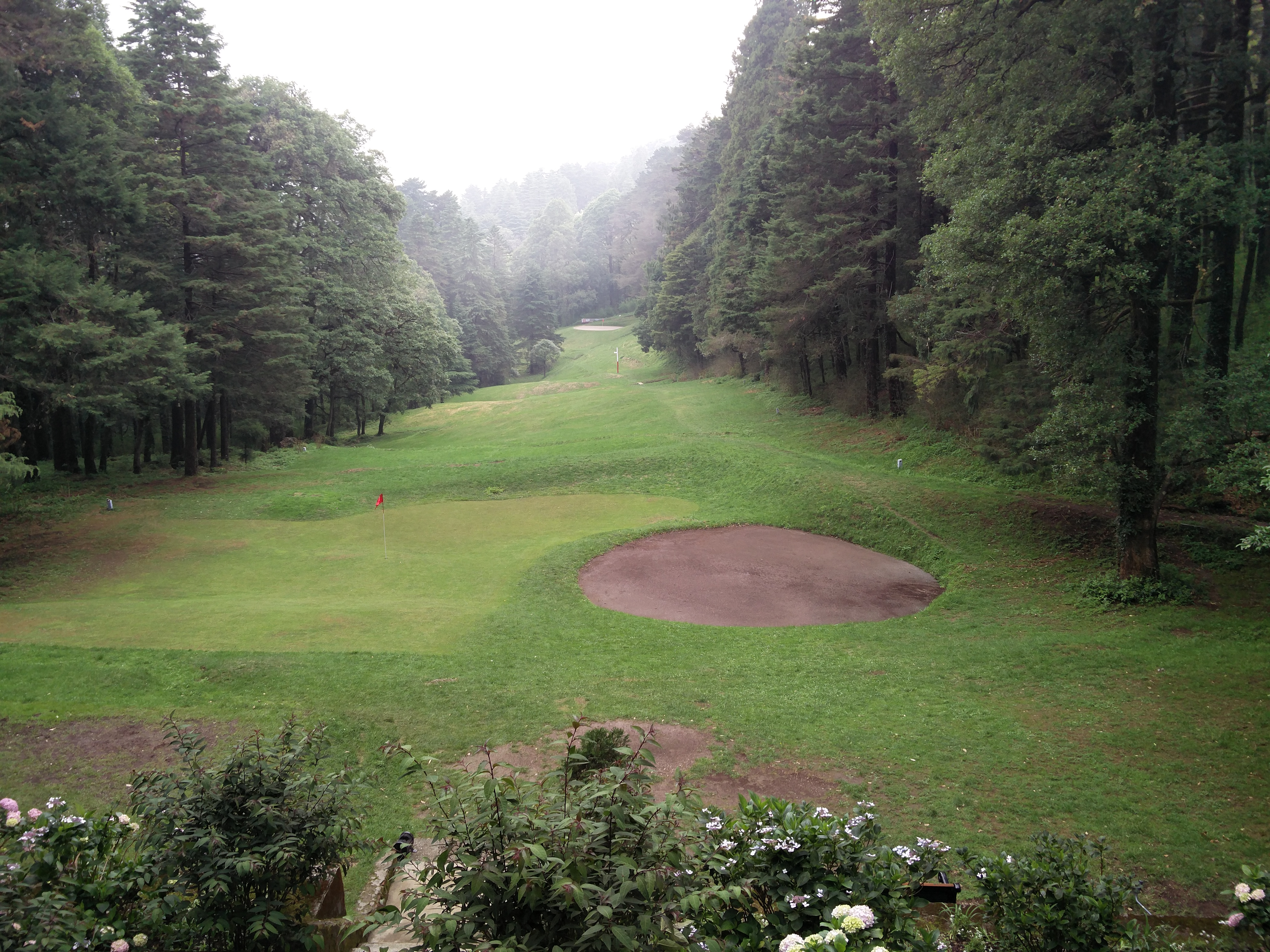
The Golf Course

The Lok Bhavan (formerly Raj Bhavan) or Governor's House of Uttarakhand is located in Nainital. It is the summer retreat of the governor of Uttarakhand. In the pre-Independence era, Nainital served as the summer capital of United Provinces and this building, built like a Scottish castle, was christened as the "Government House". Raj Bhavan was built by the British as the residence of the governor of the North-Western Provinces. The beginning of construction of Raj Bhavan started in April 1897 and took two years to complete. It is built on European pattern and based on Gothic architecture. The designers of Raj Bhavan at Nainital were Architect Stevens and the Executive Engineer F. O. W. Ortel. After independence it was renamed as Raj Bhavan.

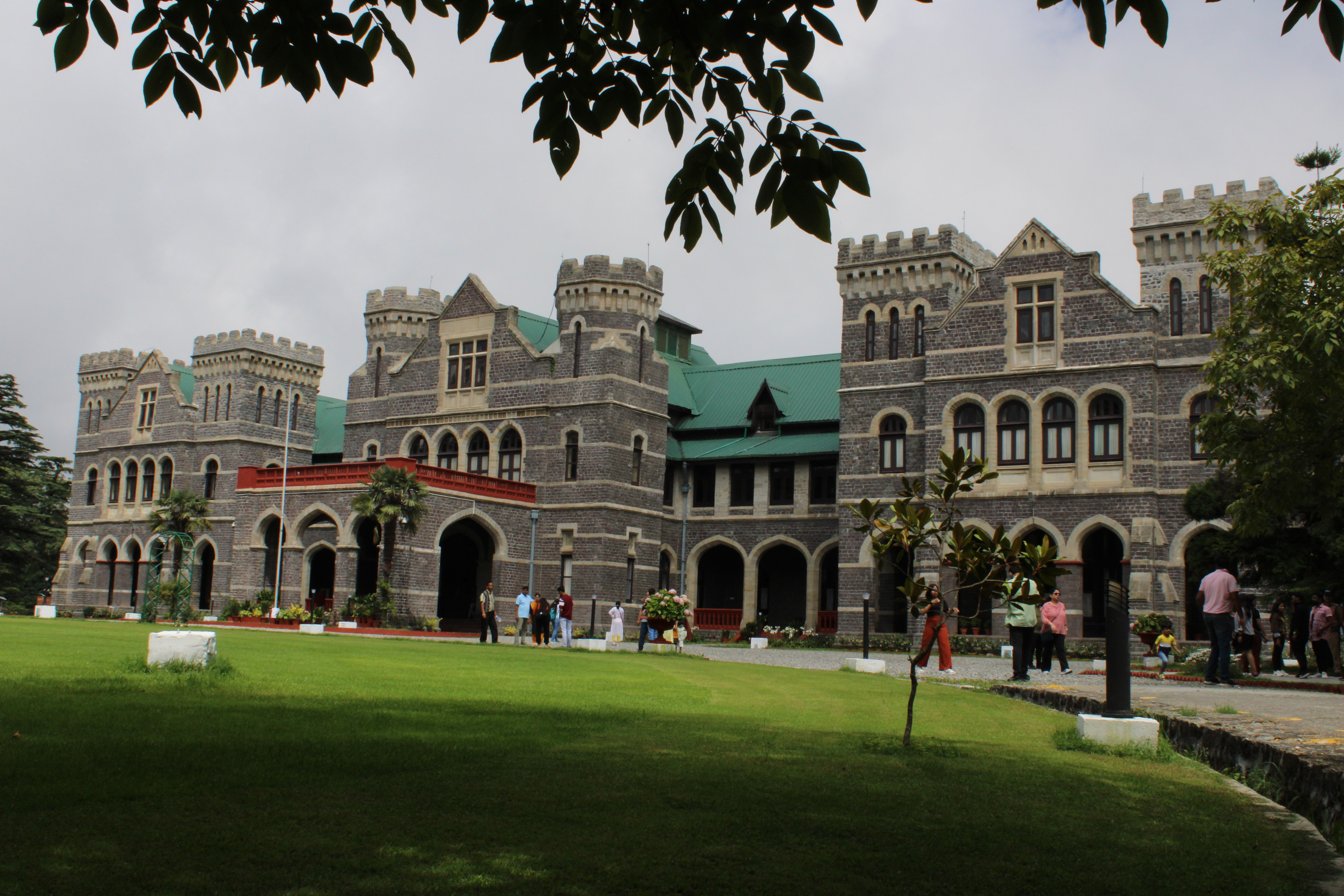
Governor House, Nainital, Uttarakhand, India, it is the summer retreat of the Governor of Uttarakhand.

The Raj Bhavan estate is spread over 220 acre of area with a golf course in 45 acre of land. The golf course of Raj Bhavan, built in 1936, is one of the vintage golf courses in India, and is affiliated to the Indian Golf Union. In the post-independence period, Sarojini Naidu, the first governor of Uttar Pradesh, was the first occupant of this historic monument.

== See also ==
- Raj Bhavan, Dehradun
- Government Houses of the British Indian Empire
