= Lok Bhavan, Dehradun =

1st Residence of the Governor of Uttarakhand

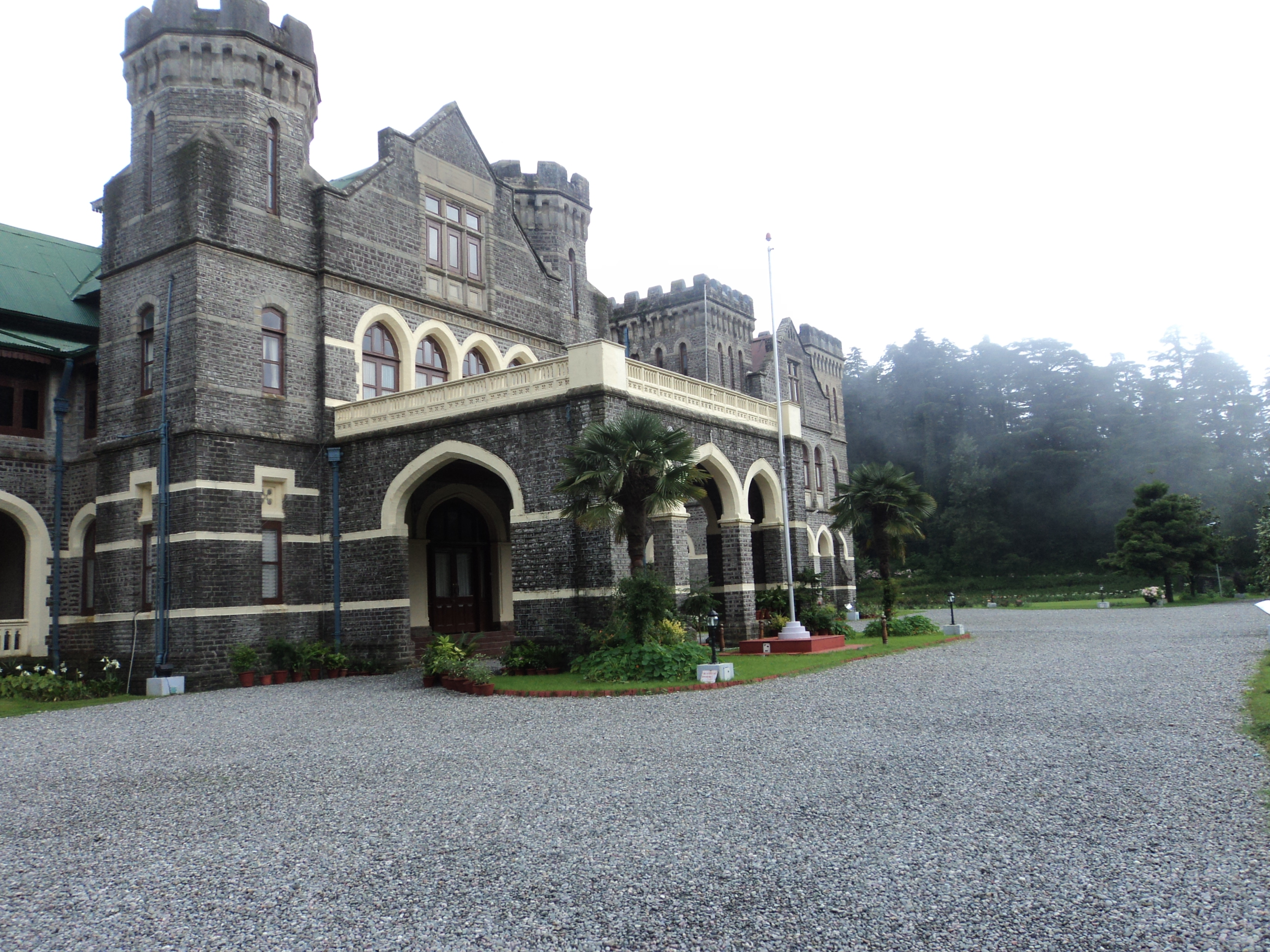

General information
- Type: Main residence
- Coordinates: 30.352921°N 78.044659°E
- Current tenants: Gurmit Singh
- Construction started: 1902
- Owner: Government of Uttarakhand

References
- Website; Rajbhavan Nainital

Lok Bhavan formerly Raj Bhavan, Dehradun or Governor's House, Dehradun is the official residence of the governor of Uttarakhand. Uttarakhand is one of the few Indian states which have two official buildings of Raj Bhavans. The first one is located in the capital city of Dehradun. The second Raj Bhavan of Uttarakhand is located in Nainital.

== History ==
The present Raj Bhavan of Dehradun was built in 1902. Earlier it was known as "Court House", where the then Governor of United Provinces often used to reside.
With the creation of the State of Uttarakhand, the Raj Bhavan was temporarily established at Bijapur House located on New Cantt Road in Dehradun. Subsequently, the Circuit House of Dehradun was re-designated as Raj Bhavan and the first Governor of Uttarakhand, Surjit Singh Barnala, shifted there on 25 December 2000.
In the post-Independence period, India's first Prime Minister, Jawaharlal Nehru used to stay in this building whenever he visited Dehradun. From time to time, various Presidents of India and almost all Indian Prime Ministers, so far, have stayed in this building. The Auditorium of Raj Bhavan is where various important events like oath-taking ceremonies, seminars, book-release functions and cultural programmes etc. are organised.

== See also ==
- Raj Bhavan, Nainital
- Government Houses of the British Indian Empire
