= Shamsher Gazi =

Ruler of Roshnabad and Tripura from 1748 to 1760

Tiger of Bhati Shamsher Ghazi
- শমসের গাজী
- Born: 1712; Kungura, Twipra Kingdom, Bengal Subah (present-day Feni District, Bangladesh)
- Died: c. 1760 (aged 47–48); Agartala, Twipra Kingdom (present-day Tripura, India)
- Cause of death: Cannon execution
- Term: Chakladar of Roshnabad
- Predecessor: Nasir Mahmud
- Successor: Krishna Manikya
- Parents: Peyar Muhammad Khan (father); Kaiyara Bibi (mother)

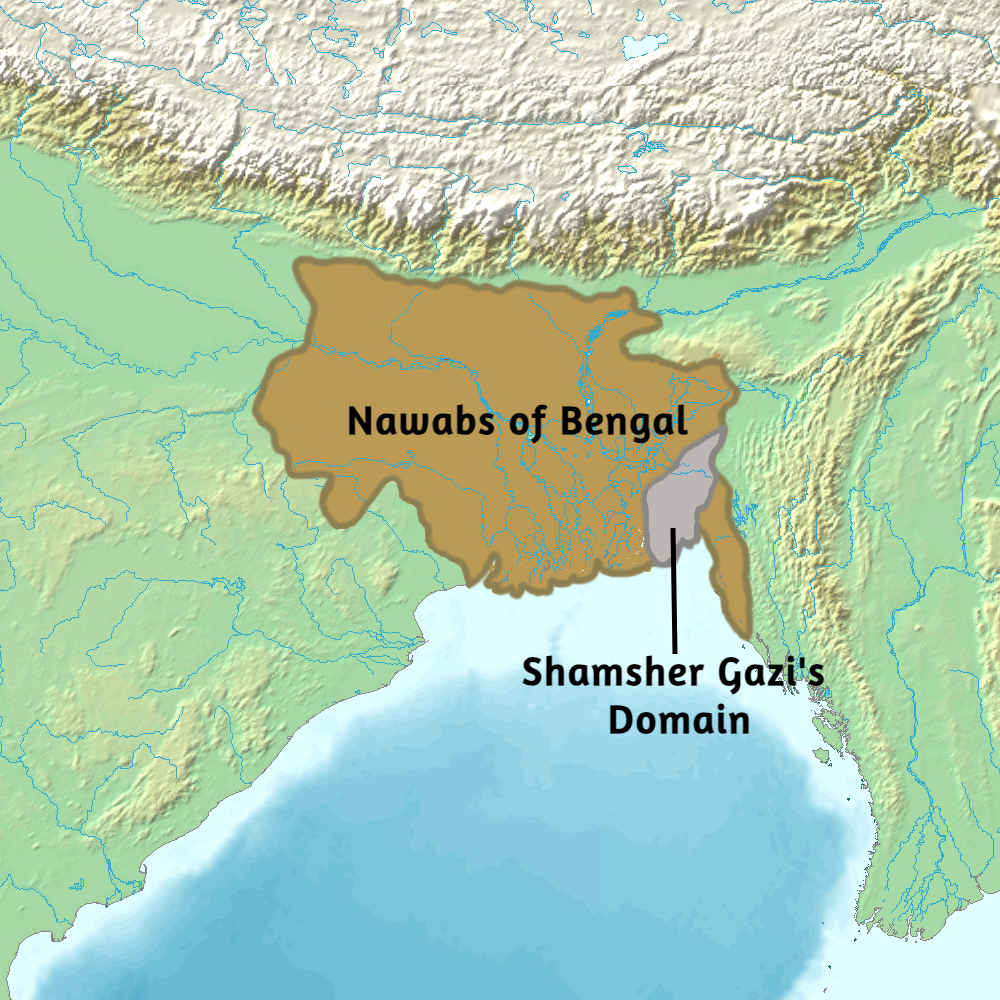
Territory of Shamsher Gazi under his reign of the Twipra Kingdom

Kingdom of Tripura
- Part of History of Tripura
Kings of Tripura
Maha Manikya	c. 1400–1431
Dharma Manikya I	1431–1462
Ratna Manikya I	1462–1487
Pratap Manikya	1487
Vijaya Manikya I	1488
Mukut Manikya	1489
Dhanya Manikya	1490–1515
Dhwaja Manikya	1515–1520
Deva Manikya	1520–1530
Indra Manikya I	1530–1532
Vijaya Manikya II	1532–1563
Ananta Manikya	1563–1567
Udai Manikya I	1567–1573
Joy Manikya I	1573–1577
Amar Manikya	1577–1585
Rajdhar Manikya I	1586–1600
Ishwar Manikya	1600
Yashodhar Manikya	1600–1623
Interregnum	1623–1626
Kalyan Manikya	1626–1660
Govinda Manikya	1660–1661
Chhatra Manikya	1661–1667
Govinda Manikya	1661–1673
Rama Manikya	1673–1685
Ratna Manikya II	1685–1693
Narendra Manikya	1693–1695
Ratna Manikya II	1695–1712
Mahendra Manikya	1712–1714
Dharma Manikya II	1714–1725
Jagat Manikya	1725–1729
Dharma Manikya II	1729
Mukunda Manikya	1729–1739
Joy Manikya II	1739–1744
Indra Manikya II	1744–1746
Udai Manikya II	1744
Joy Manikya II	1746
Vijaya Manikya III	1746–1748
Lakshman Manikya	1740s/1750s
Interregnum	1750s–1760
Krishna Manikya	1760–1783
Rajdhar Manikya II	1785–1806
Rama Ganga Manikya	1806–1809
Durga Manikya	1809–1813
Rama Ganga Manikya	1813–1826
Kashi Chandra Manikya	1826–1829
Krishna Kishore Manikya	1829–1849
Ishan Chandra Manikya	1849–1862
Bir Chandra Manikya	1862–1896
Birendra Kishore Manikya	1909–1923
Bir Bikram Kishore Manikya	1923–1947
Kirit Bikram Kishore Manikya	1947–1949; 1949–1978 (titular)
Kirit Pradyot Manikya	1978–present (titular)

Tripura monarchy data
- Manikya dynasty (Royal family)
- Agartala (Capital of the kingdom)
- Ujjayanta Palace (Royal residence)
- Pushbanta Palace (Royal residence)
- Neermahal (Royal residence)
- Rajmala (Royal chronicle)
- Tripura Buranji (Chronicle)
- Chaturdasa Devata (Family deities)

Shamsher Gazi (Bengali: শমসের গাজী; 1712–1760), also known as the Tiger of Bhati (Bengali: ভাটির বাঘ, romanized: Bhatir Bagh), was a ruler of Roshnabad and Tripura, which covers parts of modern-day Bangladesh and India. (Note: Various other spellings in English such as Shamsher Ghazi and Samsher Gazi) Gazi's reign (1748-1760) has been cited as the "most interesting episode" in Medieval Tripura's history.

== Early life ==
Gazi was born in 1712 into a Bengali Muslim family of farmers in the village of Kungura, located in present-day Chhagalnaiya, Feni. His father was Peyar (other sources say Pir) Muhammad Khan and mother's name was Kaiyara Bibi. From an early age, he began to serve under and be brought up by Nasir Mahmud, a zamindar (landowner) of the Chakla of Raushanabad. Mahmud had become the ruler of Chakla Raushanabad by undertaking to give a monetary recompense to the erstwhile Nawab of Bengal.

== Reign ==
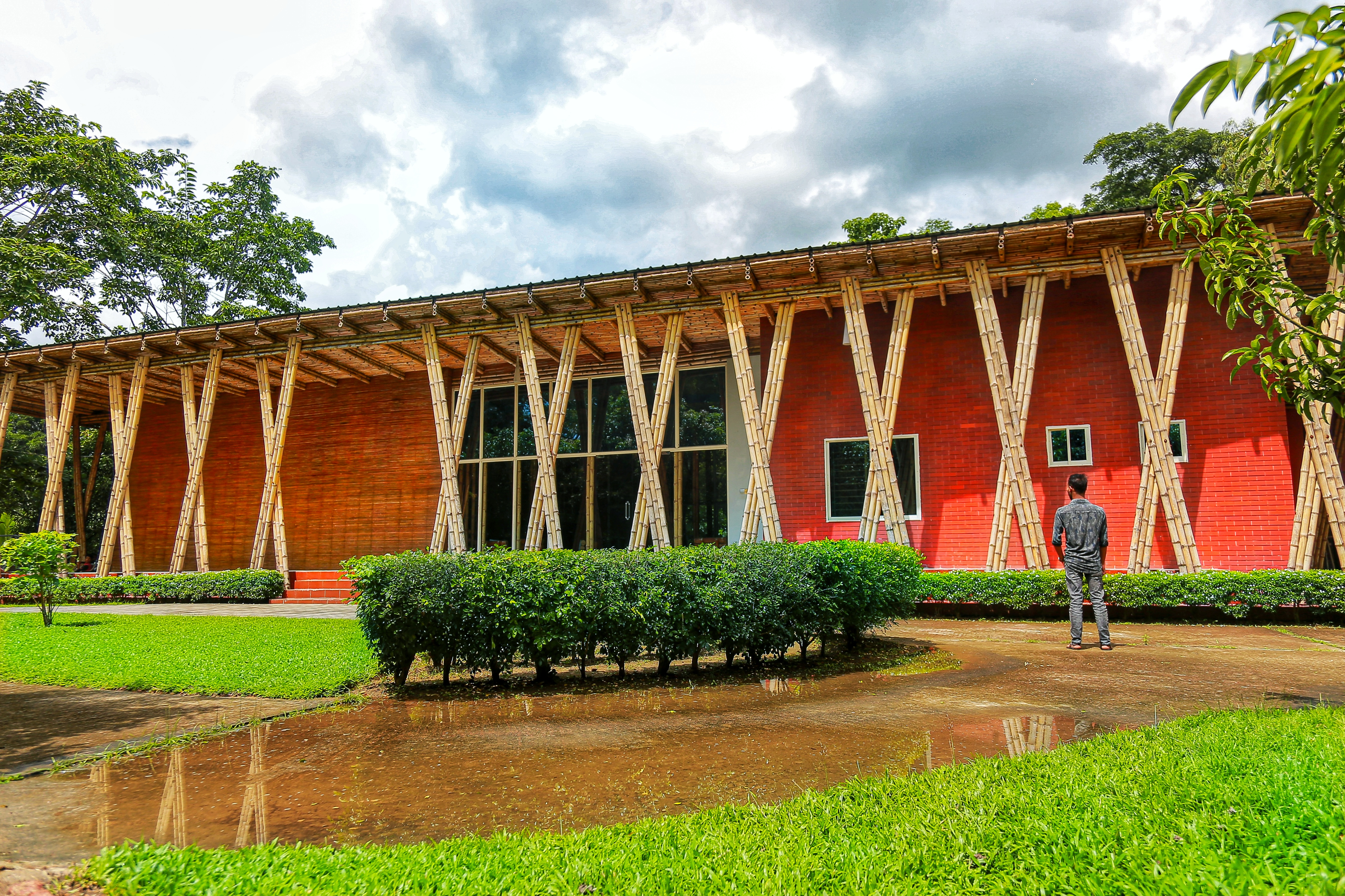
Reinterpreted fort of Shamsher Ghazi at a resort in Southern Chhagalnaiya.

The advent of the British East India Company with its "exploitation and oppression" alongside zamindari subjugation, made life of the peasants and farmers difficult and despondent. Shamsher Gazi's efficient rule freed them of this control. With the granting of rent exemption to the peasants, he managed to govern the economy in an appropriate manner, leading to the reduction of the prices of essential commodities. He was generous to both the Hindus and Muslims. He had ponds dug, naming them after himself, and built many schools in and outside his capital Jagannath Sonapur. 'Kaiyar Sagar' was one of the larger ponds in the area.

Krishna Manikya, brother of Indra Manikya II, twice tried recapturing Udaipur (old Rangamati), the old capital of Tripura, but was defeated by Gazi in 1748. Consolidating his hold on Pargana Dakshinsik and Pargana Meherkul, Shamsher now became the ruler of Tripura. According to Mesbahul Huq's book Purbo Desh, Gazi repelled assaults by the "plundering Moghs and Bargees". Facing opposition from the kingdom's citizens, Gazi placed Udai Manikya's elder brother Banamali Thakur on the throne under the name Lakshman Manikya, though actual power remained with him. This continued for three years, though Lakshman failed to gain the support of the population.

Krishna Manikya, who had fled to Agartala, sought help from Mir Qasim, the Nawab of Bengal. Heeding the outcry, Gazi was arrested by Qasim by subterfuge for his excesses and put to death by a cannon. Referred to as a "notorious plunderer" in the Tippera District, Noakhali and Chittagong areas, the Manikya dynasty regained their kingdom.

== Literatures ==
- Gazinama, also called the Shamsher Gazi Nama, composed in the first part of the 19th century, was the story of Shamser Gazni written by Manohar Saikh.
- Purbo Desh in Bengali, by Mesbahul Huq about the life and exploits of Shamsher Gazni.
- The Ballad of Shamsher- Gazi published by Maulavi Lutfur Khabir of Tipperah.
