= Lokpal Singh =

Raja of Panna (1893 – 1897)

- Maharaja Mahendra

Maharaja of Panna
- Reign: c. 1893 – c. 1897
- Predecessor: Rudra Pratap Singh
- Successor: Madho Singh
- Died: c. 1897
- Issue: Madho Singh
Names
- Lokpal Singh Ju Deo
- House: Panna
- Dynasty: Bundela
- Father: Nirpat Singh

Lokpal Singh was the Maharaja of Panna from 1893 until his death in 1897.

== Biography ==
He was born as the second son of Nirpat Singh. Following the death of his brother, Rudra Pratap Singh, without an heir, he ascended the throne of Panna in 1893. A daughter of his married Raghuraj Singh, Rao of Beri.

He died in 1898 and was succeeded by his son Madho Singh.
