= Yadvendra Singh Judeo =

Maharaja of Panna (1893–1963)

Yadvendra Singh Ju Deo
- Maharaja Mahendra

Maharaja of Panna
- Reign: 20 June 1902 – 4 August 1963
- Investiture: 4 February 1915
- Predecessor: Madho Singh
- Successor: Narendra Singh
- Born: 31 January 1893
- Died: 4 August 1963 (aged 70)
- Wives: Manhar Kunverba (m. 1912); Gopal Kumari (m. 1928)
Names
- Yadvendra Singh Ju Deo
- House: Panna
- Dynasty: Bundela
- Father: Khuman Singh

Colonel Sir Yadvendra Singh Ju Deo KCSI KCIE (31 January 1893 – 4 August 1963) was the Maharaja of Panna from 1902 until his death in 1963.

== Early life and education ==
He was born on 31 January 1893 to Khuman Singh. He received his education at Mayo College in Ajmer. In 1913, after completing his diploma, he joined the Imperial Cadet Corps.

== Reign ==
When his cousin, Madho Singh, was deposed for the murder of Khuman Singh, the choice of a successor to the throne of Panna fell upon him. He was installed on the throne on 20 June 1902. He was 9 years old at the time. Owing to his minority, the administration of the State was vested in a Diwan and a Council. Their work was overseen by the Political Agent. He attended the Delhi Durbar in 1911.

He was invested with full ruling powers on 4 February 1915. As soon as he took office, he looked closely into how each Department of State was working. After the review, he brought in a number of changes to improve how things were run. On 1 March 1921, he was given full hereditary authority to preside over and decide all criminal cases.

He acceded Panna to the Government of India on 1 January 1950, and his state became Panna district of the Indian state of Vindhya Pradesh, which was later merged into Madhya Pradesh. He served as Uparajpramukh of Vindhya Pradesh. He also served as president of Akhil Bharatiya Kshatriya Mahasabha in 1946.

== Personal life ==
He first married on 2 December 1912, to Manhar Kunverba, daughter of Bhavsinhji II, Maharaja of Bhavnagar. Upon her death in 1927, he remarried in 1928 to Gopal Kumari, daughter of the Thakur of Isarda and elder sister of the then Maharaja of Jaipur. He had two sons, Narendra Singh and Pushpendra Singh, and six daughters. Kanchan Prava Devi, his eldest daughter, married into the royal family of Tripura and was the regent of the state of Tripura until it merged with India in 1949.

== Death ==
He died on 4 August 1963 and was succeeded by Narendra Singh as the Maharaja of Panna.

== Honours ==
He was made a Knight Commander of the Order of the Indian Empire in January 1922. Ten years later, in January 1932, he was also appointed Knight Commander of the Order of the Star of India.
