= Lokendra Singh Judeo =

Indian royal and politician

- Maharaj of Panna
- Born: 16 December 1946 (age 79)
- Died: 26 January 2021 (aged 74)
- Spouse: Indira Kumari (m. 1967)
- Issue: Kamaksha Kumari; Sulakshana Kumari
- House: Panna
- Dynasty: Bundela
- Father: Narendra Singh Judeo
- Mother: Durga Rajya Lakshmi Devi
- Education: Indore Christian College

Lokendra Singh Judeo (or simply Lokendra Singh) was a member of the Panna royal family and an Indian politician.

== Biography ==
He was born on 16 December 1946 to Narendra Singh Judeo, the Mahendra Maharaja of Panna, and his wife, Durga Rajya Lakshmi Devi, daughter of Maharajkumar Singha Shamsher Jang Bahadur Rana of Lamjang and Kaski. He was educated at Indore Christian College.

His father, in the late 1980s, entrusted him with the electoral responsibilities of his work. In 1977, he contested the general elections for the Panna seat in the Madhya Pradesh Legislative Assembly as the candidate of the Janata Party. He won the seat with 29,640 votes. In 1993, he contested the general elections for the Panna seat in the Madhya Pradesh Legislative Assembly as the Janata Party candidate and won with 30,615 votes. In 1989, he contested the general elections for the 9th Lok Sabha from Damoh as a candidate of the Bharatiya Janata Party. He won the seat by securing 307,872 votes. In the 1970s, despite the Wildlife (Protection) Act of 1972, there were no strong local laws in Panna to protect wildlife. This led to poaching, illegal killings, and wildlife trading. Concerned about this, he met with Indira Gandhi and suggested that the protected land of Panna be designated as a National Park. She agreed and passed the idea on to Arjun Singh. Lokendra was appointed chairman of the committee that helped establish the park, and on 25 October 1981, Panna National Park was officially created. When he turned 73, he retired from politics.

He married Indira Kumari on 3 June 1967. He had two daughters, Kamaksha Kumari and Sulakshana Kumari. Kamaksha married Preetendra Singh of Nagod, while Sulakshana married Rudramani Kant Singh of Bhinga.

He died on 26 January 2021.
