= Rudra Pratap Singh (ruler) =

Maharaja of Panna from 1870 to 1893

- Maharaja Mahendra

Maharaja of Panna
- Reign: 9 June 1870 – 8 November 1893
- Predecessor: Nirpat Singh
- Successor: Lokpal Singh
- Born: 10 July 1848
- Died: 8 November 1893 (aged 45)
- House: Panna
- Dynasty: Bundela
- Father: Nirpat Singh

Sir Rudra Pratap Singh KCSI was the Maharaja of Panna from 1870 until his death in 1893.

== Biography ==
He was born on 10 July 1848 to Nirpat Singh. He succeeded his father as Maharaja of Panna on 9 June 1870. On 1 January 1876, he was invested in Calcutta by Edward VII, then Prince of Wales, with the insignia of a Knight Commander of the Order of the Star of India. He attended the Delhi Durbar of 1877, where his personal salute was increased by two guns. He was also presented with a banner and a medal. He appointed an English architect to build the Baldeoji Temple in Panna on the design of St. Paul's Cathedral. The same architect built Panna Palace for him in 1886.

He died on 8 November 1893. Since he left behind no heirs, his brother, Lokpal Singh, succeeded to his title, rank, and dignity.
