= Harbans Rai =

Raja of Panna (1834 – 1849)

- Raja

Raja of Panna
- Reign: c. 1834 – c. 1849
- Predecessor: Kishor Singh
- Successor: Nirpat Singh
- Died: c. 1849
- House: Panna
- Dynasty: Bundela
- Father: Kishor Singh

Harbans Rai (or Harbans Singh) was the Raja of Panna from 1834 until his death in 1849.

== Biography ==
He was born to Kishor Singh and, following his father’s disposition and expulsion from Panna, was appointed by the British government as regent to administer state affairs in his stead. Following his father's death in 1834, he succeeded him as the Raja of Panna. He died in 1849 without an heir and was succeeded by his brother, Nirpat Singh, as the ruler of Panna.
