= Twipra Kingdom =

Historic kingdom in India

Kingdom of Tripura
- c. 1400–15 October 1949
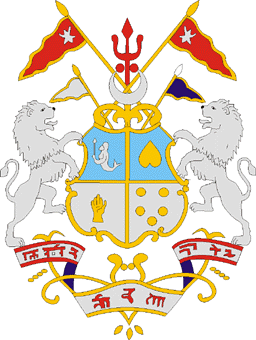
- Coat of arms

- Location of the Tripura kingdom and neighbouring South Asian polities circa 1500 CE.
- Status: historical kingdom
- Capital: Udaipur; Agartala
- Common languages: Kokborok; Bengali
- Religion: Hinduism, Buddhism
- Government: Hereditary monarchy
- History
  - Established by Maha Manikya: c. 1400
  - Reorganisation under Ratna Manikya I: c. 1460
  - Joined Indian Union: 15 October 1949
Preceded by	Succeeded by
Paṭṭikera	Tripura (princely state)
- Today part of: India; Bangladesh; Myanmar

Kingdom of Tripura
- Part of History of Tripura
Kings of Tripura
Maha Manikya	c. 1400–1431
Dharma Manikya I	1431–1462
Ratna Manikya I	1462–1487
Pratap Manikya	1487
Vijaya Manikya I	1488
Mukut Manikya	1489
Dhanya Manikya	1490–1515
Dhwaja Manikya	1515–1520
Deva Manikya	1520–1530
Indra Manikya I	1530–1532
Vijaya Manikya II	1532–1563
Ananta Manikya	1563–1567
Udai Manikya I	1567–1573
Joy Manikya I	1573–1577
Amar Manikya	1577–1585
Rajdhar Manikya I	1586–1600
Ishwar Manikya	1600
Yashodhar Manikya	1600–1623
Interregnum	1623–1626
Kalyan Manikya	1626–1660
Govinda Manikya	1660–1661
Chhatra Manikya	1661–1667
Govinda Manikya	1661–1673
Rama Manikya	1673–1685
Ratna Manikya II	1685–1693
Narendra Manikya	1693–1695
Ratna Manikya II	1695–1712
Mahendra Manikya	1712–1714
Dharma Manikya II	1714–1725
Jagat Manikya	1725–1729
Dharma Manikya II	1729
Mukunda Manikya	1729–1739
Joy Manikya II	1739–1744
Indra Manikya II	1744–1746
Udai Manikya II	1744
Joy Manikya II	1746
Vijaya Manikya III	1746–1748
Lakshman Manikya	1740s/1750s
Interregnum	1750s–1760
Krishna Manikya	1760–1783
Rajdhar Manikya II	1785–1806
Rama Ganga Manikya	1806–1809
Durga Manikya	1809–1813
Rama Ganga Manikya	1813–1826
Kashi Chandra Manikya	1826–1829
Krishna Kishore Manikya	1829–1849
Ishan Chandra Manikya	1849–1862
Bir Chandra Manikya	1862–1896
Radha Kishore Manikya	1896–1909
Birendra Kishore Manikya	1909–1923
Bir Bikram Kishore Manikya	1923–1947
Kirit Bikram Kishore Manikya	1947–1949; 1949–1978 (titular)
Kirit Pradyot Manikya	1978–present (titular)

Tripura monarchy data
- Manikya dynasty (Royal family)
- Agartala (Capital of the kingdom)
- Ujjayanta Palace (Royal residence)
- Pushbanta Palace (Royal residence)
- Neermahal (Royal residence)
- Rajmala (Royal chronicle)
- Tripura Buranji (Chronicle)
- Chaturdasa Devata (Family deities)

The Twipra Kingdom (Sanskrit: Tripura), anglicized as Tipperah, was one of the largest historical kingdoms of the Tripuri people in Northeast India.

== Legend ==
A list of legendary Tripuri kings is given in the Rajmala chronicle, a 15th-century chronicle in Bengali written by the court pandits of Dharma Manikya I (r. 1431). The chronicle traces the king's ancestry to the mythological Lunar Dynasty. Druhyu, the son of Yayati, became king of the land of Kirata and constructed a city named Trivega on the bank of Kapila river. His kingdom was bounded by the river Tairang on the north, Acaranga on the south, Mekhali on the east, Koch and Vanga (Bengal) on the west. The daughter of the King of Hedamba was married to King Trilochona of Trivega. The King of Hedamba, having no heir, made the eldest son of Trilochona the king of his land. After the death of Trilochona, his second son Daksina became King of Tripura. Daksina shared the wealth of the kingdom among his eleven brothers. Being the eldest son of Trilochona, the King of Hedamba demanded his kingdom from his brothers. In denial, the enraged King of Hedamba attacked Tripura and destroyed the capital. The eleven brothers left Trivega and moved to Khalangma on the bank of river Varavakra and found the capital Khalangma. In the 8th century, the kingdom shifted its capital eastwards along the Surma river in Sylhet, near the present-day town of Kailasahar in northern Tripura.

The religion of the Tipra had 14 deities known as Chaturdasa Devata and is still preserved in the Chaturdasha Temple in Agartala, which is maintained by the Tipra priests known as Chantais, who oversee the festivals of the Kharchi and Ker according to traditions.

== History ==
=== Chinese chronicles ===
Twipra is mentioned in Ming Shilu as Di-wu-la. By the early 15th century, its territory was occupied by Da Gu-la, an unidentified state.

=== Cheitharol Kumbaba ===
In Cheitharol Kumbaba chronicles of Manipur, Tripura is referred to as Takhen.

=== Islamic-invasions era ===
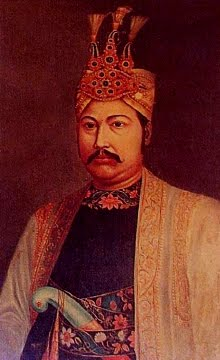
Bir Chandra Manikya of Manikya dynasty

The earliest historical records concerning the Twipra kingdom appears in the 15th century, when it first came under pressure from the Islamic invaders. This is also the time of origin of the Manikya Dynasty, when Chhengthung Fa adopted the title Manikya, becoming Maha Manikya, with the cognomen being held by all Kings of Tripura until the death of Bir Bikram Kishore Manikya in 1947. Under Ratna Manikya I, the capital shifted to Rangamati on the banks of the river Gomati, now in South Tripura.

Tripura was one of the states that pushed back successive waves of invasions from Turks, Afghans, and Mughals. On many occasions, Tripuris (Tiprasa) also pushed back Burmese and Arakanese invasions from the East. At its height it comprised what is now Tripura, Sylhet Division of Bangladesh, Cachar region of Assam state and the Chittagong Hill Tracts of what is now Bangladesh, and even managed to remain free and independent before the British takeover.

The plains of Tripura, however, fell to the attacks from Mughals. The plains territories comprise today's South-East Dhaka and Comilla areas. While the plains areas were thus Islamized, the Hills of Tripura served as a continuous bulwark against penetration to the East. The Tripura Hill Kings were major sponsors of Hindu traditions and customs. In the modern age, they are remembered as one of the longest and most stable dynasties from the Indian East.

Dhanya Manikya (reigned 1463 to 1515) expanded Twipra's territorial domain well into Eastern Bengal. Rangamati was renamed Udaipur after Udai Manikya. The kingdom flourished in the 16th and 17th centuries with kings such as Govinda Manikya putting up a strong defence against the pressure of the Muslim kingdoms to the west. However, the plains areas fell away from Tripura state due to the actions of a renegade Tripuri prince who was backed by Mughal governors of Eastern Bengal plains. After this, plains Twipra became a separate Mughal client kingdom, with the Mughal rulers exerting influence on the appointment of its kings. However, the Mughals could never penetrate the Hills territories to the east.

=== British India ===
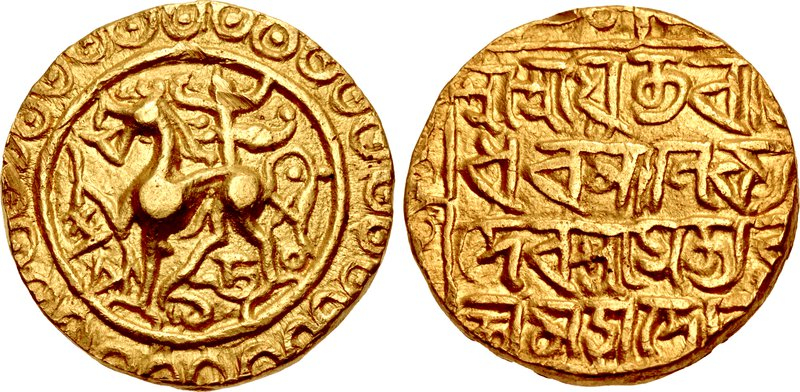
Coinage of Rajadhara Manikya (1586–1599 CE), king of Tripura.

The princely state of Tripura existed outside British India, in a subsidiary alliance with it, and was a self-governing area known as Hill Tippera, the present-day state of Tripura. However, the kings retained an estate known as Tippera district of the British Bengal Presidency or Chakla Roshanbad, which after the partition of India became part of the greater Comilla region of Bangladesh.

Bir Chandra Manikya (1862–1896) modelled his administration on the pattern of British India, and enacted reforms including the formation of Agartala Municipal Corporation. The last king was Kirit Bikram Kishore, son of Bir Bikram Kishore Manikya Debbarman, who ruled for two years, 1947–1949. In 1949, Tripura became part of the Republic of India. The Tripuri "heir apparent" is Kirat Pradyot Kishore Manikya Debbarma (born 1978), the son of the last king, who is sometimes given the courtesy title of "Maharaja".

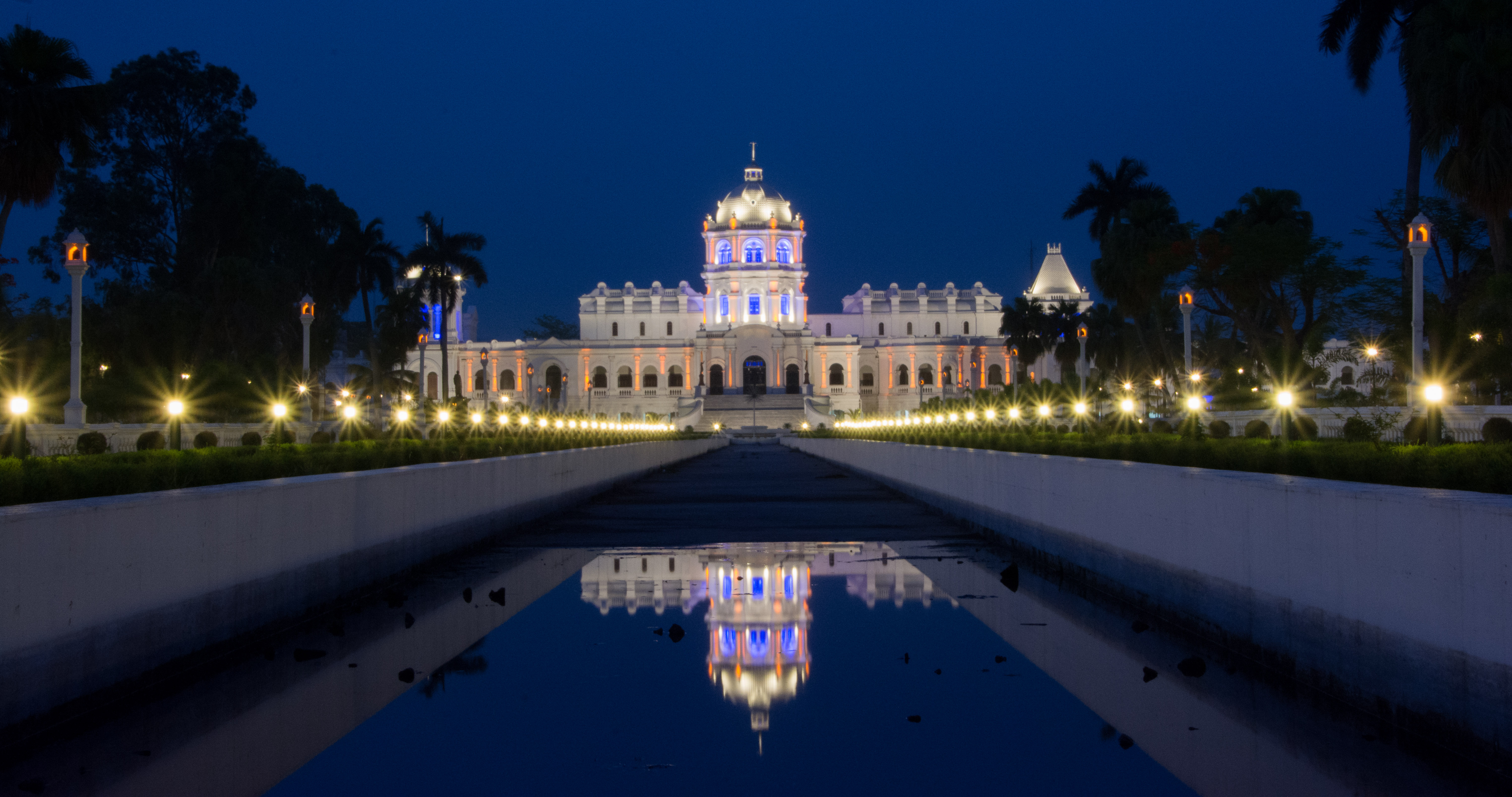
Ujjayanta Palace served as the royal seat of Twipra Kingdom from 1901.

== Geography ==
The present political areas which were part of the Twipra Kingdom are:

- Barak Valley (Cachar Plains), Hailakandi and Karimganj in present-day Assam
- Comilla, Sylhet and the Chittagong Hill Tracts in Bangladesh
- The present-day states of Tripura

The Twipra Kingdom in all its various ages comprised the areas with the borders:

1. The Khasi Hills in the North
2. The Manipur Hills in the North-East
3. The Arakan Hills of Burma in the East
4. The Bay of Bengal to the South
5. The Brahmaputra River to the West

== Historical significance and legacy ==
Tripura is considered one of the oldest princely states in India, with its rulers claiming descent from the Lunar Dynasty of the Mahabharata. This ancient lineage underscores the kingdom's deep-rooted historical significance.

The cultural heritage of the Kingdom of Tripura includes the worship of the Chaturdasa Devata also known as Chibrwi Mwtai (Fourteen Gods) which is spiritual heritage blending Hinduism and Indigenous practices and The Tripura Sundari Temple which is dedicated to the goddess Tripura Sundari which holds immense religious significance. Festivals like Kharchi puja and unique dances like Hojagiri reflect the region's vibrant traditions.

Tripura has a significant Buddhist heritage, especially as a center for Tantric Buddhism from the 8th century onwards. Tantric Buddhism, or Vajrayana, focused on esoteric practices and rituals aimed at enlightenment. The region was influenced by figures like Virupa, a key figure in tantric teachings. Archaeological sites like Pilak have uncovered Buddhist artifacts, highlighting Tripura's role in the spread of Buddhist art and culture.

== See also ==
- History of Tripura
- Tripura (princely state)
- Tripuri people
