= Madho Singh (ruler) =

Maharaja of Panna (1898 – 1902)

- Maharaja Mahendra

Maharaja of Panna
- Reign: c. 1898 – c. 1902
- Predecessor: Lokpal Singh
- Successor: Yadvendra Singh
Names
- Madho Singh Ju Deo
- House: Panna
- Dynasty: Bundela
- Father: Lokpal Singh

Madho Singh was the maharaja of Panna from 1892 until his deposition in 1902.

== Biography ==
Upon the death of his father, Lokpal Singh, in 1897, he succeeded him as the maharaja of Panna. When his uncle, Khuman Singh, died under suspicious circumstances on 25 June 1901, an inquiry was conducted into the cause of his death. The findings revealed that Khuman had been poisoned, either at Madho's instigation or with his connivance. As a result, Madho was removed from the seat of government, and a commission was appointed by the Government of India to examine the case in greater detail. This commission consisted of two judges assigned to handle the matter, and the Government of India sanctioned Rs. 30,000 for his defense. A court similar to the Indian Criminal Court convened at Panna, where Madho was tried along with four other accomplices. The commissioners found that Madho had a motive to kill his uncle and submitted their report, along with a memorial from Madho’s counsel, to the Government of India. The Viceroy and Governor-General of India concurred with the commission’s judgment and proposed that Madho be deposed and placed under surveillance on a fixed allowance. Consequently, he was deposed in 1902 and succeeded by Yadvendra Singh.
