= Narendra Singh Judeo =

Maharaja of Panna (1963 – 1998) and Indian politician

- Mahendra Maharaja
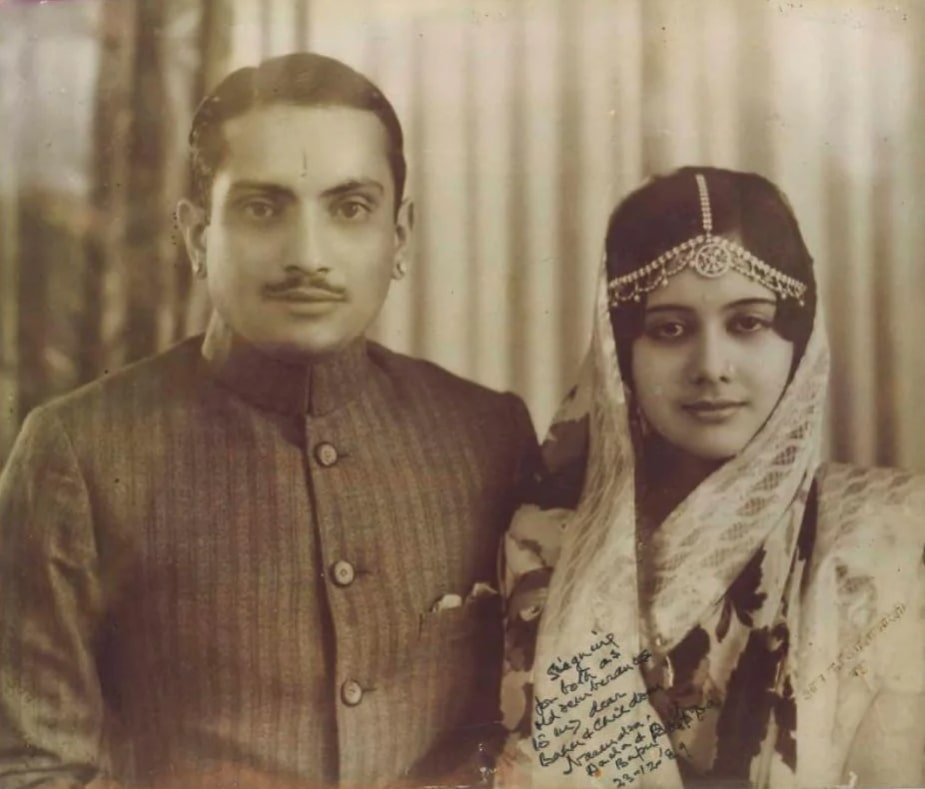
- Singh with his wife

Maharaja of Panna
- Reign: 4 August 1963 – c. 1998
- Predecessor: Yadvendra Singh
- Successor: Manvendra Singh
- Born: 29 May 1915
- Died: c. 1998
- Spouse: Durga Rajya Lakshmi Devi
- Issue: Manvendra Singh; Lokendra Singh
- House: Panna
- Dynasty: Bundela
- Father: Yadvendra Singh
- Mother: Manhar Kunverba
- Education: Mayo College

Member of the Madhya Pradesh Legislative Assembly
- In office 1957–1962
- Succeeded by: Jagsuriya
- Constituency: Pawai
- In office 1962–1967
- Preceded by: Devendra Vijay Singh
- Succeeded by: Het Ram Dubey
- Constituency: Panna

Member of Parliament, Lok Sabha
- In office 1977–1979
- Preceded by: Varah Giri Shanker Giri
- Succeeded by: Prabhunarayan Ramdhan
- Constituency: Damoh

Major Narendra Singh Judeo (sometimes Narendra Singh Judev) was an Indian politician and the Maharaja of Panna from 1963 until his death in 1998.

== Biography ==
He was born on 29 May 1915 as the eldest son of Yadvendra Singh Judeo, the Maharaja of Panna, and his wife, Manhar Kunverba, daughter of the Maharaja of Bhavnagar. He was educated at Mayo College, Ajmer, and served as President of the Mayo College Old Boys' Society from 1950 to 1952. He served in the state forces and was on active duty during World War II. Upon the death of his father on 4 August 1963, he succeeded him as the Maharaja of Panna and was officially recognized by the Government of India on 2 September 1963. However, in 1971, when the Parliament of India enacted the 26th Amendment to the Constitution of India, he ceased to enjoy his pensions, titles, and privileges.

In 1957, he contested the elections to the Madhya Pradesh Legislative Assembly from Pawai as a candidate of the Indian National Congress. He won the seat by securing 16,501 votes. In 1962, he again contested the Madhya Pradesh Legislative Assembly elections, this time from Panna, as an Indian National Congress candidate. He won the seat by securing 12,966 votes. During the Emergency, he was imprisoned in the District Jail in Jabalpur. When Vijaya Raje Scindia decided to support the Janata Party during the 1977 general elections to the 6th Lok Sabha, Narendra, who was close to her, contested the election from the Damoh seat as a Janata Party candidate and won.

Personal life

He married Durga Rajya Lakshmi Devi, daughter of Maharajkumar Singha Shamsher Jang Bahadur Rana of Lamjung and Kaski. He had two sons and one daughter. His sons were Manvendra Singh and Lokendra Singh.
