= Ishwar Manikya =

Maharaja of Tripura
- Reign: 1600
- Predecessor: Rajdhar Manikya I
- Successor: Yashodhar Manikya
- Wives: Ishwari Mahadevi; Ishwari Mahadevi
- House: Manikya dynasty
- Religion: Hinduism

Kingdom of Tripura
- Part of History of Tripura
Kings of Tripura
Maha Manikya	c. 1400–1431
Dharma Manikya I	1431–1462
Ratna Manikya I	1462–1487
Pratap Manikya	1487
Vijaya Manikya I	1488
Mukut Manikya	1489
Dhanya Manikya	1490–1515
Dhwaja Manikya	1515–1520
Deva Manikya	1520–1530
Indra Manikya I	1530–1532
Vijaya Manikya II	1532–1563
Ananta Manikya	1563–1567
Udai Manikya I	1567–1573
Joy Manikya I	1573–1577
Amar Manikya	1577–1585
Rajdhar Manikya I	1586–1600
Ishwar Manikya	1600
Yashodhar Manikya	1600–1623
Interregnum	1623–1626
Kalyan Manikya	1626–1660
Govinda Manikya	1660–1661
Chhatra Manikya	1661–1667
Govinda Manikya	1661–1673
Rama Manikya	1673–1685
Ratna Manikya II	1685–1693
Narendra Manikya	1693–1695
Ratna Manikya II	1695–1712
Mahendra Manikya	1712–1714
Dharma Manikya II	1714–1725
Jagat Manikya	1725–1729
Dharma Manikya II	1729
Mukunda Manikya	1729–1739
Joy Manikya II	1739–1744
Indra Manikya II	1744–1746
Udai Manikya II	1744
Joy Manikya II	1746
Vijaya Manikya III	1746–1748
Lakshman Manikya	1740s/1750s
Interregnum	1750s–1760
Krishna Manikya	1760–1783
Rajdhar Manikya II	1785–1806
Rama Ganga Manikya	1806–1809
Durga Manikya	1809–1813
Rama Ganga Manikya	1813–1826
Kashi Chandra Manikya	1826–1829
Krishna Kishore Manikya	1829–1849
Ishan Chandra Manikya	1849–1862
Bir Chandra Manikya	1862–1896
Radha Kishore Manikya	1896–1909
Birendra Kishore Manikya	1909–1923
Bir Bikram Kishore Manikya	1923–1947
Kirit Bikram Kishore Manikya	1947–1949; 1949–1978 (titular)
Kirit Pradyot Manikya	1978–present (titular)

Tripura monarchy data
- Manikya dynasty (Royal family)
- Agartala (Capital of the kingdom)
- Ujjayanta Palace (Royal residence)
- Pushbanta Palace (Royal residence)
- Neermahal (Royal residence)
- Rajmala (Royal chronicle)
- Tripura Buranji (Chronicle)
- Chaturdasa Devata (Family deities)

Ishwar Manikya was briefly the Maharaja of Tripura at the close of the 16th century.

It is believed that in the aftermath of the death of Rajdhar Manikya I in 1600, some confusion arose in regards to the succession to the throne. Historian Jai Prakash Singh suggests that the inauspicious horoscope of the old king's heir, Yashodhar, made the nobility hesitant in accepting him as monarch. It was through such a situation that Ishwar, as well as another individual, Virabhadra Manikya, made bids for the throne, though the former appears to have been more successful.

His original name (Note: Ishwar Manikya having been an adopted title.) and relationship with the previous king are unknown. Among the possibilities is that he had been a brother of Yashodhar. Alternatively, he may have been Amaradurlabha, the younger brother of Rajdhar, who had been a distinguished veteran of the Arakan wars under Amar Manikya. Otherwise, he may have belonged to a collateral branch of the ruling dynasty.

There were coins minted in his name, though there is practically nothing known about him, with his name being omitted from the Rajmala, the Tripura royal chronicle. He was eventually ousted after a few months of rule in favour of Yashodhar, who had finally found backing from the nobility and formerly ascended the throne.
