= Joy Manikya I =

Maharaja of Tripura from 1573 to 1577

Maharaja of Tripura
- Reign: 1573–1577
- Predecessor: Udai Manikya
- Successor: Amar Manikya
- Died: 1577
- Consort: Subhadra Mahadevi
- Father: Udai Manikya
- Religion: Hinduism

Kingdom of Tripura
- Part of History of Tripura
Kings of Tripura
Maha Manikya	c. 1400–1431
Dharma Manikya I	1431–1462
Ratna Manikya I	1462–1487
Pratap Manikya	1487
Vijaya Manikya I	1488
Mukut Manikya	1489
Dhanya Manikya	1490–1515
Dhwaja Manikya	1515–1520
Deva Manikya	1520–1530
Indra Manikya I	1530–1532
Vijaya Manikya II	1532–1563
Ananta Manikya	1563–1567
Udai Manikya I	1567–1573
Joy Manikya I	1573–1577
Amar Manikya	1577–1585
Rajdhar Manikya I	1586–1600
Ishwar Manikya	1600
Yashodhar Manikya	1600–1623
Interregnum	1623–1626
Kalyan Manikya	1626–1660
Govinda Manikya	1660–1661
Chhatra Manikya	1661–1667
Govinda Manikya	1661–1673
Rama Manikya	1673–1685
Ratna Manikya II	1685–1693
Narendra Manikya	1693–1695
Ratna Manikya II	1695–1712
Mahendra Manikya	1712–1714
Dharma Manikya II	1714–1725
Jagat Manikya	1725–1729
Dharma Manikya II	1729
Mukunda Manikya	1729–1739
Joy Manikya II	1739–1744
Indra Manikya II	1744–1746
Udai Manikya II	1744
Joy Manikya II	1746
Vijaya Manikya III	1746–1748
Lakshman Manikya	1740s/1750s
Interregnum	1750s–1760
Krishna Manikya	1760–1783
Rajdhar Manikya II	1785–1806
Rama Ganga Manikya	1806–1809
Durga Manikya	1809–1813
Rama Ganga Manikya	1813–1826
Kashi Chandra Manikya	1826–1829
Krishna Kishore Manikya	1829–1849
Ishan Chandra Manikya	1849–1862
Bir Chandra Manikya	1862–1896
Radha Kishore Manikya	1896–1909
Birendra Kishore Manikya	1909–1923
Bir Bikram Kishore Manikya	1923–1947
Kirit Bikram Kishore Manikya	1947–1949; 1949–1978 (titular)
Kirit Pradyot Manikya	1978–present (titular)

Tripura monarchy data
- Manikya dynasty (Royal family)
- Agartala (Capital of the kingdom)
- Ujjayanta Palace (Royal residence)
- Pushbanta Palace (Royal residence)
- Neermahal (Royal residence)
- Rajmala (Royal chronicle)
- Tripura Buranji (Chronicle)
- Chaturdasa Devata (Family deities)

Joy Manikya I (died 1577) was the Maharaja of Tripura from 1573 to 1577.

== Life ==
He was the son of Udai Manikya, who had supplanted Tripura's previous ruling dynasty and adopted its cognomen in 1567. Following his father's death, Joy succeeded him on the throne in 1573. However, his rule was only nominal as the powerful general Ranagan Narayan, who was the husband of his paternal aunt, held actual control of the kingdom, using Joy as a puppet-monarch.

Narayan eventually grew jealous of the popularity enjoyed by Amaradeva, a prince of the former royal family. The latter was invited to a dinner where Narayan planned to have him killed. However, he escaped and, rallying his supporters, captured the regent and had his head cut off. When Joy demanded an explanation for Narayan's death, Amaradeva dispatched his troops against the king, who attempted to flee before being overtaken and also beheaded. Joy's death is believed to have occurred in 1577, having reigned about 4 years. Amaradeva subsequently took power under the name Amar Manikya, thus restoring the throne to the original ruling dynasty.
