= Barwani State =

Princely state of India

Coordinates: 22.03°N 74.9°E

Barwani State बड़वानी रियासत
- Princely State of British India
- 836–1948
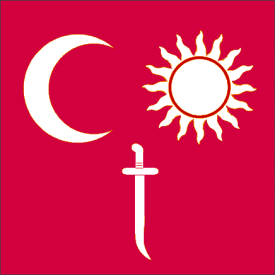
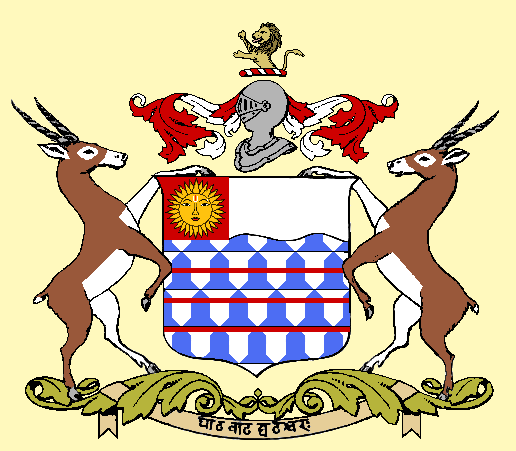
- Flag Coat of arms

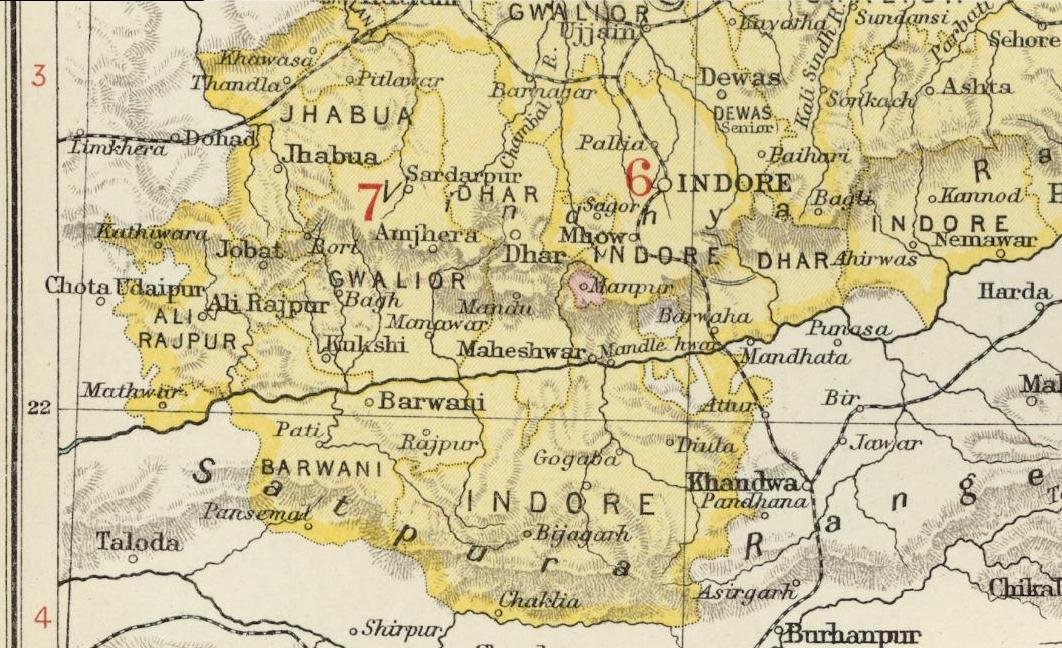
- Barwani State in the Imperial Gazetteer of India
- Capital: Barwani
- Area
  - 1941: 3,051.02 km^{2} (1,178.01 sq mi)
- Population
  - 1941: 176,666
- History
  - Established: 836
  - Accession to the Union of India: 1948
Succeeded by
India
- Today part of: Madhya Pradesh, India
- Barwani Princely State

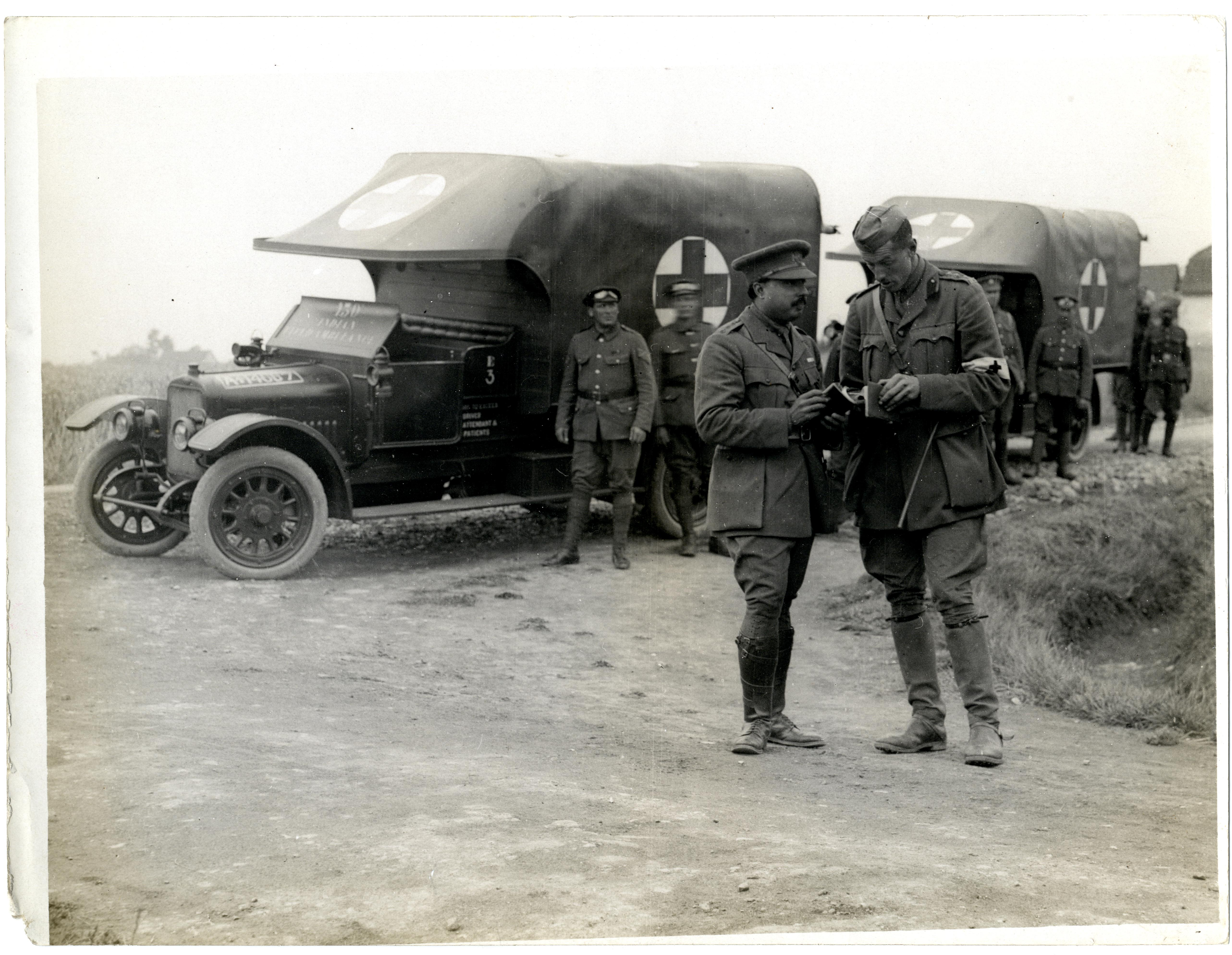
Maharaja Ranjit Singh of Barwani (1888 - 1930) with ambulance cars in Merville, France, during World War I

Barwani State was a princely state in India. The seat was at Barwani.

== History ==
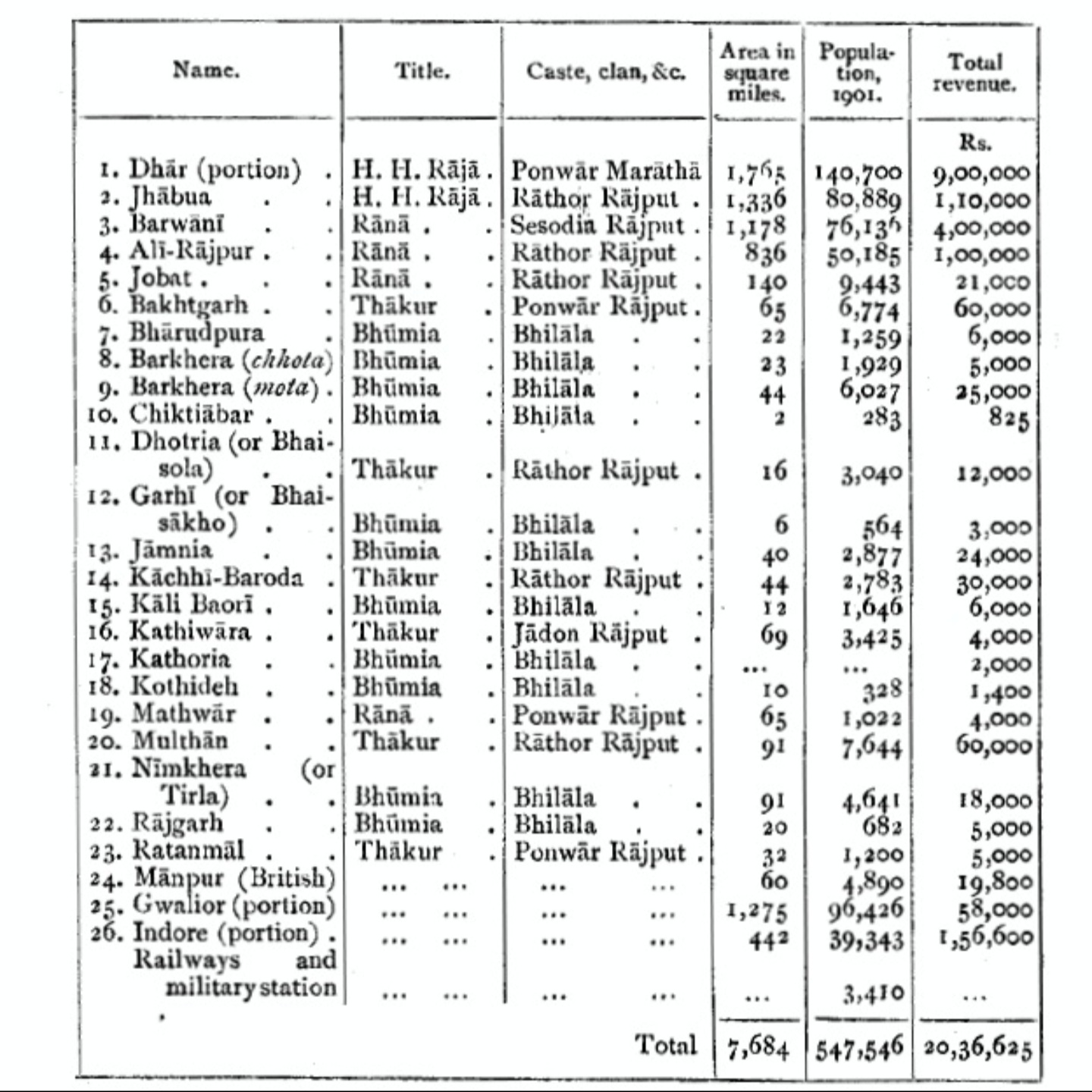
Bhopawar Agency Information

The state was founded in the 11th or 14th century, at which time it was known as Avasgarh. the Rana's of Avasgarh were Sisodia's who claimed to be the descendants of Bappa Rawal. The records of the state claim that Awasgarh had 51 Rana's however there is little information about their names or the dates they reigned in. Parsan Singh, the 35th Rana was defeated by the Sultan of Delhi and taken as prisoner, the rana agreed to convert to Islam on the condition that he gets his ancestral lands back. 3 of Parsans descendants were Muslims although they followed their Hindu customs, the Rana's eventually converted back to Hinduism. The 41st Rana Chandra Singh moved his capital to the safer position of Barwani. The state lost most of its territory during the Maratha domination in the 17th century, however it never became tributary to any Major power.

Under the British Raj, Barwani was a state of the Bhopawar Agency, a division of the Central India Agency. The state lay in the Satpura Range south of the Narmada River. It had an area of 3,051 km^{2} (1,178 sq mi) and a population, in 1901, of 76,136. The average revenue of the state was Rs.4,00,000. The inhabitants were predominantly Bhil tribals. The forests were under a British official.

After India's independence in 1947, the Rana of Barwani acceded to India, and Barwani became part of the Nimar District of Madhya Bharat state. Madhya Bharat was merged into Madhya Pradesh on 1 November 1956.

=== Rulers ===
Barwani State was an 9 gun salute state. The rulers of the State, whose title was Rana, were rulers of the Sisodia clan, descended from the ruling dynasty of Udaipur.

==== Ranas ====
- 1675 - 1700 Jodh Singh (d. 1700)
- 1700 - 1708 Parbat Singh (d. 1708)
- 1708 - 1730 Mohan Singh I (d. 1731)
- 1730 - 1760 Anup Singh (d. 1760)
- 1760 - 1794 Umed Singh (d. 1794)
- 1794 - 1839 Mohan Singh II (d. 1839)
- 1839 - 1861 Jashwant Singh (1st time) (d. 1880)
- 1861 - 1873 vacant
- 1873 - 1880 Jashwant Singh (2nd time)
- 15 Aug 1880 - 1894 Indrajit Singh (d. 1894)
- 14 Dec 1894 – 21 Apr 1930 Ranjit Singh (b. 1888 – d. 1930)
- 21 Apr 1930 – 15 Aug 1947 Devi Singh (b. 1922 – d. 2007)

== See also ==
- Bhopawar Agency
- Political integration of India
