= Nirpat Singh =

Maharaja of Panna from 1849 to 1870

- Maharaja Mahendra

Maharaja of Panna
- Reign: c. 1849 – 8 June1870
- Predecessor: Harbans Rai
- Successor: Rudra Pratap Singh
- Died: 9 June 1870
Names
- Nirpat Singh Ju Deo
- House: Panna
- Dynasty: Bundela
- Father: Kishor Singh

Nirpat Singh was the Maharaja of Panna from 1849 until his death in 1870.

== Biography ==
He was born to Kishor Singh and, after the death of his elder brother, Harbans Rai, in 1849, succeeded him on the throne of Panna. Although he was the rightful successor to his brother, the British government refused to recognize him until he abolished the practice of sati across his territories. Accordingly, he banned sati in Panna. When he was granted ruling powers, he proved to be an excellent administrator. During the revolt of 1857, he remained loyal to the British and assisted them in securing the Kalinjar fort and clearing Damoh of rebels. For his services, the British government awarded him a khilat worth Rs. 20,000, an eleven-gun salute, and the Simariya. In 1862, the British government granted him the right of adoption, and in 1869, he was given the personal title of Mahendra.

On 9 June 1870, while out shooting, he was killed by a tiger. His son, Rudra Pratap Singh, succeeded him on the throne of Panna.
