= Indore Christian College =

Educational institution in Indore

Coordinates: 22.713027°N 75.869927°E

- Motto: Justitia et Veritas, sed in omnibus Caritas (Latin)
- Motto in English: Justice and Truth, but in all things Charity
- Affiliations: DAVV; BCI; NAAC
- Principal: Dr. Amit David
- Location: Indore, Madhya Pradesh, India
- Campus: 5.42 acres (21,900 m^{2})
- Website: indorechristiancollege.co.in

Indore Christian College is a co-educational institute in Indore, Madhya Pradesh that offers certificate courses, as well as undergraduate, postgraduate and doctoral programmes.

== History ==
In 1884, Rev. Dr. John Wilkie opened a high school at Indore in connection with the Central India Mission of the Presbyterian Church in Canada. This school was named Canadian Mission School and was the first Christian high school in Central India Agency. Wilkie was from Guelph. It was affiliated with the University of Calcutta to F.A. in 1868, and to B.A. in 1893. During his visit to Indore in 1891, Henry Petty-Fitzmaurice, the then Viceroy and Governor-General of India, paid a visit to the school on 25 November and on the occasion said:

I rejoice to find your little Canadian colony carrying on its good work successfully in India. I do not believe that the cause of education could be entrusted to better hands. There is no country in which popular education and the best means of providing it are better understood than in Canada. I often admired the completeness of the educational system which prevailed there. It is a system which provides what should be the great object of all systems of education: a graduated series of institutions, carrying the student, without a break of continuity, from the elementary courses of the public school to the higher education of the College and the University. I have no doubt that the education which you are engaged in giving here is of the right sort, and well suited to the requirements of this part of India. I observe with pleasure that you lay stress upon the fact that it is not entirely bookish, but that, to use your own words, it takes notice of the physical and moral sides of our nature, as well as of the mental. The love of manly sports, and the acquisition of a healthy habit of body, form some of the most valuable ingredients of education. There is probably no country in which this kind of education is more needed than in India.

It was affiliated with the University of Allahabad for B.A. in arts in 1905 and for M.A. in philosophy in 1910. Between 22 and 28 February 1910, the college, at the initiative of Prof. Lyons, organised an economic exhibition under the leadership of its Economics Club. The exhibition was opened on 25 February by Mr. Beville, then agent to the governor-general in Central India, and highlighted Indore's educational, industrial and commercial progress through a display of charts, maps, photographs and industrial exhibits. As an isolated missionary institution, it served no substantial Christian community and instead catered primarily to Hindu students. It was renamed Indore Christian College in 1915. In 1927, upon the establishment of Agra University, it was affiliated to it. The college started teaching law in 1956. When in 1964 the University of Indore, now Devi Ahilya Vishwavidyalaya, came into being, the college became affiliated with it.

Alexander A. Scott and his wife came to work at the college in 1912. Over the course of time, Alexander served as principal of the college, and in 1952 he retired to Canada, where he became moderator of the United Church of Canada. Since his departure, the college has had only Indian principals.

== Aim ==
The aim of Indore Christian College is:

To make a contribution to the country by developing good citizenship, able leadership and Christ-like character through sound higher education based on Christian principles and pervaded by Christian spirit. To build up the Church by providing like education for young men and women of the Christian community.

== Motto ==
College motto is Justitia et Veritas, sed in omnibus Caritas (lit. 'Justice and Truth, but in all things Charity').

== Administration ==
For administrative purposes, the Mission Council, which serves as the college's governing body, delegates its authority to a Local Board. The board consists of the Principal, the Vice-Principal, three representatives of the Mission Council, three members of the college faculty, and one representative of the Indian Church. It may also co-opt up to two additional members. The Local Board is responsible for determining institutional policy, maintaining the college buildings and grounds, making faculty appointments, and overseeing the institution's finances.

== Subjects ==
It provides education in the following subjects: philosophy, political science, economics, law, Hindi, history, English, sociology, Sanskrit and social work.

== Alumni ==
- Devi Singh
- Vikram Verma
- Ramesh Surajmal Garg
- Lokendra Singh Judeo
- Dada Dharmadhikari
- Shahu II
