= Ranjit Singh (ruler) =

Rana of Barwani (1888 – 1930)

- Singh in Merville

Rana of Barwani
- Reign: 3 November 1894 – 21 April 1930
- Predecessor: Indrajit Singh
- Successor: Devi Singh
- Born: 26 December 1888
- Died: 21 April 1930 (aged 41)
- Spouse: Hari Kunwarba (m. 1907); Tej Kunwarba (m. 1920)
- Issue: Mukund Kanwar; Devi Singh; Udai Singh
- Father: Indrajit Singh

Ranjit Singh (26 December 1888 – 21 April 1930) was Rana of Barwani from 3 November 1894 until his death in 1947.

== Early life, family, and education ==
He was born on 26 December 1888 to Indrajit Singh, the Rana of Barwani. He commenced his educational career at Daly College in Indore but left it in August 1903 and subsequently joined Mayo College in Ajmer in October 1903. He completed his Diploma and Post-Diploma courses at Mayo College. Following completion of his studies in Ajmer, he returned to his state in 1907. He received practical training in administration under the supervision of H. K. Barr. He married twice: firstly, in June 1907, to Hari Kunwarba, the daughter of Mansinhji Sursinhji, the Thakore of Palitana; secondly, on 14 May 1920, to Tej Kunwarba, the daughter of Daulat Singh, the Maharaja of Idar. He had issue: a daughter, Mukund Kanwar, and two sons, Devi Singh and Udai Singh.

== Reign ==
Upon the death of his father on 3 November 1894, he acceded to the throne of Barwani. As he was a minor at the time of his accession, the state was placed in charge of a superintendent, who administered the affairs of the state in his stead but under the direction of the political agent. He was invested with full ruling powers on 12 January 1910 by Hugh Daly, the then Agent to the Governor-General for the Central India Agency, at a durbar. On the occasion, he had declared that, in his state, there would be no tolerance for any political speeches, actions or views that did not align with a posture of complete loyalty and devotion to the Crown and Government of India. During his reign, he introduced several administrative reforms and improvements across his state, which included completing the survey and assessment of most state-controlled land, improving police discipline and the construction of tanks, wells, roads and bridges, and the erection of buildings for state officials, such as Ranjit Club. He attended the Delhi Durbar of 1911. He participated in the state entry into Delhi with the abdagiri, chatr, chanwars, morchals and chhadi, two carriages, and a detachment of his bodyguard with sardars on horseback, and on the day of the durbar, paid homage to the George V. On the occasion, his gun salute was raised from nine to eleven as a personal distinction.

Upon the outbreak of World War I, he placed all the resources of his state at the disposal of the Government and offered his personal services for active service at the front. His offer was accepted, and on 18 February 1915, George V approved the Government of India's appointment of him as an honorary Captain in the army. He subsequently proceeded to France where he served with the Indian Expeditionary Force. At the front, he served under the command of John French and was in charge of the six motor ambulances that were contributed by him and the rulers of Dhar, Ali Rajpur and Jhabua. He also saw action in Flanders. He remained on active service from April 1915 to 8 September 1915. Besides that, he maintained 50 beds for sick and wounded soldiers at the King Edward Hospital in Indore and made regular monthly contributions to the Chief Guest House Hospital in Indore. On 1 January 1918, George V appointed him a Knight Commander of the Most Eminent Order of the Indian Empire for services in connection with the World War I. On 1 January 1918, he was granted the permanent rank of honorary Captain in the army. He was awarded the Legion of Honour by the Government of France after the war. In 1921, he was granted a permanent salute of eleven guns.

== Interests ==
He was an accomplished sportsman and was particularly skilled in shooting and tennis. He was fond of motorcars and had purchased his first automobile, a De Dion, in 1902; in 1903, he purchased a steam car by Turner-Miesse. His collection subsequently grew to include several Daimlers and Napiers, an Itala, a Citroën and a Swallow. In 1927, he purchased a LaSalle Sports Phaeton for his children. In 1929 he ordered a Rolls-Royce with torpedo coachwork. His final automobile order was for a Bentley 4½ Litre. He employed European chauffeurs and mechanics to maintain and operate his collection.

== Death ==
He died on 21 April 1930 and was succeeded by his son Devi Singh.

== Gallery ==
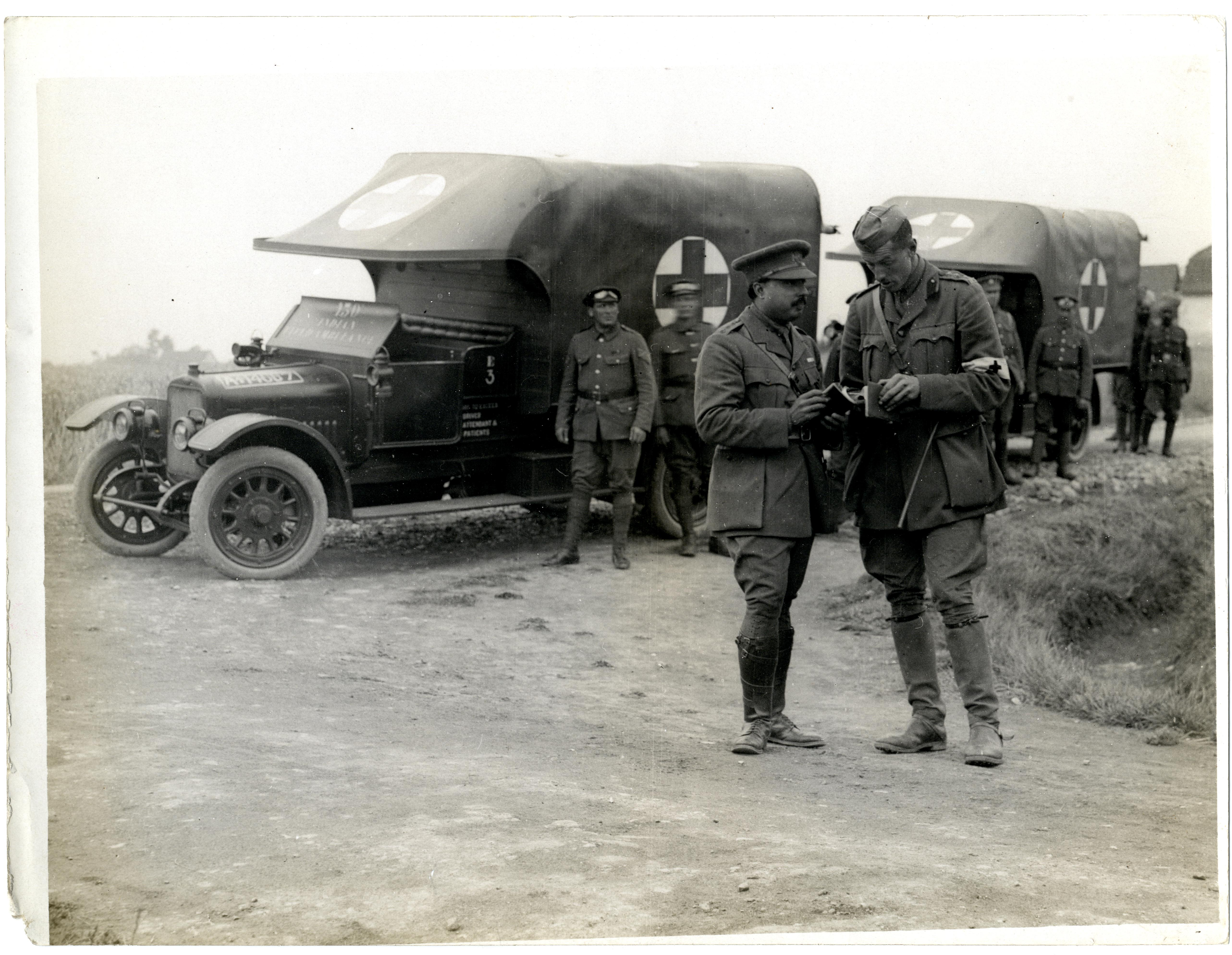
Singh with ambulance cars in Merville

Singh in Merville
