= Devi Singh (ruler) =

Rana of Barwani (1930 – 2007)

Rana of Barwani
- Reign: 21 April 1930 – 15 September 2007
- Predecessor: Ranjit Singh
- Successor: Manvendra Singh
- Born: 21 August 1922
- Died: 15 September 2007 (aged 85)
- Spouse: Dilhar Kunwarba (m. 1943; died 2007)
- Issue: Anirudh Singh; Manvendra Singh; Divyaraj Singh; Nirmala Kumari
- Dynasty: Sisodia
- Father: Ranjit Singh
- Education: Indore Christian College; Daly College

Devi Singh (19 August 1922 – 15 September 2007) was Rana of Barwani from 21 April 1930 until his death in 2007.

== Early life, family, and education ==
Singh was born on 19 August 1922 to Ranjit Singh, the Rana of Barwani, and his wife, Tej Kunwarba. He belonged to the Sisodia clan of Rajputs and traced his descent from Rama. He received his education in Indore. He first attended Daly College, where he passed his diploma examination in 1939, after which he enrolled at Indore Christian College and from there completed his intermediate examination. While studying at Christian College, he joined the Officers' Training Corps in Indore, where he underwent a course in military training for six months. He subsequently received four months of training in judicial and administrative work, as well as training in agriculture at the Institute of Plant Industry in Indore. He also visited several states in Rajputana and Central India to study their administrations. On 19 May 1943, he married Dilhar Kunwarba, a granddaughter of Khengarji III, the Maharao of Kutch. The two together had issue: three sons, Anirudh Singh, Manvendra Singh and Divyaraj Singh, and a daughter, Nirmala Kumari. Dilhar died on 18 August 2007.

== Reign ==
Upon the death of his father on 21 April 1930, he acceded to the throne of Barwani. As he was a minor at the time, the administration of the state was carried on in his stead by the minority administration council. This council was headed by Harilal N. Gosalia, the dewan and president of the state council. During this time, Harilal caused many beautiful buildings to be erected in Barwani. Upon coming of age, he was invested with full ruling powers on 18 October 1942 by the Resident for Central India States. On the occasion, he reaffirmed his loyalty to the Crown and, as World War II was going on, placed all the resources of his state at its disposal and offered his personal services for active service at the front. During the course of the war, he made several contributions to War Loans and Funds, and had the garments, which were knitted by the Ladies War-Work Party of the state under the guidance of his wife, sent regularly to the front. He signed the instrument of accession by which his state acceded to the Dominion of India on 11 August 1947 and this was accepted by the Government of India on 16 August 1947. He used to receive a privy purse of Rs. 1,45,000 from the Government. In 1948, he signed the covenant by which his state was merged with the territories of other rulers, who too had signed it, to create Madhya Bharat. On 6 September 1970, the president of India, by the powers vested in him under article 366(22) of the Constitution of India, issued an order withdrawing Singh's recognition as the ruler of Barwani. Consequently, he ceased to be officially recognised by the Government of India as the state's ruler.

== Death ==
He died on 15 September 2007. As his elder son had predeceased him, his second son, Manvendra Singh, succeeded him as the claimant to his titles.
