= Tripura Merger Agreement =

The Tripura Merger Agreement was the official agreement under which the erstwhile Kingdom of Tripuri joined the state of India.

== Background ==
The State of Tripura was one of the princely states of India. According to the Rajmala ("Chronicles of Kings"), Tripura was ruled continuously by as many as 184 Tripuri kings with sovereign and independent status prior to its merger with the Indian Union in 1949, after the death of the last ruling King, Bir Bikram Kishore Debbarman. His successor, Kirit Bikram Kishore Deb Barman, was thirteen years old at the time of the merger. King Bir Bikram Kishore Debbarman had died in 1947, after which a Council of Regency government formed under the presidency of Queen Kanchan Prava Devi, mother of Kirit Bikram Kishore Deb Barman.

Within a few months after the unnatural demise of the King, Tripura faced a crisis, with internal threats and threats from external forces such as East Pakistan. The Queen came under severe pressure to join the Indian Union. On the advice of the Government of India, she dissolved the Council of Regency and became the Regent on 12 January 1948. More than a year later, on 9 September 1949, she signed the Tripura Merger Agreement with effect from 15 October 1949. Under the agreement Tripura became part of the Indian Union. It was thereafter administered by a Chief Commissioner as a 'C' category state.

== Message by the then Minister of Home Affairs ==
Sardar Vallabhbhai Patel, the then Minister of Home Affairs, offered the following message on the occasion of the Merger of Tripura on 15 October 1949.

The State of Tripura, with its isolated situation, yet occupying a position of strategic importance of the Eastern Border of India, has an ancient history and rich culture. The partition of the country has, however, brought in its train for this small State a host of problems, which, in the present State of its development, it was impossible for it to solve unaided. The Government of India and Her Highness the Maharani Regent, acting on behalf of the minor Ruler, have come to the conclusion that in the interests of the State and its people, and of the country as a whole, it was essential that the Centre should make itself responsible for its administration of the State and the well being of its people. Tripura thus becomes from today a centrally administered area. I am most grateful to Her Highness for having come to this agreement. Hers was not any easy task in the peculiar circumstance in which she found herself. I am sure that providence will reward her for the courage and boldness with which she has taken this decision. To the people of Tripura, I can only say this: though far (and remote) from the capital city of the country, it will always claim our attention and we shall do our best to ensure that its link and connection with the main land are strengthened and it comes nearer to us. They will not stand alone to battle with the manifold problems that confront them. They will have the resources and the assistance of the Centre on which they can count. With their cooperation and help we hope that we shall deal with their problems efficiently and effectively. May God bless our joint effort with success.
