= Kanchan Prava Devi =

Queen of Tripura state and politician

Kanchan Prabha Devi
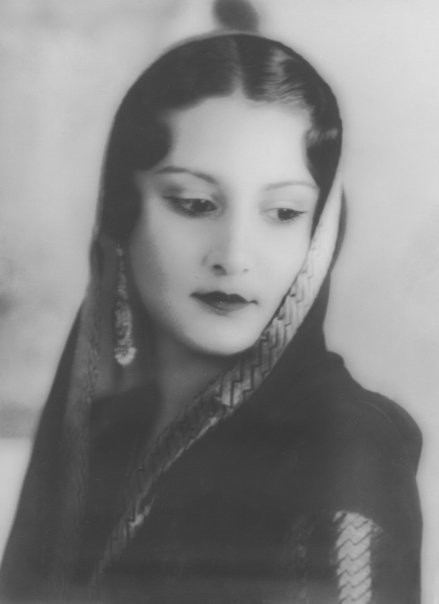
- Spouse: Bir Bikram Kishore Manikya Bahadur
- Issue: Kirit Bikram Kishore Debbarma
- House: Panna State (by birth); Manikya dynasty (by marriage)
- Father: Maharaja Yadvendra Singh
- Religion: Hindu

Maharani Kanchan Prava Devi was a queen of Tripura as the wife of Bir Bikram Kishore Manikya Bahadur, king of Tripura State. After her husband's death in 1947, she was regent of Tripura until it was merged with India in 1949.

== Life ==
She was the daughter of Yadvendra Singh, then Maharaja of Panna. She married Bir Bikram Kishore Debbarma, king of Tripura State, who became king in 1923.

Her husband passed away in 1947. Since her son Kirit Bikram Manikya Bahadur Debbarma was still a minor, she governed the princely state as head of her son's Council of Regency.

Her Dewan was A.B. Chatterjee. She played a pivotal role in rehabilitating refugees and victims of the violence associated with the partition of India in the state of Tripura.

In 1948, she abolished the Council of Regency and took sole control as regent.

She ruled Tripura, overseeing its merger and incorporation into independent India. She signed the Tripura Merger Agreement on 9 September 1949. She stepped down as regent when the state was merged with India in 1949.

She founded the MBB College in Agartala.
