= Dada Dharmadhikari =

Indian activist (1899–1985)

Shankar Trimbak Dharmadhikari
- Born: 18 June 1899; Betul
- Died: 1 December 1985 (aged 86); Sevagram, Wardha, Maharashtra
- Other name: Dada Dharmadhikari
- Children: 4 (including Chandrashekhar Dharmadhikari)

Shankar Trimbak Dharmadhikari (18 June 1899 – 1 December 1985; Hindi pronunciation: [ʃə̃kəɾ t̪ɾɪmbək d̪ʱəɾmaːd̪ɪkaːɾiː]), better known as Dada Dharmadhikari, was an Indian freedom fighter, and a leader of social reform movements in India. He was a strong adherent of Mahatma Gandhi's principles. His eldest daughter (Usha) was married to Adv. G Y Tamaskar of Bemetara, Chhattisgarh. His second child, son by name Pradyumna was also a freedom fighter and lived life as a common man. His third child, a son by name Yashwanth Shankar Dharmadhikari served as the Advocate-general of Madhya Pradesh and his youngest son Chandrashekhar Shankar Dharmadhikari served as judge of Bombay High Court. He died in Sevagram, Wardha on 1 December 1985.

== Early life and work ==
Shankar Trimbak Dharmadhikari was born on 18 June 1899 at Madhya Pradesh, in the Betul district. He studied at Indore Christian College and afterwards studied at Morris College in Nagpur. He also studied Adi Shankara's vedantic works for about a year. He left in the middle of his studies to join the independence movement.

== See also ==
- Gandhism
- Sarvodaya
