= Indrajit Singh =

Rana of Barwani from 1880 to 1894

Rana of Barwani
- Reign: 15 August 1880 – 14 December 1894
- Predecessor: Jaswant Singh
- Successor: Ranjit Singh
- Born: c. 1840
- Died: December 14, 1894 (aged 71–72)
- Issue: Ranjit Singh; Dashrath Singh; Chandra Kanwar
- Father: Mohan Singh

Indrajit Singh (1840 – 14 December 1894) was Rana of Barwani from 15 August 1880 until his death in 1894.

== Early life and family ==
Singh was born to Mohan Singh in 1840. He married and had issue: two sons, Ranjit Singh and Dashrath Singh, and a daughter, Chandra Kanwar.

== Reign ==
Upon the death of his older brother Jaswant Singh on 15 August 1880, he succeeded him as the Rana of Barwani. However, he was not invested with administrative powers, and the administration of the state was conducted in his stead by his diwan, Muhammad Najaf Khan. In 1883, the pargana of Anjad was placed under his administration by the Government of India to test if he was a capable administrator or not, and when he successfully carried out the administration, it was recommended to the Government by the officials to invest him with full administrative powers. Accordingly, in 1886, he was invested with full administrative powers, but on the condition that if he failed to conduct it appropriately, the former administrative state would be brought back.

== Death ==
He died on 14 December 1894, and was succeeded by Ranjit Singh to his title and rank.
