= Chandrashekhar Shankar Dharmadhikari =

Indian judge, independence activist, lawyer, and author (1927–2019)

Justice Chandrashekhar Shankar Dharmadhikari
- Born: 20 November 1927; Raipur, Madhya Pradesh, India.
- Died: 3 January 2019 (aged 91); Nagpur
- Education: M.A.L.L.B. of Nagpur University, Maharashtra.
- Occupations: An Indian independence movement activist, a lawyer, a judge and an author.
- Movement: Quit India Movement of 1942
- Spouse: Late Mrs. Tara Dharmadhikari
- Children: Aruna Patil is Doctor, Satyaranjan was judge of High Court of Bombay and Ashutosh is an Advocate.
- Parent(s): Late Smt. Damayanti Dharmadhikari and Acharya Dada Dharmadhikari
- Awards: Padma Bhushan

Chandrashekhar Shankar Dharmadhikari (Dr. C. S. Dharmadhikari) (20 November 1927 – 3 January 2019) was an Indian judge, independence activist, lawyer, author. He was acting chief justice of Bombay High Court. He was awarded Padma Bhushan in 2003. He authored many books in the Hindi, Marathi and Gujarati languages. He died on 3 January 2019 in Nagpur at the age of 91 years.

== Early life ==
Dharmadhikari was born to Damayanti Dharmadhikari and Acharya Dada Dharmadhikari. In his childhood biography Shashvat Shikshan Sampatti taken from "Aathvanitil Shala Ani Shikshak" from Jivan Shikshan, he mentions how he and other freedom fighters' children grew up like a "Cactus" meaning that they grew up and learned independently as their parents would be away in freedom campaigns most of their time. His father was imprisoned in 1930, 1932 and 1942 and his mother took part in individual Satyagraha in 1941 and Quit India Movement of 1942 and was imprisoned for about three years due to which the upper class would say to him (also to other children like him) that "Neither the fear for father nor mother; the son turned into a volunteer." (Na Baap ka Dar, Na Maa ka Dar, Beta bana Voluntar")

As a child he went to primary municipal school near Chitnis Park in Nagpur for one year. In 1935 he moved to Wardha and used to stay at Bajajwadi which was a center for many freedom fighters. There he took entry in second standard at Tilak Municipal Primary School. At that time he with his friend found a club which was named Ghanchakkar Samaj by his father Dada Dharmdhikari. After completing his primary education he took admission at Nav Bharat Vidyalaya, Wardha which was set up under the influence of Mahatma Gandhi. C.S. Dharmadhikari was also educated from S.B. City College, Noshar Mahavidyala and University College of Law Nagpur.

== Indian independence movement activist ==
He was named in a list of freedom fighters by the Government of Maharashtra.

== Judge ==
He graduated as M.A.L.L.B. from Nagpur University College of Law. He enrolled as an Advocate of the Nagpur High Court on 25 October 1956, of the Bombay High Court on 21 July 1958 and of the Supreme Court on 20 July 1959. He was appointed Assistant Government Pleader at Nagpur in August 1965 and Additional Government Pleader High Court at Bombay, Nagpur Bench, in October 1970. He served as Government Pleader of High Court of Bombay, Nagpur Bench from 1965 to 1972. C. S. Dharmadhikari was appointed Additional Judge of the Bombay High Court on 13 July 1972 and Permanent Judge from 24 November 1972. He retired on 20 November 1989.

He was also the chairman of Maharashtra Administrative Tribunal from 7 July 1991 to 20 November 1992.

Judgments delivered by him, relating to Rights of Women, tribal people, children, insane people, prisoners are landmarks. In his Judgment during the Emergency, he held that apart from the Constitutional Right, Right to Life is natural and human right and therefore, even during the Emergency, a citizen has a right to approach the High Court, as natural and human right to life cannot be taken away which was a unique judgment. As per this Judgment he entertained the petitions and released the detained people, against whom there was no material.

In 2014, his committee recommended to Maharashtra government a "complete ban on bar girls in hotels and restaurants" as well as "curbs on social media" as these have a "corrupting influence", in order to reduce crimes against women.

== Other positions held ==
He was the chairman of Maharashtra Administrative Tribunal from 1991 to 1992 and was also chairman, Educational Regulatory Authority. He is associated with Maharashtra State as well as the National Women's Commission, Jamnalal Bajaj Foundation and Global Schools Foundation. Chandrashekhar Dharmadhikari believed in Gandhian values and held the trusteeship of Gandhi Research Foundation and several other Mahatma Gandhi foundations. He was also head of Dahanu Taluka Environment Protection Authority (DTEPA).

=== Corporate life ===
Having retired as judge, Dharmadhikari served as director with cricketer Chandu Borde in a consulting company.
