= Tripura (princely state) =

State of British India

Coordinates: 23°50′N 91°17′E

Tripura State (Hill Tipperah)
- 1809–1949
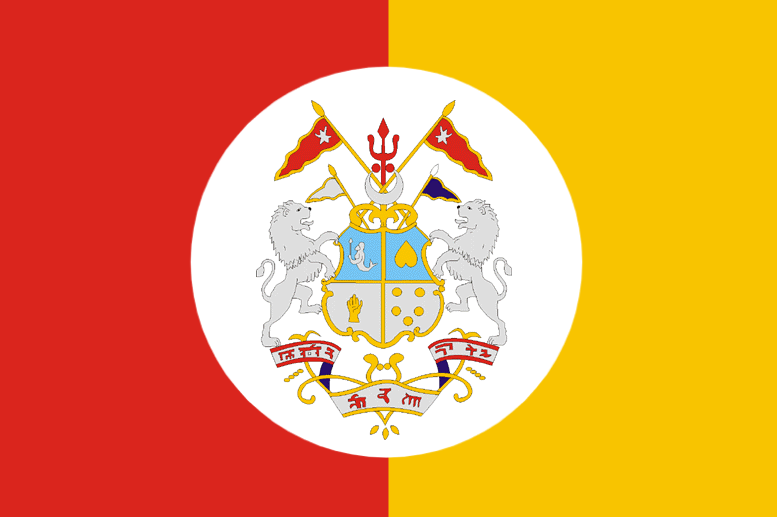
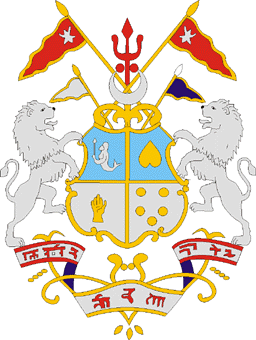
- Flag Coat of arms

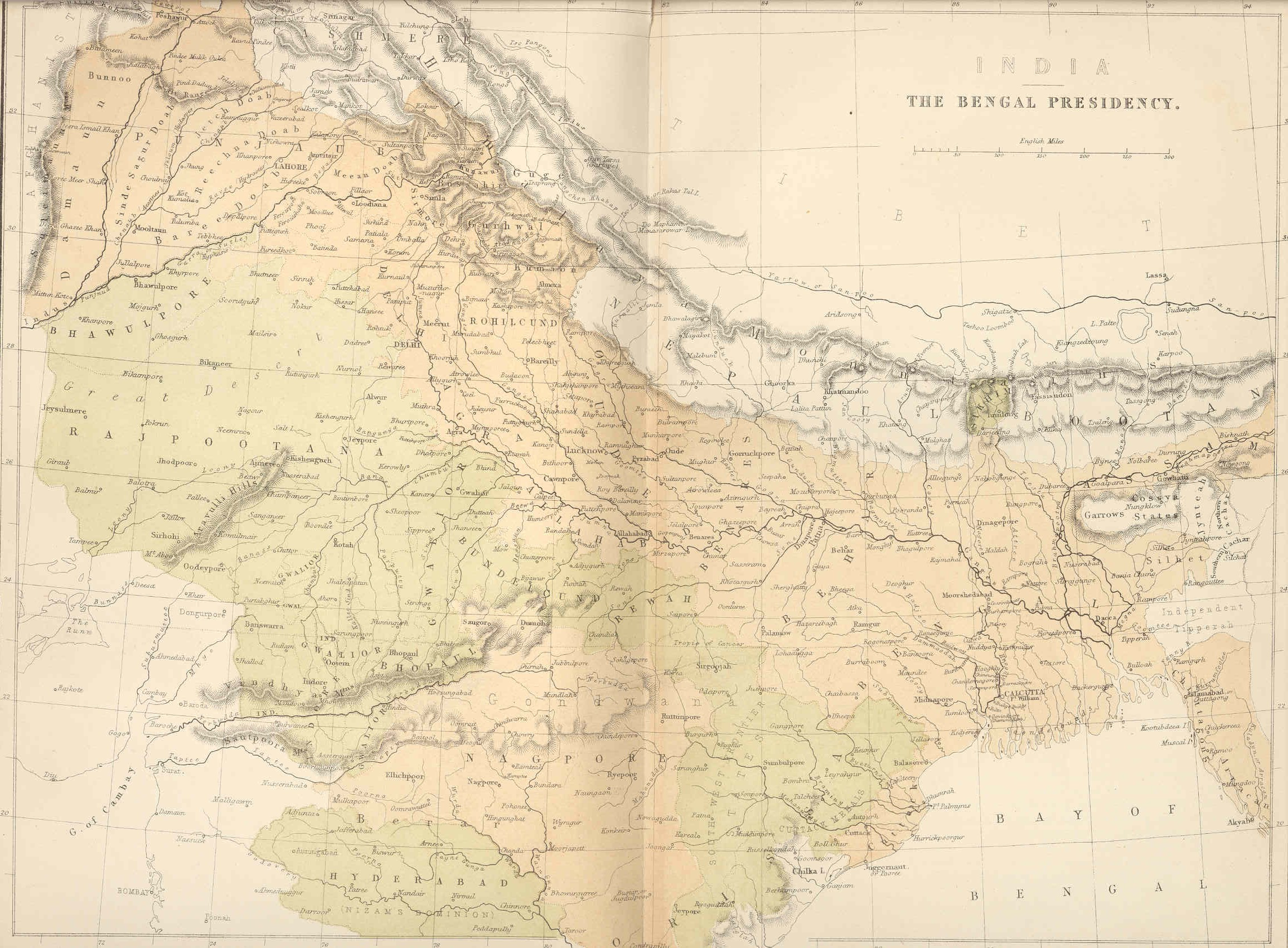
- 1858 map of the Bengal Presidency and 'Independent Tipperah' in the far right
- Capital: Agartala
- History
  - British protectorate: 1809
  - Accession to India: 13 August 1947
  - Merger Agreement signed: 9 September 1949
  - Merged into the Dominion of India: 15 October 1949

Area
- 1941: 10,660 km^{2} (4,120 sq mi)

Population
  - 1941: 513,000
Preceded by	Succeeded by
Twipra Kingdom	Tripura

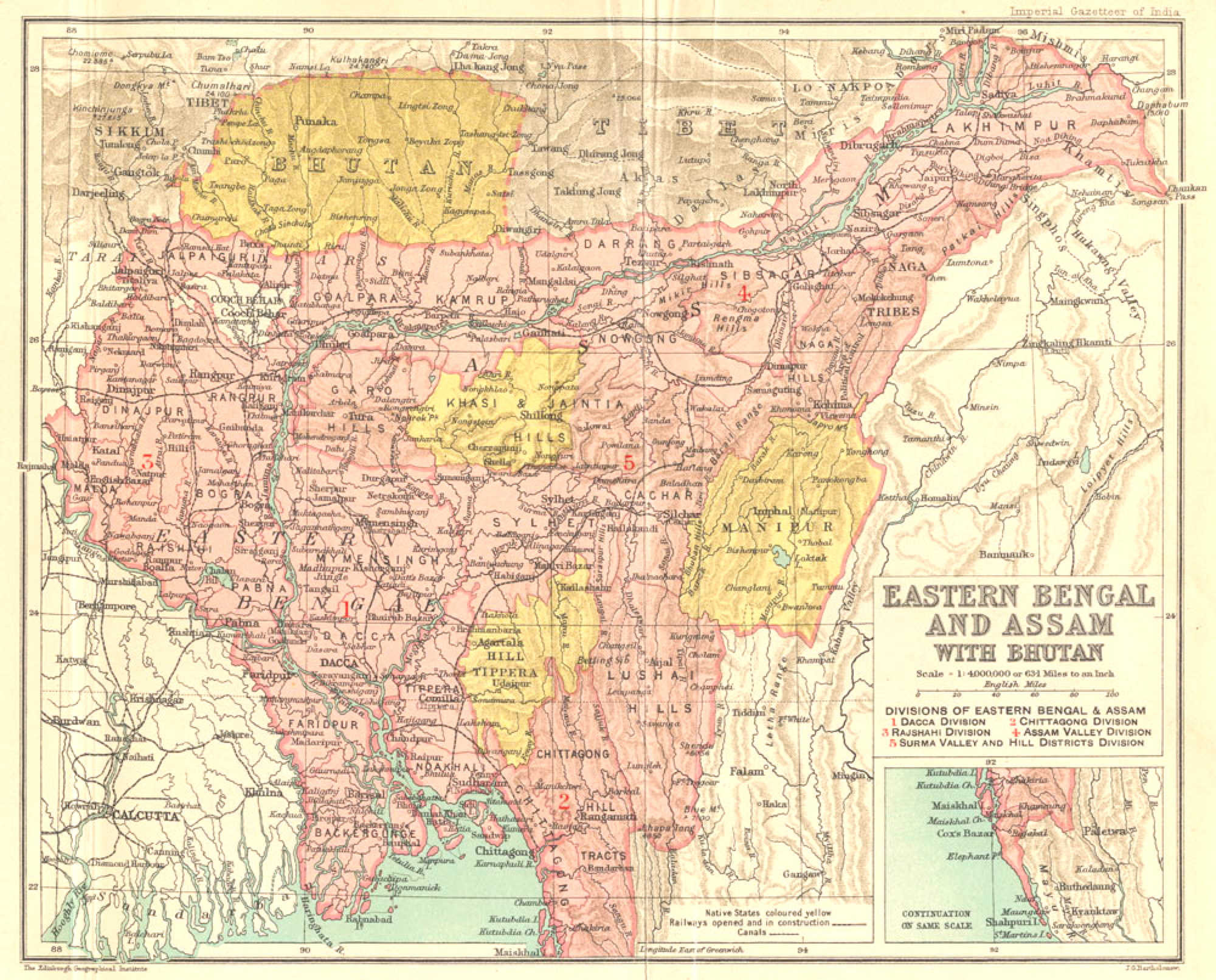
'Hill Tipperah' in the Bengal Gazetteer, 1907

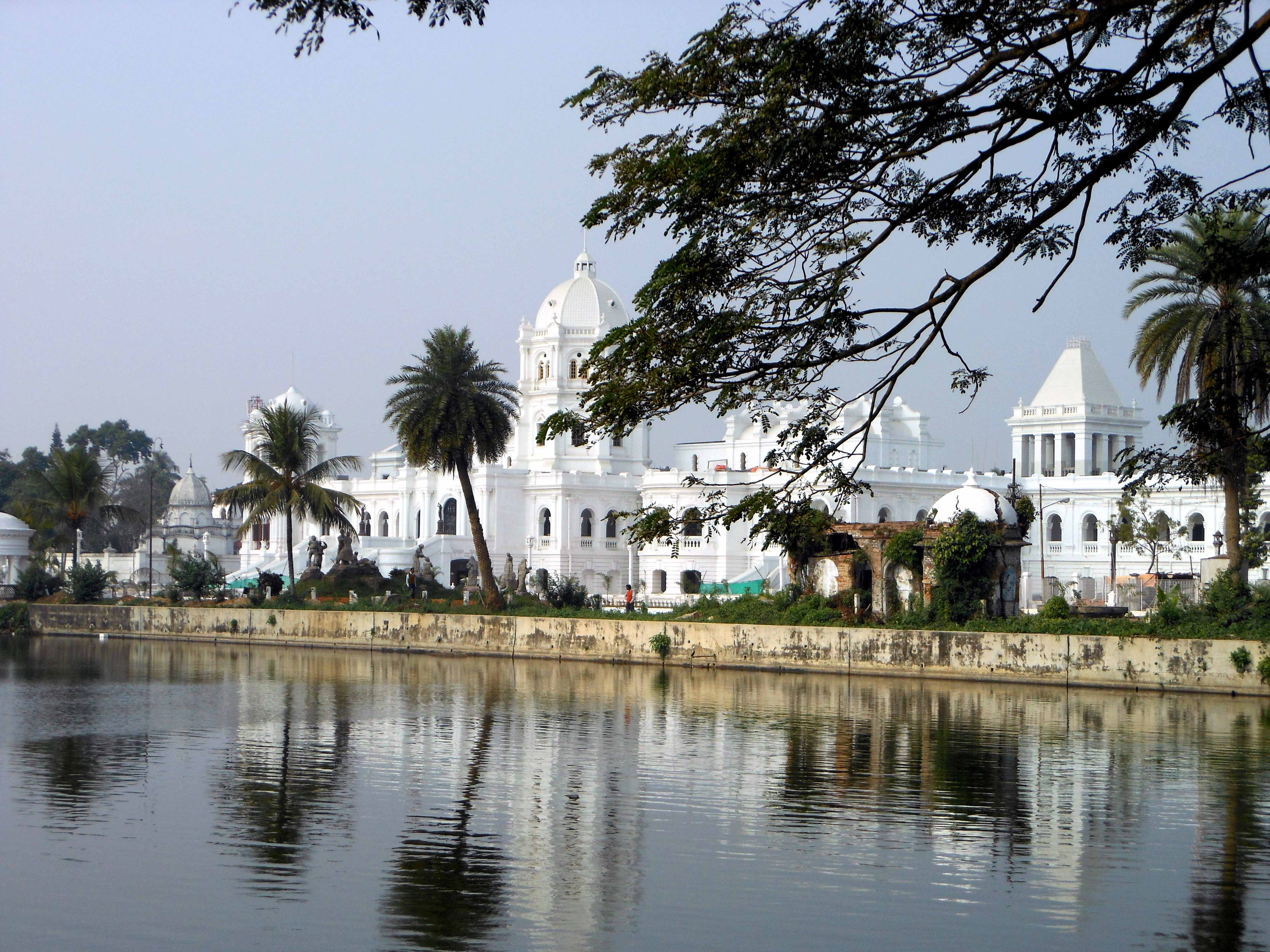
Ujjayanta Palace.

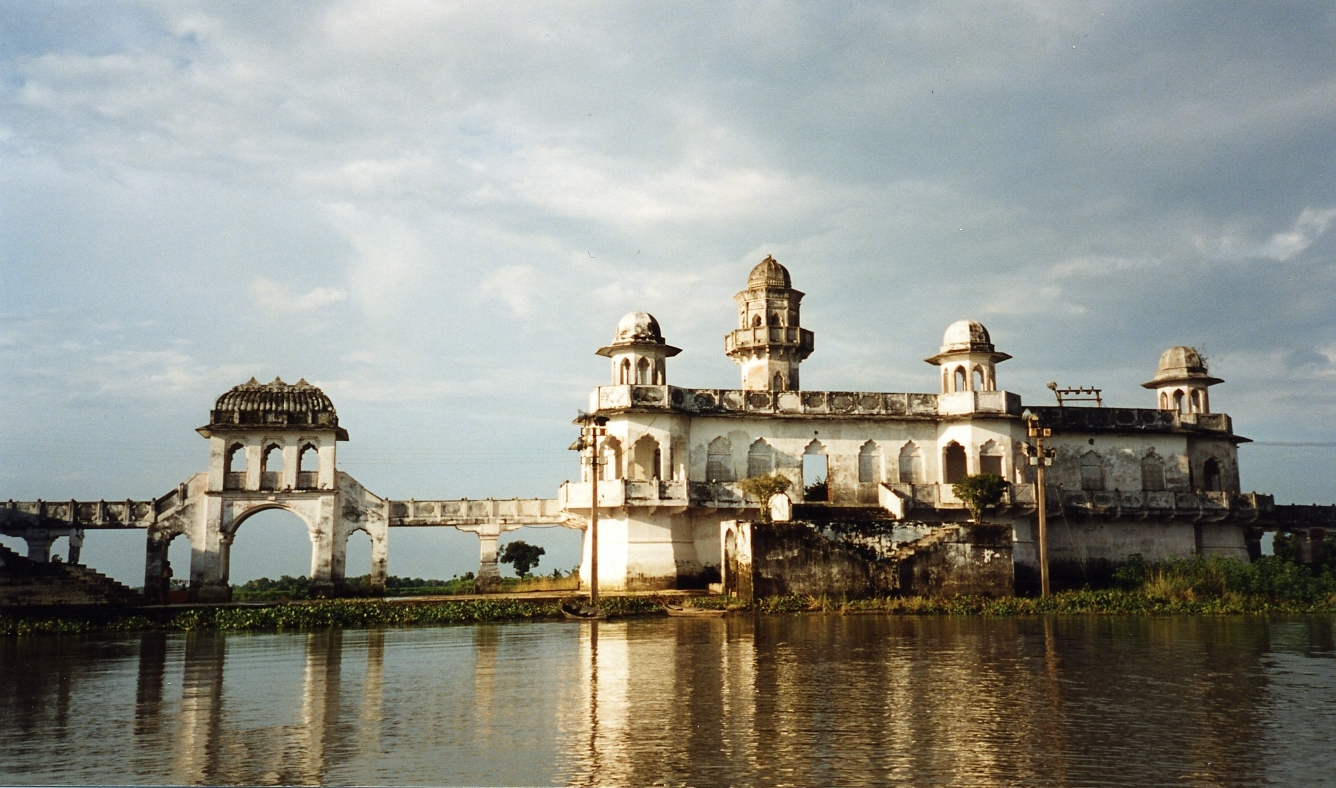
Neermahal Palace.

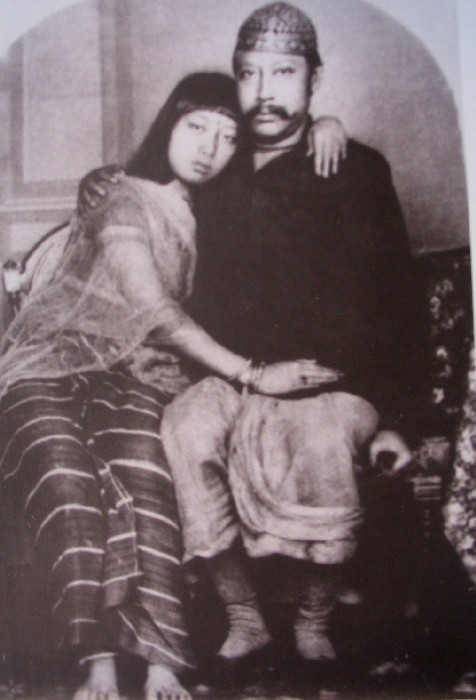
Maharaja Bir Chandra Manikya with Queen Manamohini

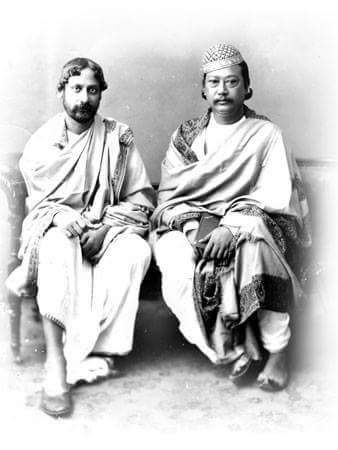
Tagore with Maharaja Radha Kishore in 1900

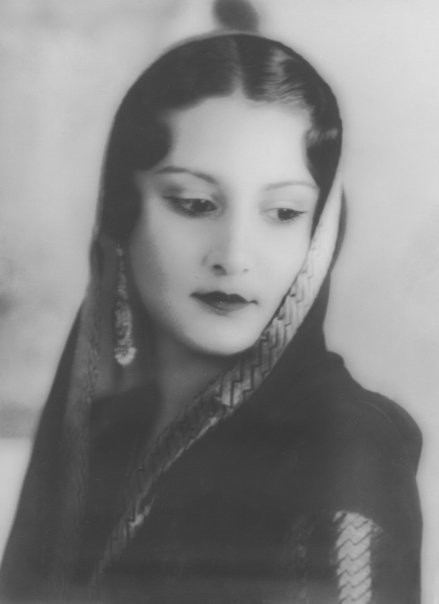
Queen Kanchan Prabha Devi who signed the instrument of accession as president of the Council of Regency

Kingdom of Tripura
- Part of History of Tripura
Kings of Tripura
Maha Manikya	c. 1400–1431
Dharma Manikya I	1431–1462
Ratna Manikya I	1462–1487
Pratap Manikya	1487
Vijaya Manikya I	1488
Mukut Manikya	1489
Dhanya Manikya	1490–1515
Dhwaja Manikya	1515–1520
Deva Manikya	1520–1530
Indra Manikya I	1530–1532
Vijaya Manikya II	1532–1563
Ananta Manikya	1563–1567
Udai Manikya I	1567–1573
Joy Manikya I	1573–1577
Amar Manikya	1577–1585
Rajdhar Manikya I	1586–1600
Ishwar Manikya	1600
Yashodhar Manikya	1600–1623
Interregnum	1623–1626
Kalyan Manikya	1626–1660
Govinda Manikya	1660–1661
Chhatra Manikya	1661–1667
Govinda Manikya	1661–1673
Rama Manikya	1673–1685
Ratna Manikya II	1685–1693
Narendra Manikya	1693–1695
Ratna Manikya II	1695–1712
Mahendra Manikya	1712–1714
Dharma Manikya II	1714–1725
Jagat Manikya	1725–1729
Dharma Manikya II	1729
Mukunda Manikya	1729–1739
Joy Manikya II	1739–1744
Indra Manikya II	1744–1746
Udai Manikya II	1744
Joy Manikya II	1746
Vijaya Manikya III	1746–1748
Lakshman Manikya	1740s/1750s
Interregnum	1750s–1760
Krishna Manikya	1760–1783
Rajdhar Manikya II	1785–1806
Rama Ganga Manikya	1806–1809
Durga Manikya	1809–1813
Rama Ganga Manikya	1813–1826
Kashi Chandra Manikya	1826–1829
Krishna Kishore Manikya	1829–1849
Ishan Chandra Manikya	1849–1862
Bir Chandra Manikya	1862–1896
Radha Kishore Manikya	1896–1909
Birendra Kishore Manikya	1909–1923
Bir Bikram Kishore Manikya	1923–1947
Kirit Bikram Kishore Manikya	1947–1949; 1949–1978 (titular)
Kirit Pradyot Manikya	1978–present (titular)

Tripura monarchy data
- Manikya dynasty (Royal family)
- Agartala (Capital of the kingdom)
- Ujjayanta Palace (Royal residence)
- Pushbanta Palace (Royal residence)
- Neermahal (Royal residence)
- Rajmala (Royal chronicle)
- Tripura Buranji (Chronicle)
- Chaturdasa Devata (Family deities)

Tripura State, also known as Hill Tipperah, was a princely state in India during the period of the British Raj and for some two years after the departure of the British. Its rulers belonged to the Manikya dynasty and until August 1947 the state was in a subsidiary alliance, from which it was released by the Indian Independence Act 1947. The state acceded to the newly independent Indian Union on 13 August 1947, and subsequently merged into the Indian Union in October 1949.

The princely state was located in the present-day Indian state of Tripura. The state included one town, Agartala, as well as a total of 1,463 villages. It had an area of 10,660 km^{2} and a population of 513,000 inhabitants in 1941.

== History ==
The predecessor state of Tripura was founded about 100 AD. According to legend, the Manikya dynasty derived its name from a jewel ('Mani' in Sanskrit) that had been obtained from a frog. The first king who ruled the state under the royal title of Manikya was Maharaja Maha Manikya, who ascended the throne in 1400. The kingdom is mentioned in Ming Shilu as Di-wu-la. It is further stated that it was occupied by Da-Gu-la, an unidentified state in what is Northern Myanmar or Assam. The Rajmala, a chronicle of the Kings of Tripura, was written in Bengali verse in the 15th century under Dharma Manikya I. The kingdom of Tripura reached its maximum expansion in the 16th century.

In 1764, when the British East India Company took control of Bengal, the parts of Bengal that had been under the Mughal Empire were taken over by the British administration. In 1809, Tripura became a British protectorate, and in 1838 the Rajas of Tripura were recognised by the British as sovereigns.

Between 1826 and 1862 the eastern part was subject to the ravages caused by Kuki invaders that plundered and destroyed villages and massacred their inhabitants.

There were troubles in every succession among the Tripura royal family members when the aspiring princes often resorted to use the services of the Kukis to cause disturbances. Thus in 1904, the British enacted a sanad that regulated permanently the succession of the royal family. Thenceforward the succession would have to be recognised by the Viceroy of India representing the British Crown.

Bir Chandra Manikya (1862–1896) modelled his administration on the pattern of British India, and enacted reforms including the foundation of the Agartala Municipal Corporation.

In 1905, Tripura became part of the new province of Eastern Bengal and Assam and was designated as 'Hill Tippera'. In addition to the Hill Tippera area, which corresponds to Tripura State, the kings retained a fertile estate known as Chakla Roshnabad with an area of 1476 km^{2}, located in the flatland of Noakhali, Sylhet and Tipperah districts; the latter is now mostly included in the Comilla District of Bangladesh.

King Bir Bikram Kishore Debbarma died in May 1947, shortly before Indian Independence. His son Kirit Bikram Kishore was a minor at that time, and, so, Maharani Kanchan Prava Devi presided over the Council of Regency formed to govern the state. On 13 August 1947, the Maharani signed the Instrument of Accession, joining the Indian Union. There was turmoil in the state in the succeeding months and several changes in the administrative structure took place in quick succession. Finally, on 9 September 1949, the Maharani signed the Merger Agreement with the Dominion of India, which became effective on 15 October, and Tripura became a centrally administered Part C State (Chief Commissioner's Province) of India.

Kirit Pradyot Deb Barman (b. 1978) was the son of the last King - and is the current titular monarch.

== Rulers ==
The head of the royal family of Tripura held the title of 'Maharaja' from 1919 onwards. Since 1897 the rulers were entitled to a 13 gun salute by the British authorities.

=== Rajas ===
• 1978 - **** Pradyot Bikram Manikya Deb Barma (Last King)

- 1684 – 1712 Ratna Manikya II (2nd time) (d. 1712)
- 1712 – 1714 Mahendra Manikya
- 1714 – 1732 Dharma Manikya II (1st time)
- 1732 – 1733 Jagat Manikya
- 1733 - Dharma Manikya II (2nd time)
- 1733 – 1737 Mukunda Manikya (d. 1739)
- 1737 – 1739 Jai Manikya II (1st time)
- 1739 – 174.. Indrasya Manikya II (1st time)
- 17.. – 174. Udai Manikya
- 174. – 174. Jai Manikya II (2nd time)
- 174. – 174. Indrasya Manikya II (2nd time)
- 174. – 1743 Jai Manikya II (3rd time)
- 1743 – 1760 Bijaya Manikya III
- c. 1748 – c. 1758 Shamsher Gazi -Regent (d. c. 1758)
- 1760 Lakshman Manikya (d. 1760)
- 1760 – 1761 Krishna Manikya (1st time) (d. 1783)
- 1761 – 1767 Balaram Manikya
- 1767 – 11 July 1783 Krishna Manikya (2nd time) (s.a.)
- 11 July 1783 – Mar 1804 Rajadhara Manikya II (d. 1804)
- 11 July 1783 – 1786 Jahnavi Rani Mahadevayu (f) - Regent
- Mar 1804 – 18 October 1809 Ramaganga Manikya (1st time) (b. 17.. – d. 1826)
- 18 October 1809 – 6 April 1813 Durga Manikya (b. 17.. – d. 1813)
- 6 April 1813 – 14 November 1826 Ramaganga Manikya (2nd time) (s.a.)
- 14 November 1826 – 19 March 1830 Kashichandra Manikya (d. 1830)
- 19 March 1830 – 3 April 1849 Krishna Kishore Manikya (d. 1849)
- 3 April 1849 – 31 July 1862 Ishanachandra Manikya (b. 1829 – d. 1862)
- 31 July 1862 – 11 December 1896 Bir Chandra Manikya (b. 1838 – d. 1896)
- 11 December 1896 – 12 March 1909 Radha Kishore Manikya (b. 1857 – d. 1909)
- 12 March 1909 – 1 January 1919 Birendra Kishore Manikya (b. 1883 – d. 1923)

=== Maharajas ===
- 1 January 1919 – 13 August 1923 Birendra Kishore Manikya
- 17 August 1923 – 17 May 1947 Bir Bikram Kishore Manikya (born 1908, died 1947) (after 3 June 1935 called Sir Bir Bikram Kishore Manikya)
- 17 May 1947 – 15 October 1949 Manikya Kirit Bikram Kishore Deb Burman, a minor (born 1933 – died 2006) - reigned as a titular ruler until his death, but unrecognised after 1971 by the Indian Government
- 17 May 1947 – 15 October 1949 Maharani Kanchan Prava Devi, Regent (born 1914, died 1973)

=== Dewans (chief ministers) ===
- 1850 – 1857 Balaram Hazari
- 18.. – 18.. Braja Mohan Thakur
- 18.. – 1873 Dinabandhu Thakur
- Jul 1873 – 1877 Nilmoni Das
- 1877 – 1880 Sambhu Chandra Mukherjee
- 1880 – 1883 Absent
- 1883 Prince Radha Kishore Manikya
- 1883 – 1886 Dhanajaya Thakur
- 1886 (3 months) Babu Dinanath Sen
- 1886 – November 1888 Rai Bahadur Mohini Mohan Bardhan
- November 1888 – 1890? The Raja
- 1890 – 1892 Rai Umakanta Das Bahadur (1st time)
- 1892 – 1901? Dinabandhu Thakur
- 1901 – 1905 Rai Umakanta Das Bahadur (2nd time)
- November 1905 – February 1907 Shri Ramani Mohan Chattopadhyaya
- February 1907 – December 1908 Rai Umakanta Das Bahadur (3rd time)
- December 1908 – 7 November 1909 Sirjukta Babu Annada Charan Gupta
- November 1909 – 1914 Nabadwip Chandra Deb Barma (b. 1854 – d. 1931)
- 1914 – 1915 Brajendra Kishore Deb Barma (b. 1880 – d. 19..) (1st time)
- 1915 – 1923 Srijut Babu Prasanna Kumar Deb Barma
- 9 December 1923 – 19 August 1927 Nabadwipchandra Dev Burma (s.a.) (1st time)
- 1927 – 1929 Jyotis Chandra Sen (1st time)
- 17 May 1929 – 1931? Nabadwip chandra Dev Burma (s.a.) (2nd time)
- 1931 – 28 August 1932 B.K. Sen
- 28 August 1932 – 20 November 1932 Manyabara Rana Bodhjung Bahadur (b. 1894 – d. 1946)
- 20 Nov 1932 – 1939/40 Jyotis Chandra Sen (2nd time)
- 1939/40 – 18 November 1946 Manyabara Rana Bodhjung Bahadur
- November 1946 – 1947 Brajendra Kishore Deb Barma (s.a.) (2nd time)
- 1947 S.V. Mukherjee
- 20 December 1947 – 15 October 1949 Abani Bhushan Chatterjee

==== British political agents ====
- 3 July 1871 – February 1874 Ambrose William Bushe Power (b. 18.. – d. 1907)
- 11 February 1874 – May 1875 Edward Gordon Lillingston
- 27 May 1875 – February 1876 W.L. Samuels
- 22 August 1876 – April 1877 Thomas Edward Coxhead (b. 1842 – d. 1890)
- February 1877 – April 1877 James Francis Bradbury (acting for Coxhead)
- 26 April 1877 – 28 October 1878 C.W. Bolton
- 1878 – 1879 F. Jones
- 1879 – 1882 G. Toynbee

== Symbols ==
=== Flag ===
The flag features the coat of arms, on a background of yellow and red.

=== Coat of arms ===
The motto is "Bir ta Saramekam" (Courage is the thing which is most needed or no one is better than a warrior).

== See also ==
- Eastern States Agency
- Political integration of India
- Tripura Merger Agreement
- Tripura Buranji
