= Kishor Singh =

Raja of Panna (1798–1834)

- Raja

Raja of Panna
- Reign: c. 1798 – c. 1834
- Predecessor: Dhokal Singh
- Successor: Harbans Rai
- Died: c. 1834
Names
- Kishor Singh Ju Deo
- House: Panna
- Dynasty: Bundela

Kishor Singh was the Raja of Panna from 1798 until his death in 1834.

== Biography ==
Following the death of Dhokal Singh in 1798, he succeeded him on the throne of Panna. However, his rule was nominal, as he was actually in exile. It was not until the arrival of the British in Bundelkhand that they reinstated him and confirmed his possessions by granting him sanads in 1807 and 1811. The sanad of 1807 was granted to him when, through his minister, Rajdhar Gaj Singh, he acknowledged British supremacy on 4 February 1807. By this sanad, he was confirmed in possession of 802 villages and three parganas. However, many of these villages were occupied by others who were unwilling to relinquish them. With the aid of the British Government, he not only recovered those villages but also many others not listed in the sanad. As a result, the British government issued a new sanad confirming his perpetual possession of a total of 1,363 villages.

Throughout his reign, the British continued interfering in the affairs of his state on account of his oppressive government. In 1823, he entrusted the management of his dominions to Kunwar Pratap Singh of Chhatarpur for four years. However, before the four years had passed, and as his conduct remained the same, the British Government intervened, deposed him, and expelled him from Panna. His son, Harbans Rai, was then appointed as regent to administer state affairs.

He died in 1834 and was succeeded by Harbans Rai. On the occasion of his death, two of his wives committed sati.
