= Kharchi =

Gods of the Tripuri people

Kharchi are the Gods of the Tripuri people.

== See also ==
- Tripura
- Tripuri culture
