= Comilla Division =

Proposed division in Bangladesh

Comilla Division কুমিল্লা বিভাগ
- Proposed Division
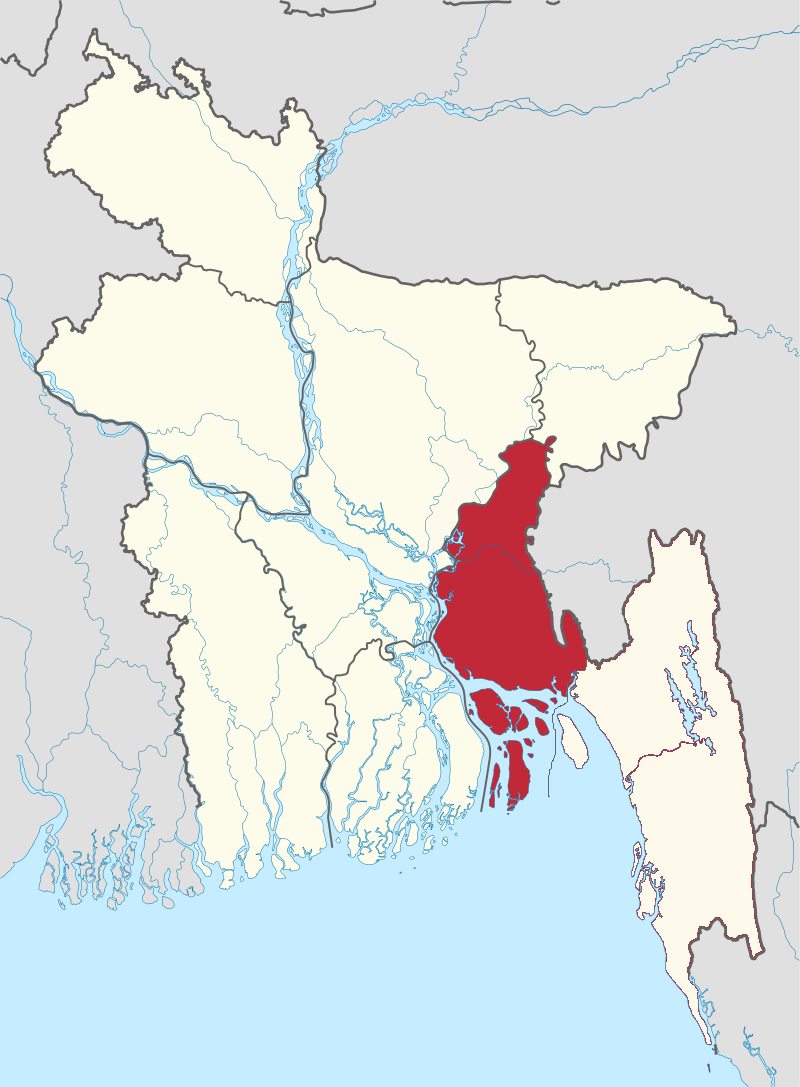
- Interactive map of Comilla Division
- Coordinates: 23°27′N 91°12′E
- Country: Bangladesh
- Capital: Comilla

Area
  - Total: 12,848.53 km^{2} (4,960.85 sq mi)

Population (2022 census)
  - Total: 19,936,259
  - Density: 1,551.637/km^{2} (4,018.722/sq mi)
- (Bangladesh Bureau of Statistics)
- Time zone: UTC+6 (BST)
- ISO 3166 code: BD-B
- Main Language(s): Bengali
- Other languages: English
- Districts: 6
- Upazilas: 56

Comilla Division (Bengali: কুমিল্লা বিভাগ) is a proposed administrative division within Bangladesh. The division gets its name from the Comilla, which forms its western border. It encompasses the north-western parts of the existing Chittagong Division, comprises Brahmanbaria, Comilla, Chandpur, Noakhali, Feni, and Laxmipur Districts of Chittagong Division. The headquarters of the division would be in Comilla. It's located in the south-east region of the country, with a total area of 12,848.53 km^{2} (4,960.85 sq mi) and a population of 19,936,259 according to the 2022 Census.

== Terminology and naming dispute ==
Various terms are used to describe the different (and sometimes overlapping) geographical and political areas of the proposed Meghna division. In brief, the main terms and their simple explanations are as follows:

- Geographical terms:
- Samatata (or Samatat) (Bengali: সমতট) was an ancient geopolitical division of Bengal. Greater Comilla and Noakhali region were within the division of Samatata. Geographically, the proposed Meghna division is made up of two former greater districts of Bengal province– Comilla and Noakhali.
  - Greater Comilla (Bengali: কুমিল্লা): Established as the Tippera or Tipperah district of Bengal by the British in 1790 and later renamed as Comilla in 1960. It included the Sub-divisions of Brahmanbaria and Chandpur which eventually became separate districts in 1984.
  - Greater Noakhali (Bengali: নোয়াখালী): The ancient name of Noakhali is Bhulua. The Bhulua district was created by the British Indian Government in 1821. Later officially renamed Noakhali in 1868. It included the Sub-divisions of Lakshmipur and Feni which eventually became separate districts in 1984.
- Roshanbad (or Rowshanabad) (Bengali: রসানবাদ): (roughly equating to the proposed Comilla Division, excluding Rangamati Hill District). It was a district level administrative unit (Chakla) in Bengal Subah during Mughal period.
- Comilla (Bengali: কুমিল্লা): After the outcust of Sheikh Hasina, On 17 December 2024, the Public Administration Reform Commission of the Interim government of Bangladesh recommended the creation of the Cumilla division.

== History ==
The undivided Comilla district region was once under ancient Gangaridai, Samatata and Pundra Kingdom of Bengal. The region came under the control of Gauda Kingdom after the fall of Gupta rule in 6th century. Lalmai Mainamati was ruled by Khadga dynasty (seventh century to early eighth century AD), Deva dynasty (eighth century AD) and Chandra dynasty (during tenth and mid-eleventh century AD). After the reign of Chandras, the region was ruled by Hindu Varman, Sena and Deva dynasty in the early mediaeval period. Later the region was joined with Twipra Kingdom in the mediaeval period. In 1732, it became the center of the Bengal-backed domain of Jagat Manikya.

The Peasants Movement against the king of Tripura in 1764, which originally formed under the leadership of Shamsher Gazi. It came under the rule of East India Company in 1765 and was established as Tippera district (also known as Chakla Roshanbad) in 1790. Later, it was reorganized in three phases into six districts. The undivided Noakhali District was established in 1868 as a renaming of the Bhola District, which the British founded on 29 March 1822. It headquarters was in the town of Noakhali until the town vanished in the river-bed in 1951, as a result of the Meghna River erosion. A new headquarters for the Noakhali District was then established at Maijdee.

On 14 February 2017, a new division was proposed to be created comprising the Greater Comilla and Noakhali regions, effectively named Maynamati. The "Maynamati" name was controversial and therefore protested by Comilla residents the following day. The proposed name was later changed to Meghna on 22 November 2022, after the Meghna River that flows through the region. Then Bangladesh former Prime Minister Sheikh Hasina clarified earlier on 21 October 2021 that she does not want a division named "Comilla", or any division starting with the "Ku" syllable, during the inauguration ceremony of the Awami League office in the city, as Mostaq's name was associated with Comilla according to her. Despite this, the name change to "Meghna" saw mixed reactions. The Bangladesh Nationalist Party stated that the AL government was imposing its decisions onto the people, and would rename the division to Comilla once they are elected in the 2024 general election. The proposal was postponed on 27 November. Later on 30 November 2024, Youth and Sports Adviser Asif Mahmud announced the resuming of the establishment of the division, this time using the Comilla name.

== Administrative districts ==
The Division will be subdivided into six districts (zilas) and thence into 56 (upazilas). The six districts listed below compose the north-western portion (with 37.6% of the area, but 58.3% of the population) of the present Chittagong Division, while the remaining five districts (zilas) compose the south-eastern portion (62.4% of the area, 41.7% of the population), being separated by the lower (or Bangladeshi) stretch of the Feni River.

Name	Capital	Area (km^{2})	Population 1991 Census	Population 2001 Census	Population 2011 Census	Population 2022 Census
Brahmanbaria District	Brahmanbaria	1,927.11	2,268,000	2,509,383	2,953,208	3,403,786
Comilla District	Comilla	3,085.17	4,264,000	4,807,649	5,602,624	6,394,875
Chandpur District	Chandpur	1,704.06	2,150,000	2,377,088	2,513,838	2,713,247
Lakshmipur District	Laxmipur	1,440.39	1,391,000	1,558,618	1,797,761	1,994,930
Noakhali District	Maijdee	4,202.87	2,346,000	2,696,453	3,231,832	3,732,042
Feni District	Feni	990.36	1,158,000	1,297,987	1,496,139	1,697,379
Total Division	6	13,349.96	13,577,000	15,247,175	17,595,402	19,936,259

== Demographics ==
The division would have a population of 19,936,259 based on the 2024 Census, leaving 14,242,353 in the residual Chittagong Division (which is to be renamed Chattogram Division). The estimate for 2025 for the Comilla Division is about 20.2 million. In 2011, 94.62% were Muslims and 5.32% were Hindus.

== See also ==
- Faridpur Division
