= Panna State =

Princely state of India

Coordinates: 24.27°N 80.17°E

- Princely State of British India
- 1731–1950
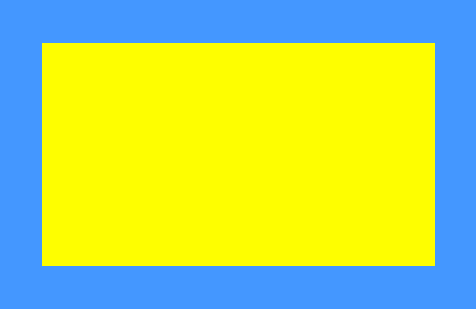
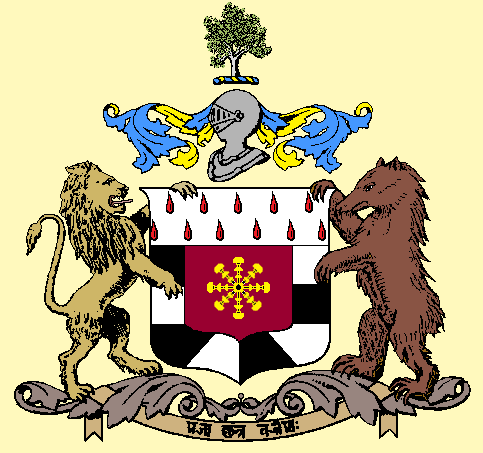
- Flag Coat of arms

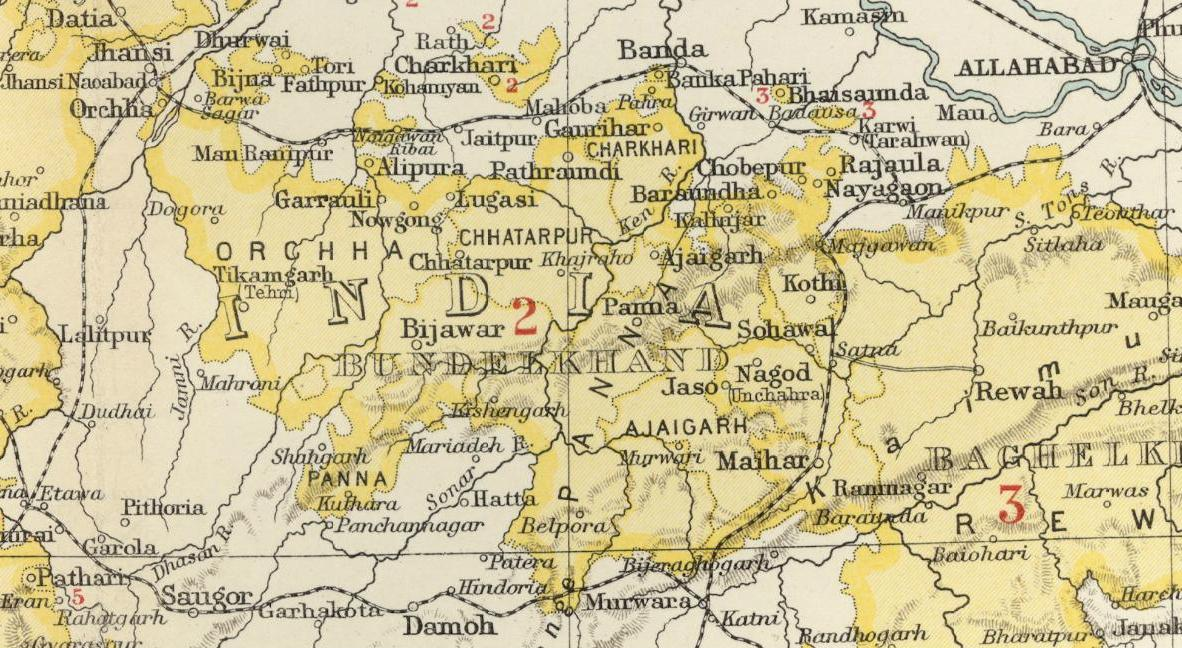
- Panna State in the Imperial Gazetteer of India
- Capital: Panna
- Area
  - 1931: 6,724 km^{2} (2,596 sq mi)
- Population
  - 1931: 212,130
- History
  - Established: 1731
  - Accession to India: 1950
Succeeded by
India

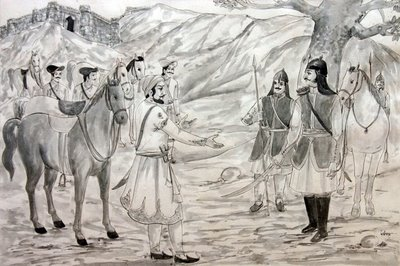
Chhatrasal, the founder of Panna State, together with Maratha leader Shivaji.

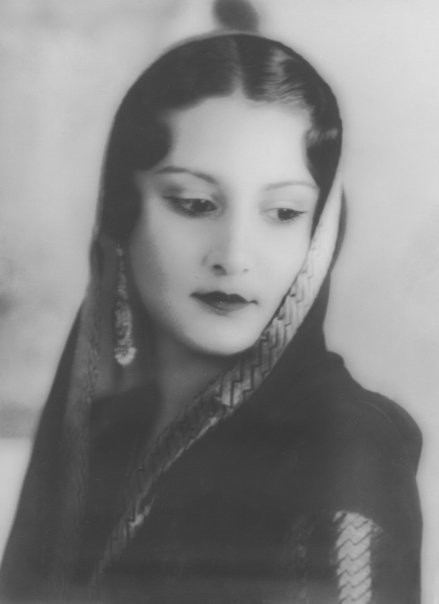
Queen Kanchan Prabha Devi, wife of Maharaja of Tripura , Bir Bikram Kishore Debbarman and regent (1947–1949), was the daughter of Maharaja Yadvendra Singh of Panna

Panna State was a kingdom and later princely state of colonial India, located in modern Panna district of Madhya Pradesh.

The state of Panna belonged to the Bundelkhand Agency and covered an area of, 6724 km^{2} with 1,008 villages within its borders in 1901. It took its name from the chief town in the area, Panna, which was the capital of the state.

== History ==
A predecessor state was founded by one of the Raj Gond chiefs of the area around 1450. Almost three centuries later Panna was the capital chosen by a leader Chhatar Sal, the founder of Panna State, after leading a revolt against the Mughal Empire. He established an alliance with the Maratha Peshwa and made Panna his capital. After conquering Mahoba in 1680 Chhatar Sal extended his rule over most of Bundelkhand. Upon his death in 1731, his kingdom was divided among his sons, with one-third of the kingdom going to his son-in-law, the Peshwa Baji Rao I.

The Kingdom of Panna went to Harde Sah, the eldest son of Chhatar Sal. In the early 19th century, Panna became a princely state of British India, and gained control of the states of Nagod and Sohawal. Raja Nirpat Singh assisted the British in the Revolt of 1857, and the British rewarded him with the title Maharaja.

Maharaja Madho Singh was deposed by the Viceroy in April 1902, after a commission found him guilty of poisoning his uncle, Rao Raja Khuman Singh, the previous year.

Maharaja Mahendra Yadvendra Singh acceded to the Government of India on 1 January 1950, and the kingdom became Panna District of the new Indian state of Vindhya Pradesh. Vindhya Pradesh was merged into Madhya Pradesh on 1 November 1956.

== Rulers ==
The rulers of the state were entitled to an 11-gun salute by the British authorities.

=== Rajas ===
- 1675–1731: Raja Chhatrasal
- 1731–1739: Harde Sah (d. 1739)
- 1739–1752: Sabha Singh (d. 1752)
- 1752–1758: Aman Singh (d. 1758)
- 1758–1777: Hindupat Singh (d. 1777)
- 1777–1779: Anirudh Singh (d. 1779)
- 1779–1785: interregnum
- 1785–1798: Dhokal Singh
- 1798–1834: Kishor Singh (d. 1834)
- 1834–1849: Harbans Rai
- 1849–1869: Nirpat Singh (d. 1870)

=== Maharajas ===
- 1869 – Jun 1870: Nirpat Singh (s.a.)
- 9 Jun 1870 – 1893: Rudra Pratap Singh (b. 1848 – d. 1893) (from 1 Jan 1876, Sir Rudra Pratap Singh)
- 1893 – 9 Mar 1898: Lokpal Singh (d. 1898)
- 9 Mar 1898 – 22 Apr 1902: Madho Singh (d. af.1925)
- 20 Jun 1902 – 15 Aug 1947 Yadvendra Singh Judeo (b. 1893 – d. 1963)

=== Titular Maharajas ===
- 1947–1963: Yadvendra Singh Judeo
- 1963–1971: Narendra Singh Judeo

After abolition of all royal titles and privy purse in 1971.

- 1971–1998: Narendra Singh Judeo
- 1998–2009: Manvendra Singh Judeo
- 2009–2023: Raghavendra Singh Judeo

== See also ==
- Chaube Jagirs
- Jaitpur State
- Nagod State
- Political integration of India
- Bijawar-Panna Plateau
- Bundela
