= Kirit Bikram Kishore Deb Barman =

Tripura royalty and politician (b. 1933, d. 2006)

Kirit Bikram Kishore Manikya DebBarma Bahadur Maharaja

Member of the India Parliament
- In office 1967–1971
- Preceded by: Dasarath Debbarma
- Succeeded by: Dasarath Debbarma
- Constituency: Tripura East

Titular Maharaja of Tripura
- In office 17 May 1947 – 28 November 2006
- Preceded by: Bir Bikram Kishore Manikya Bahadur
- Succeeded by: Pradyot Bikram Manikya Deb Barma

Personal details
- Born: 13 December 1933 Calcutta, Bengal Presidency, British India
- Died: 28 November 2006 (aged 72) Kolkata, West Bengal, India
- Party: Indian National Congress
- Spouse: Bibhu Kumari Devi
- Relations: See Manikya dynasty
- Children: Pradyot Bikram Manikya Deb Barma
- Parents: Bir Bikram Kishore Manikya Bahadur (father); Kanchan Prava Devi (mother)
- Education: Mayo College, Allahabad University

Maharaja Kirit Bikram Kishore Manikya DebBarma Bahadur (13 December 1933 – 28 November 2006) was the 185th and last King of Tripura, a princely state in northeastern India. His formal coronation was held in 1941, but he never gained the powers of a king.

== Political career ==
He succeeded his father, Maharaja Bir Bikram Kishore Debbarma, in 1947. He was the nominal king for two years until the state's merger into India in 1949. Since he was a minor during this time, the state was governed by a Council of Regency headed by his mother, Kanchan Prava Devi.

He was elected from Tripura East Lok Sabha seat on an Indian National Congress ticket and was elected thrice in 1967, 1977 and 1989.

== Personal life ==
He was born on 13 December 1933 in Calcutta to Maharaja Bir Bikram Kishore Debbarma Manikya Bahadur, who was Maharaja of Tripura State, and Kanchan Prava Devi, daughter of the HH Sir Maharaja Yadvendra Singh, the King of Panna State.

He was married to Padmavati Raje 'Akkasaheb' Scindia (1942–64) eldest daughter of Maharaja Jivajirao Scindia of Gwalior State and Vijaya Raje Scindia, who died in 1965, in Kolkata. Later, he married Bibhu Kumari Devi, daughter to Raja Lav Shah. They had one son and two daughters. His wife and son Pradyot Bikram Manikya DebBarma were also members of the Indian National Congress. One of his daughters, Pragya DebBarma also contested election from Tripura East Lok Sabha seat in 2019 Indian general election.

== See also ==
- Manikya dynasty#List of kings
- Tripura (princely state)#Maharajas
