= Mahendra =

Sanskrit epithet and masculine name

Mahendra (Sanskrit: महेन्द्र, romanized: Mahendra) is a Sanskrit compound word deriving from mahā (great) and indra (the title of the king of the devas) from Hinduism. It has been used in compound royal styles.

== History and politics ==
=== Royalty ===
- Mahendra or Mahinda – the son of Emperor Ashoka and a promoter of Buddhism
- Mahendravarman I – (Tamil: மகேந்திரவர்மன் 600–630 CE), Pallava king who ruled the Northern regions of what forms present-day Tamil Nadu in India in the early 7th century.
- Mahindu, 10th century Chahamana king of north-western India
- Mahendra of Nepal – king of Nepal from 1955 to 1972

=== Elected office ===
- Mahinda Rajapaksa – President of Democratic Socialist Republic of Sri Lanka from 2005 to 2015
- Mahendra Chaudhry – Fijian politician and the leader of the Fiji Labour Party
- Upul Mahendra (born 1971), Sri Lankan politician
- Sang Made Mahendra Jaya – Retired Indonesian National Police Officer, Acting Governor of Bali from 2023 to 2025 and Inspector General of the Ministry of Home Affairs of Indonesia since 2025
- Yusril Ihza Mahendra – Indonesian politician, former leader of the Crescent Star Party and Coordinating Ministry for Legal, Human Rights, Immigration, and Correction of Indonesia since 2024.
- Mahendra Gondeea, Mauritian politician
- Mahendra Singh Mahra, Indian politician

== Entertainment ==
=== Film ===
- Balu Mahendra – director of Tamil films
- Y. G. Mahendra – an Indian actor, singer playwright and comedian

=== Music ===
- Mahendra Kapoor – Bollywood singer

=== Sports ===
- Mahendra Singh Dhoni – Indian cricketer, former Captain of Indian Cricket Team
- Mahendra Nagamootoo – West Indian cricketer

== Business ==
- Mahendra Kumar

== See also ==
- Raja Mahendra, royal style; and name
