= Official residence =

Residence of head of state

An official residence is a residence designated by an authority and assigned to an official (such as a head of state, head of government, governor or other senior figures), and may be the same place where the office holder conducts their work functions or lives.

== List of official residences, by country ==
=== Africa ===
==== Algeria ====
- El Mouradia Presidential Palace

==== Angola ====
- Presidential Palace

==== Benin ====
- Presidential Palace

==== Botswana ====
- State House (President)

==== Burundi ====
- Kiriri Presidential Palace

==== Cameroon ====
- Unity Palace

==== Cape Verde ====
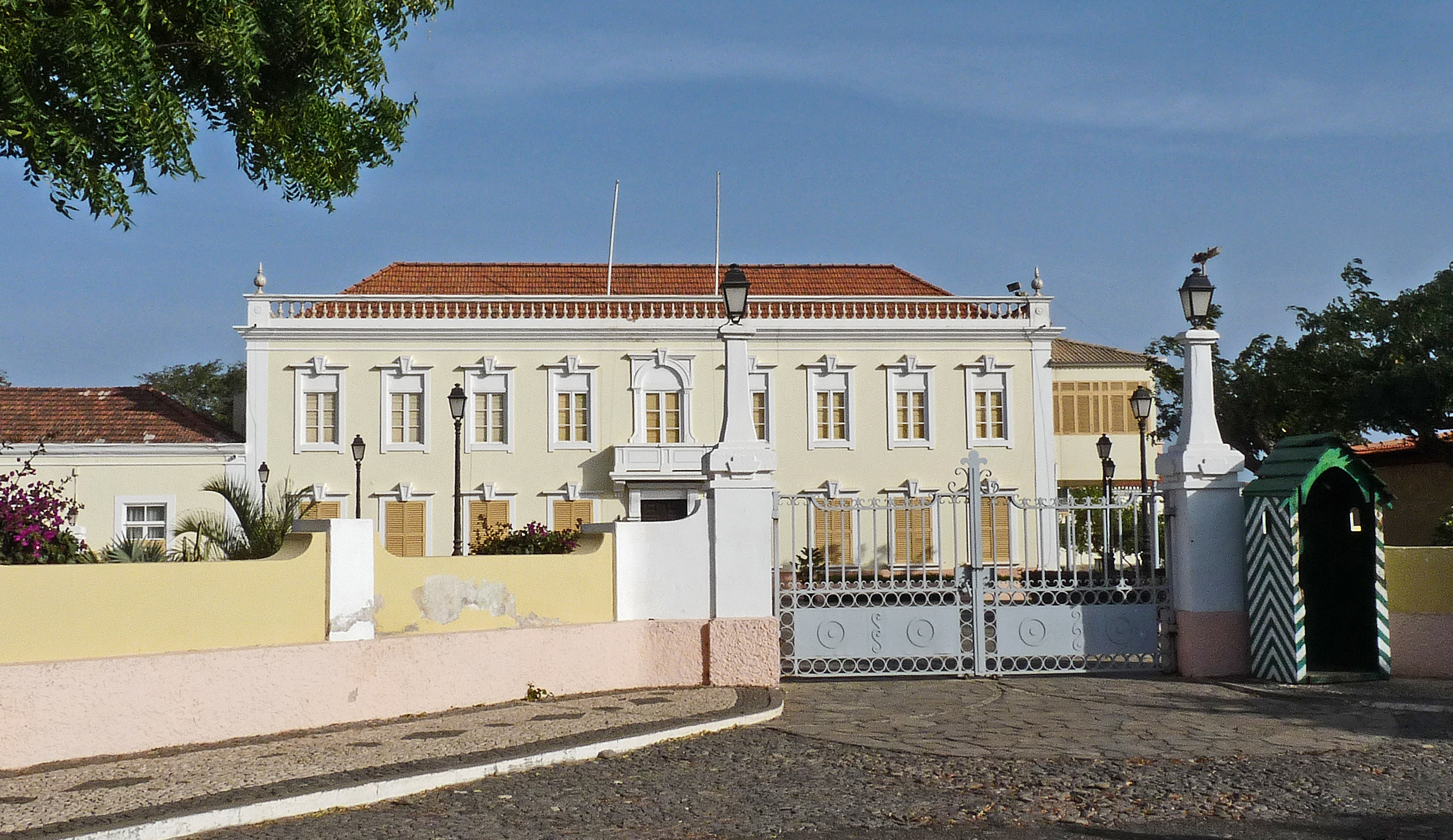
Presidential Palace of Cape Verde

- Palácio Presidencial

==== Central African Republic ====
- Renaissance Palace

==== Chad ====
- Presidential Palace

==== Comoros ====
- Presidential Palace

==== Congo-Kinshasa ====
- Palais de la Nation

===== Former =====
- Palais du mont Ngaliema (residence of Mobutu Sese Seko)
- Palais de Marbre (residence of Laurent-Désiré Kabila)

==== Congo-Brazzaville ====
- Brazzaville Presidential Palace

==== Djibouti ====
- Presidential Palace

==== Egypt ====
- Abdeen Palace
- Heliopolis Palace
- Koubbeh Palace
- Montaza Palace
- Ras el-Tin Palace

==== Equatorial Guinea ====
- Malabo Government Building

==== Eritrea ====
- Asmara President's Office

==== Eswatini ====
- Lozitha Palace (King)

==== Ethiopia ====
- National Palace (President)
- Imperial Palace (Prime Minister)

==== Gabon ====
- Presidential Palace

==== Gambia ====
- State House (President)

==== Ghana ====
- Osu Castle formal (Presidential) residence
- Golden Jubilee House current (Presidential) residence
- Peduase Lodge (Presidential) retreat

==== Guinea ====
- Presidential Palace
- Villa Syli (official guest house)

===== Former =====
- Belle Vue (demolished; former summer residence of the President)

==== Guinea-Bissau ====
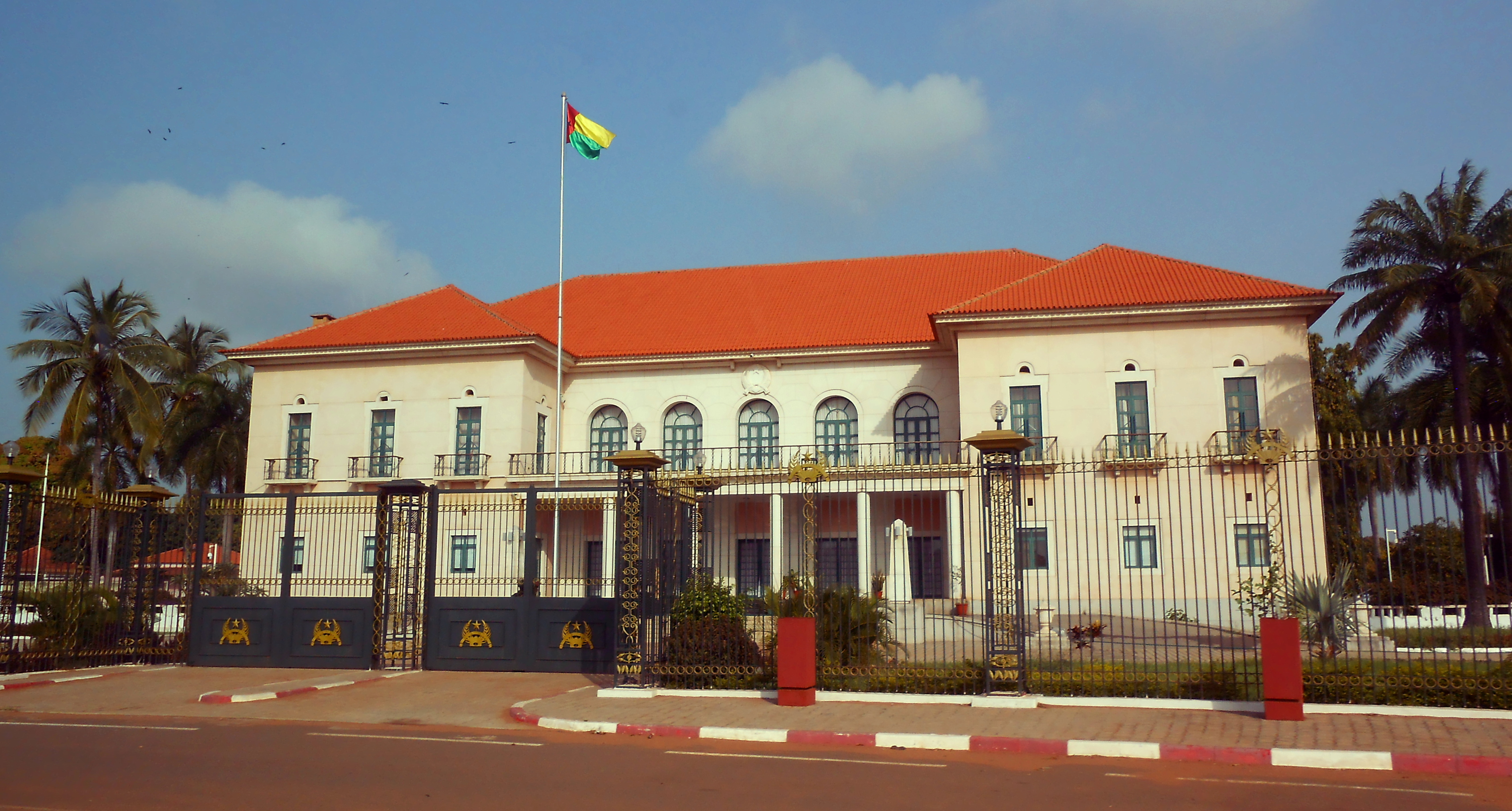
Presidential Palace, Bissau

- Presidential Palace

==== Ivory Coast ====
- Le Palais de la Présidence (President)

==== Kenya ====
- State House (President)

==== Lesotho ====
- Royal Palace (King)
- State House (Prime Minister)

==== Liberia ====
- Executive Mansion (President)

==== Libya ====
- Al-Sikka, Tripoli (Government of National Unity)
- Al Nasr Convention Centre (General National Congress, formerly)
- Dar al-Salam Hotel (House of Representatives)
- Abusita Navy Base (Presidential Council)
- Royal Palace of Tripoli (King, formerly)
- Bab al-Azizia (Leader and Guide of the Revolution, formerly)

==== Madagascar ====
- Iavoloha
- Ambohitsorohitra

==== Malawi ====
- Sanjika Palace (President)
- New State House (President)

==== Mali ====
- Presidential Palace

==== Mauritania ====
- Presidential Palace

==== Mauritius ====
- State House (President)
- Clarisse House (Prime Ministers)

==== Morocco ====
- Dar al-Makhzen, Rabat (main residence)
- Dar al-Makhzen, Fez
- Dar al-Makhzen, Marrakesh
- Dar al-Makhzen, Meknes
- Marchane Palace, Tangier
- Bahia Palace, Marrakesh

==== Mozambique ====
- Palácio da Ponta Vermelha (President)

==== Namibia ====
- State House (President)

==== Niger ====
- Presidential Palace

==== Nigeria ====
===== Federal =====
- Aso Villa (President)

===== State =====
- Lagos State:
  Lagos House (Governor)
- Rivers State:
  Government House (Governor)

==== Rwanda ====
- Urugwiro

==== São Tomé and Príncipe ====
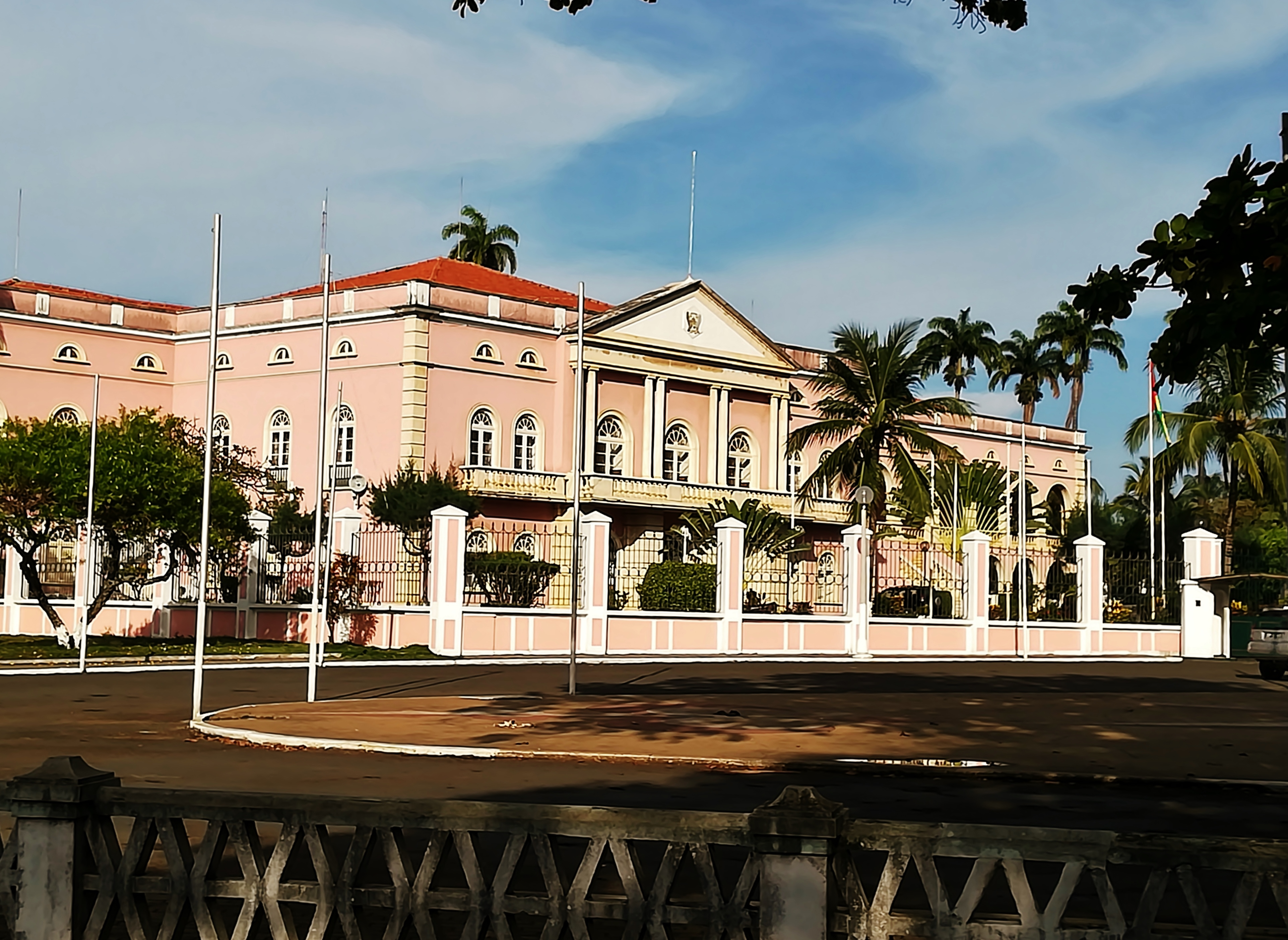
Presidential Palace of São Tomé e Príncipe

- Presidential Palace

==== Senegal ====
- Palais de la Republique (President)

==== Seychelles ====
- State House (President)

==== Sierra Leone ====
- State House (President)

==== Somalia ====
- Villa Somalia (President)

==== Somaliland ====
- Presidential palace (President)

==== South Africa ====
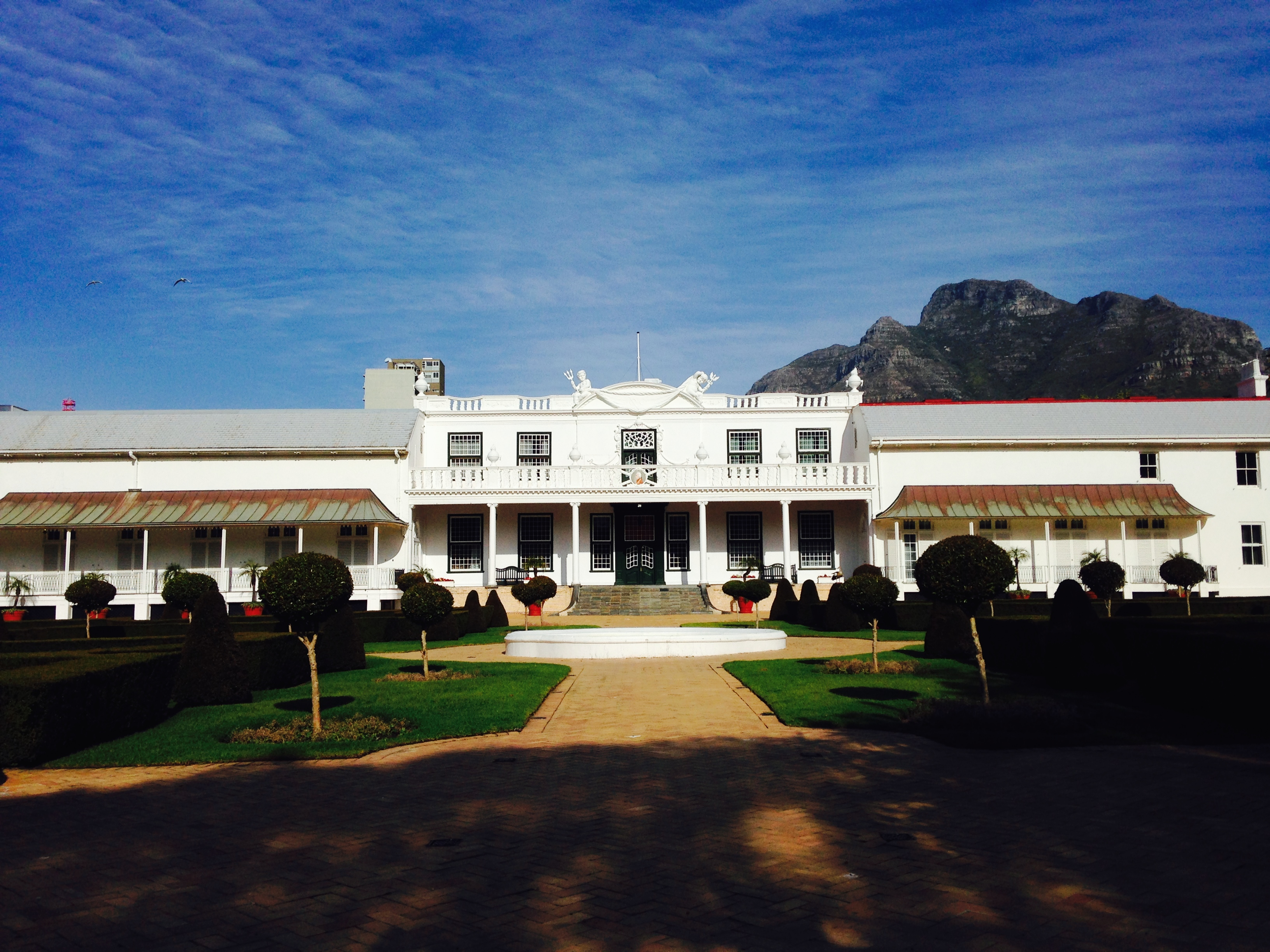
The Tuynhuys, official residence of the President in Cape Town.

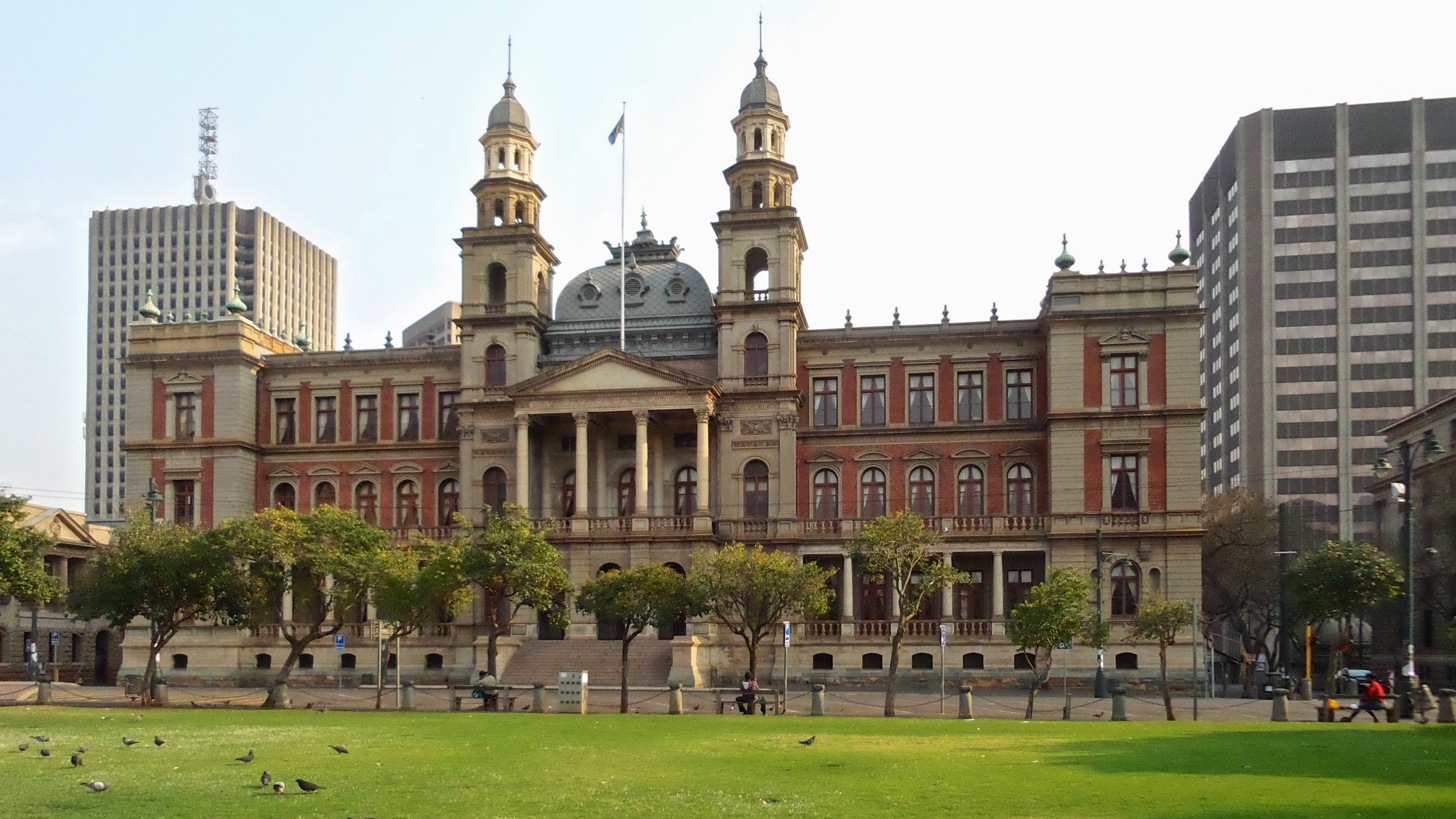
Palace of Justice in Pretoria

- Mahlamba Ndlopfu (Libertas), Pretoria (President)
- Genadendal Residence, Cape Town (President)
- Tuynhuys, Cape Town (President)

===== Provincial =====
- Free State:
  - Free State House (Premier)
- Gauteng:
  - Bryanston Mansion (Premier)
  - Oliver Tambo House (Deputy President)
  - Palace of Justice (Parliament)
- KwaZulu-Natal:
  - King's House (President and Deputy President)
- Western Cape:
  - Leeuwenhof (Premier)
  - Highstead (Deputy President)

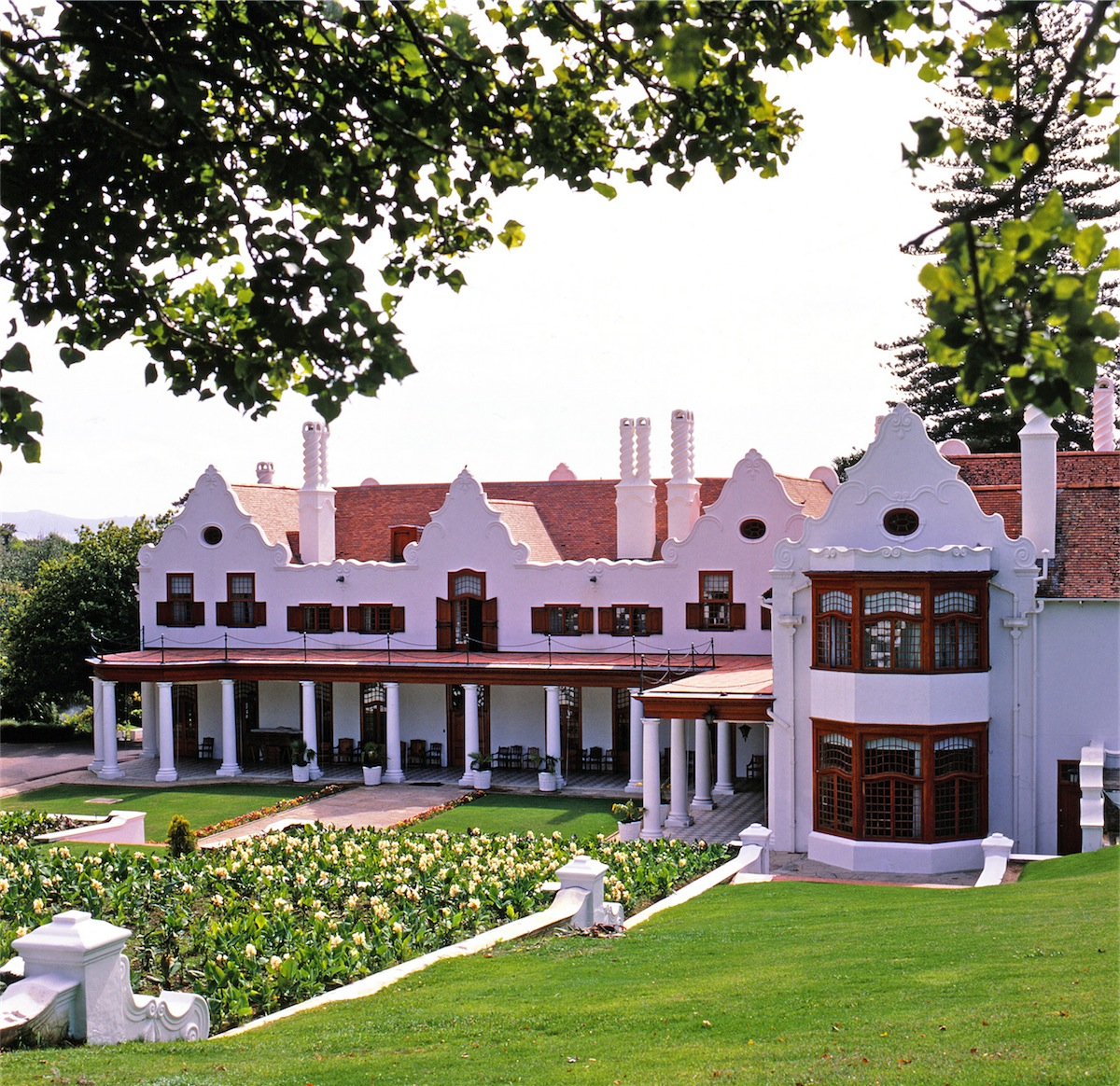
Groote Schuur, the former Presidential residence in Cape Town

===== Provincial, former =====
- Cape Province:
  - Government House (Governor, formerly; kept as offices for Prime Minister)
  - Groote Schuur (President, formerly, also as residence to Prime Minister)
- Transvaal:
  - Government House (Lieutenant General, formerly)
- Natal:
  - Government House (Lieutenant-Governor, formerly)
- Orange Free State:
  - Government House (Governor, formerly)
  - Old Presidency (President of the Orange Free State)

==== South Sudan ====
- Presidential Palace

==== Sudan ====
- Republican Palace

==== Tanzania ====
- State House (President)

==== Togo ====
- The Palace of the Governors

==== Tunisia ====
- Carthage Palace

==== Uganda ====
- State House (President)

==== Zambia ====
- State House (President)

==== Zimbabwe ====
- State House (President)

=== Asia ===
==== Afghanistan ====
- Arg (Cabinet)

==== Bahrain ====
- Rifa'a Palace (King)
- Al-Sakhir Palace (King)
- Shaikh Isa Palace (King)
- Al Rawda Palace (King)
- Al-Qudaibiya Palace (Prime Minister)

==== Bangladesh ====
- Bangabhaban (President)

==== Bhutan ====
- Dechencholing Palace (King)

==== Brunei ====
- Istana Nurul Iman (Sultan)

==== Cambodia ====
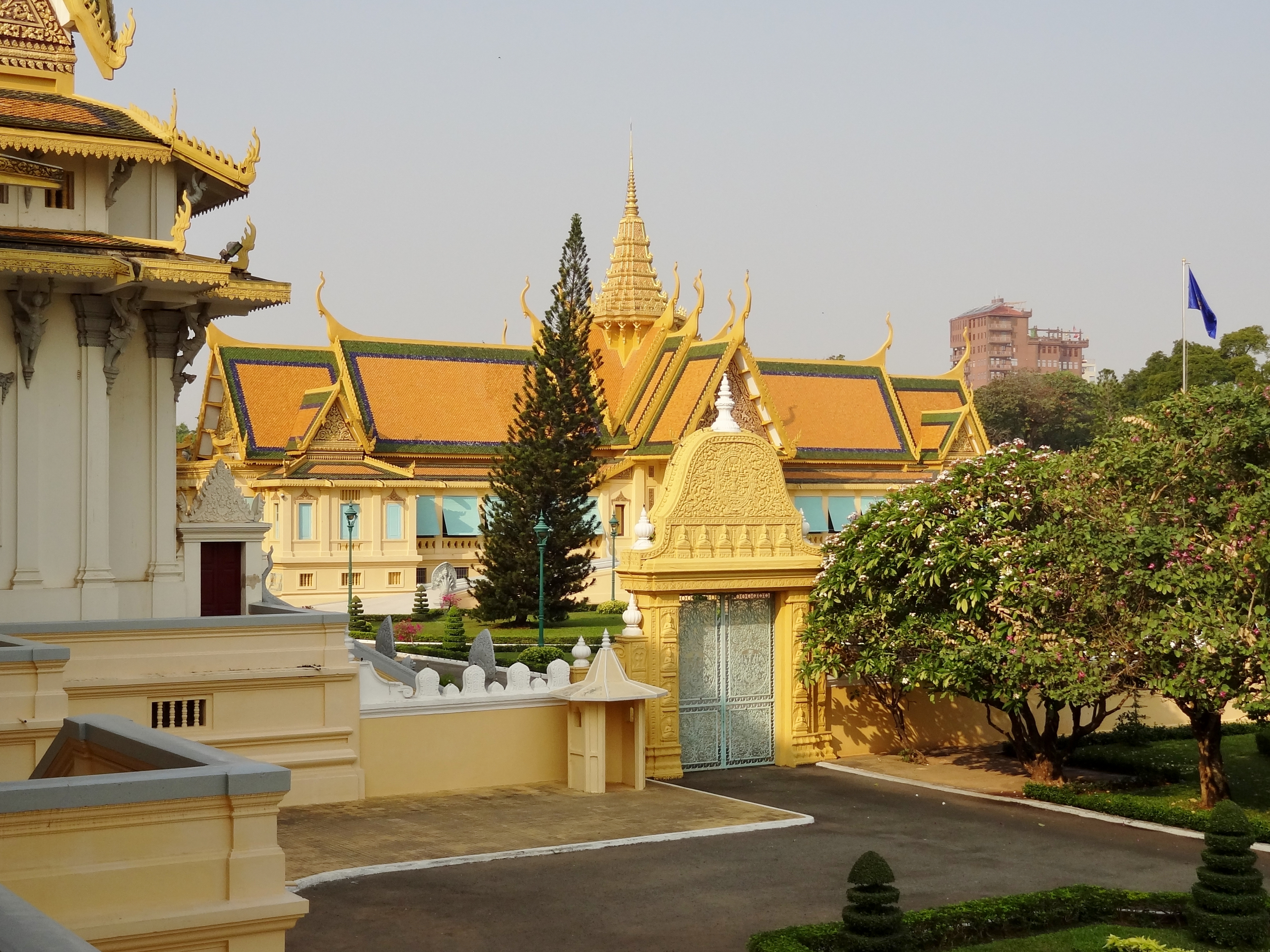
Khemarin Palace in Phnom Penh

- Royal Palace (King, official; the formal name of the building within the palace compound in which the King resides in is called Khemarin Palace)
- The Royal Residence (King, secondary)
- Peace Palace (Prime Minister, official workplace; the Prime Minister lives at his own private residence)

==== China ====
- Zhongnanhai (General Secretary, Communist Party and State Council)
- Jade Spring Hill (Villa area of the Central Military Commission)
- Beidaihe District (Communist Party's summer retreat place)
- Diaoyutai State Guesthouse (visiting dignitaries)

===== Former =====
Office and Residence

- Presidential Palace in Nanjing (1912, 1927–1937, 1946–1949; kept as museum from 1998)
- Qing army and the naval department in Beijing (1912–1928)
- Fortress Park and the Prince Chun Mansion of Zhongnanhai (1912–1928)
- Guangzhou Guanyinshan (now Yuexiu Shan) Yuexiu Building (1917–1922, the building destroyed in 1922, today this site for the Guangzhou Zhongshan Memorial Hall)
- Republic of China Lu Haijun Grand Marshal base camp was established in Guangzhou, was established in the original Guangdong Shi Min soil factory (1923–1925；now Sun Yat-sen Marshal House Memorial Hall)
- Wuhan Nanyang Building (1926–1927)
- Reorganized National Government of the Republic of China Headquarters in Nanjing (1940–1945)
- Residence of Wang Jingwei in Nanjing (1940–1945)
- Chongqing Nationalist Government Building (1937–1945)
- Huangshan official residence (1938–1945, Chiang Kai-shek's residence in Chongqing)
- Huangpu Road official residence (1929–1937, 1945–1949; also called Qi Ru, Chiang Kai-shek's residence in Nanjing)
- Shuangqing Villa in Beijing (former residence of Mao Zedong at 1949)

Residence

- Forbidden City (Emperor)
- Zhongnanhai in Beijing (Emperor, family)
- Old Summer Palace (Emperor, retreat)
- Mukden Palace (Emperor, summer residence)
- Chengde Mountain Resort (Emperor, summer residence)
- Summer Palace (Emperor, retreat)
- Imperial Palace of the Manchu State (Emperor of Manchukuo)
- Manchukuo General Affairs State Council building (Prime Minister of Manchukuo)
- Manchukuo Prime Minister's residence (residence of Zhang Jinghui)

===== Hong Kong =====
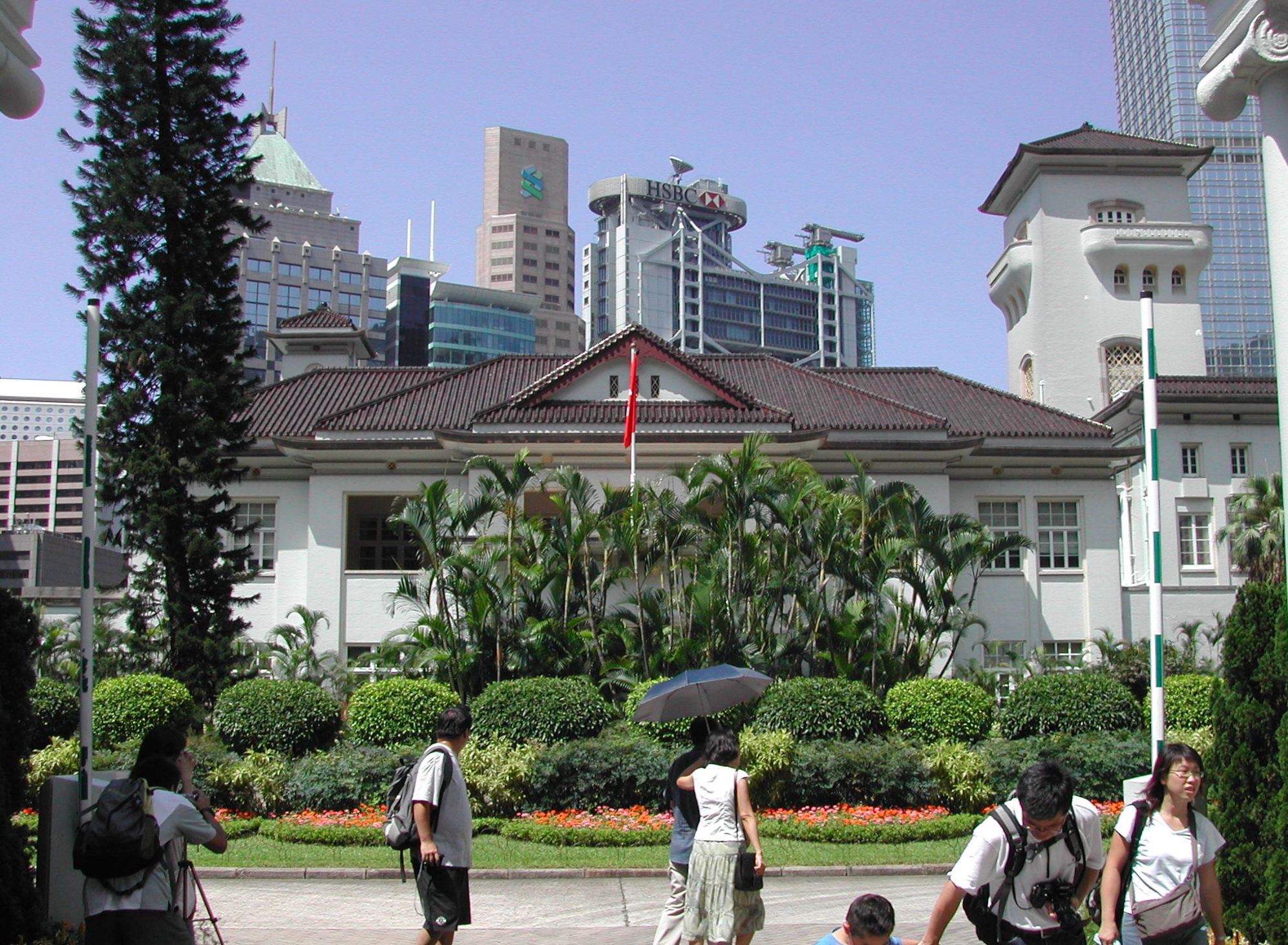
Government House, Hong Kong

- Government House (Chief Executive)
- Fanling Lodge (Chief Executive – Summer)
- Victoria House and Victoria Flats (15 Barker Road, The Peak) (Chief Secretary)
- Residence of the Financial Secretary (45 Shouson Hill Road, Deep Water Bay) (Financial Secretary)
- Residence of Secretary for Justice (19 Severn Road, The Peak) (Secretary for Justice)
- Chief Justice's House (19 Gough Hill Road, The Peak) (Chief Justice of the Court of Final Appeal) Also Known as Clavadel
- Headquarters House (11 Barker Road, The Peak) (Commanding Officer of PLA in Hong Kong)
- Grenville House (Residence for Tung Chee Hwa during his time as Chief Executive 1997–2006)

===== Macau =====
- Government House (Chief Executive)

===== Former Portuguese Macau =====
- Macau Government Headquarters was both the official residence and office for the Governor of Macau until 1999.

===== Former British Colony of Hong Kong =====
- Flagstaff House (commander of British forces in Hong Kong, formerly until 1978)
- Island House (formerly, District Officers (North), and later District Commissioners for the New Territories)
- Gate Lodge (Governor of Hong Kong's summer residence 1900–1934)
- Mountain Lodge (summer residence 1867–1897)
- Beaconsfield House

==== India ====
===== Union =====
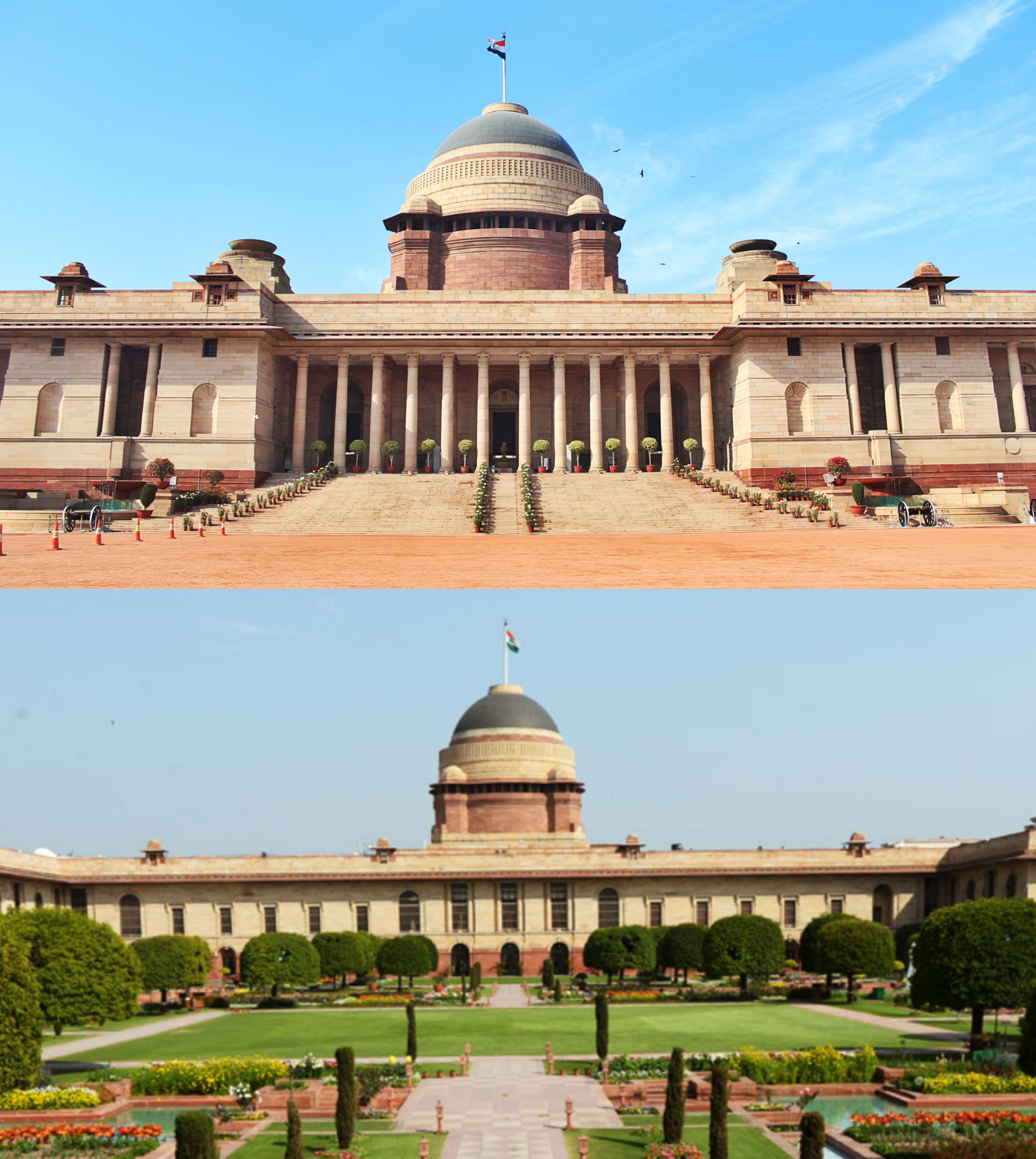
The Rashtrapati Bhavan, New Delhi

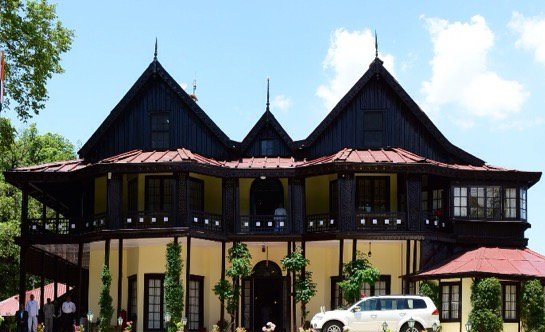
Rashtrapati Niwas, Shimla

- Rashtrapati Bhavan (President)
- Rashtrapati Niketan (Presidential retreat)
- Rashtrapati Nilayam (Presidential retreat)
- Rastrapati Niwas (Presidential retreat)
- Vice President's Enclave (Vice President)
- 7, Race Course Road (Prime Minister)
- Teen Murti Bhavan (Prime Minister 1947–1964 formerly)

===== State =====
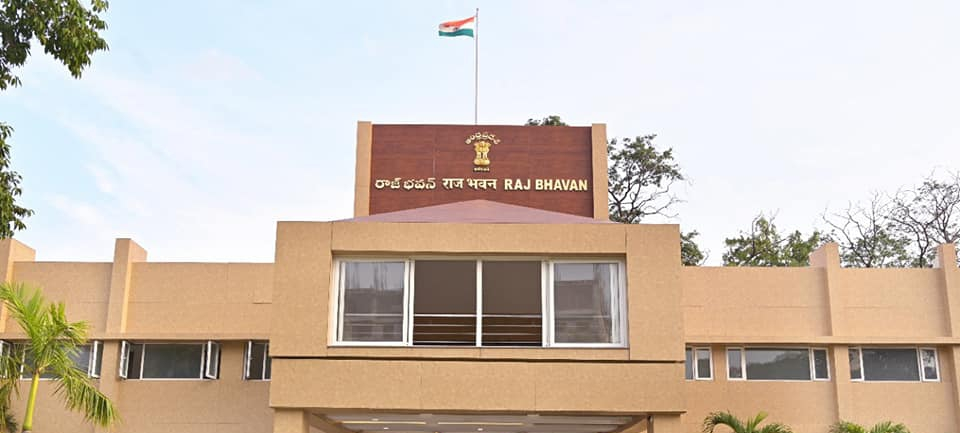
Lok Bhavan, Vijayawada

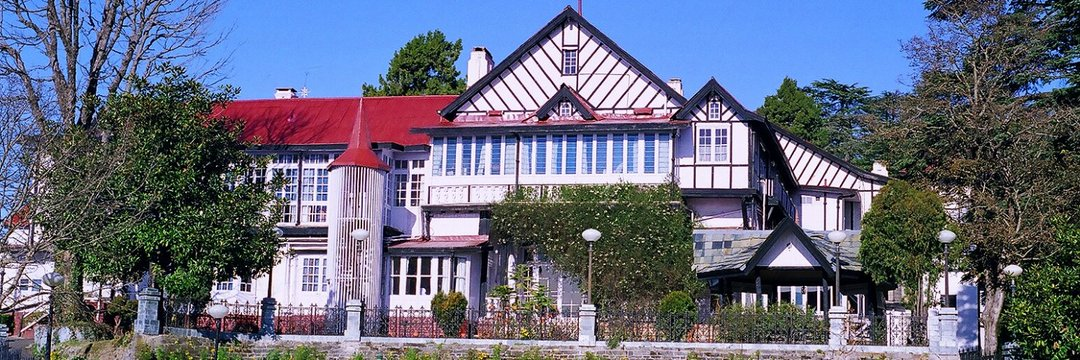
Lok Bhavan, Shimla

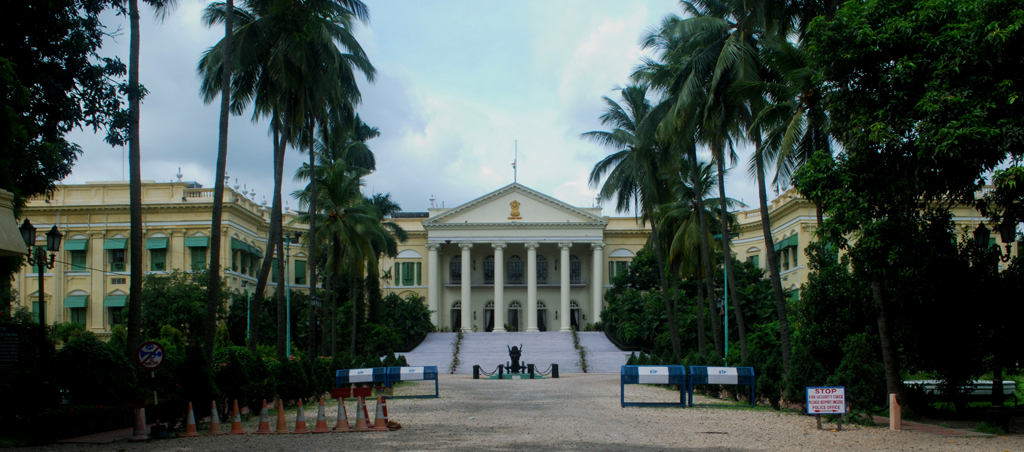
Lok Bhavan, Kolkata

- Andhra Pradesh:
- Lok Bhavan, Vijayawada (Governor)
- Arunachal Pradesh:
  Lok Bhavan, Itanagar (Governor)
- Assam:
  Lok Bhavan, Guwahati (Governor)
- Bihar:
  Lok Bhavan, Patna (Governor)
  1, Aney Marg (Chief Minister)
- Chhattisgarh:
  Lok Bhavan, Raipur (Governor)
- Goa:
  Lok Bhavan, Panaji (Governor)
- Gujarat:
  Lok Bhavan, Gandhinagar (Governor)
- Haryana:
  Lok Bhavan, Haryana (Governor)
- Himachal Pradesh:
  Lok Bhavan, Shimla (Governor)
  Oakover (Chief Minister)
- Jharkhand:
  Lok Bhavan, Ranchi (Governor)
- Karnataka:
  Lok Bhavan, Bangalore (Governor)
  Anugraha (Chief Minister)
- Kerala:
  Lok Bhavan, Thiruvananthapuram (Governor)
  Cliff House (Chief Minister)
- Madhya Pradesh:
  Lok Bhavan, Bhopal (Governor)
  Lok Bhavan, Pachmarhi (Governor, summer residence)
- Maharashtra:
  Lok Bhavan, Mumbai (Governor)
  Lok Bhavan, Nagpur (Governor, winter residence)
  Lok Bhavan, Pune (Governor, monsoon residence)
  Lok Bhavan, Mahabaleshwar (Governor, summer residence)
  Varsha Bungalow (Chief Minister)
- Manipur:
  Lok Bhavan, Imphal (Governor)
- Meghalaya:
  Lok Bhavan, Shillong (Governor)
- Mizoram:
  Lok Bhavan, Aizawl (Governor)
- Nagaland:
  Lok Bhavan, Kohima (Governor)
- Odisha:
  Lok Bhavan, Bhubaneswar (Governor)
  Raj Bhavan, Puri (Governor, summer residence)
- Punjab:
  Lok Bhavan, Punjab (Governor)
- Rajasthan:
  Lok Bhavan, Jaipur (Governor)
- Sikkim:
  Lok Bhavan, Gangtok (Governor)
- Tamil Nadu:
  Lok Bhavan, Chennai (Governor)
  Raj Bhavan, Ooty (Governor, summer residence)
- Telangana:
  Lok Bhavan, Hyderabad (Governor)
  Praja Bhavan (Chief Minister)
- Tripura:
  Lok Bhavan, Agartala (Governor)
- Uttar Pradesh:
  Lok Bhavan, Lucknow (Governor)
  5, Kalidas Marg (Chief Minister)
- Uttarakhand:
  Lok Bhavan, Dehradun (Governor)
  Lok Bhavan, Nainital (Governor, summer residence)
- West Bengal:
  Lok Bhavan, Kolkata (Governor)
  Lok Bhavan, Darjeeling (Governor, summer residence)

===== Union territories =====
- Andaman and Nicobar Islands:
  Lok Niwas, Port Blair (Lieutenant Governor)
- Delhi:
  Lok Niwas, Delhi (Lieutenant Governor)
- Jammu and Kashmir:
  Lok Bhavan, Jammu (Lieutenant Governor, winter residence)
  Lok Bhavan, Srinagar (Lieutenant Governor, summer residence)
- Ladakh:
  Lok Niwas, Leh (Lieutenant Governor)
- Puducherry:
  Lok Niwas, Pondicherry (Lieutenant Governor)

==== Indonesia ====
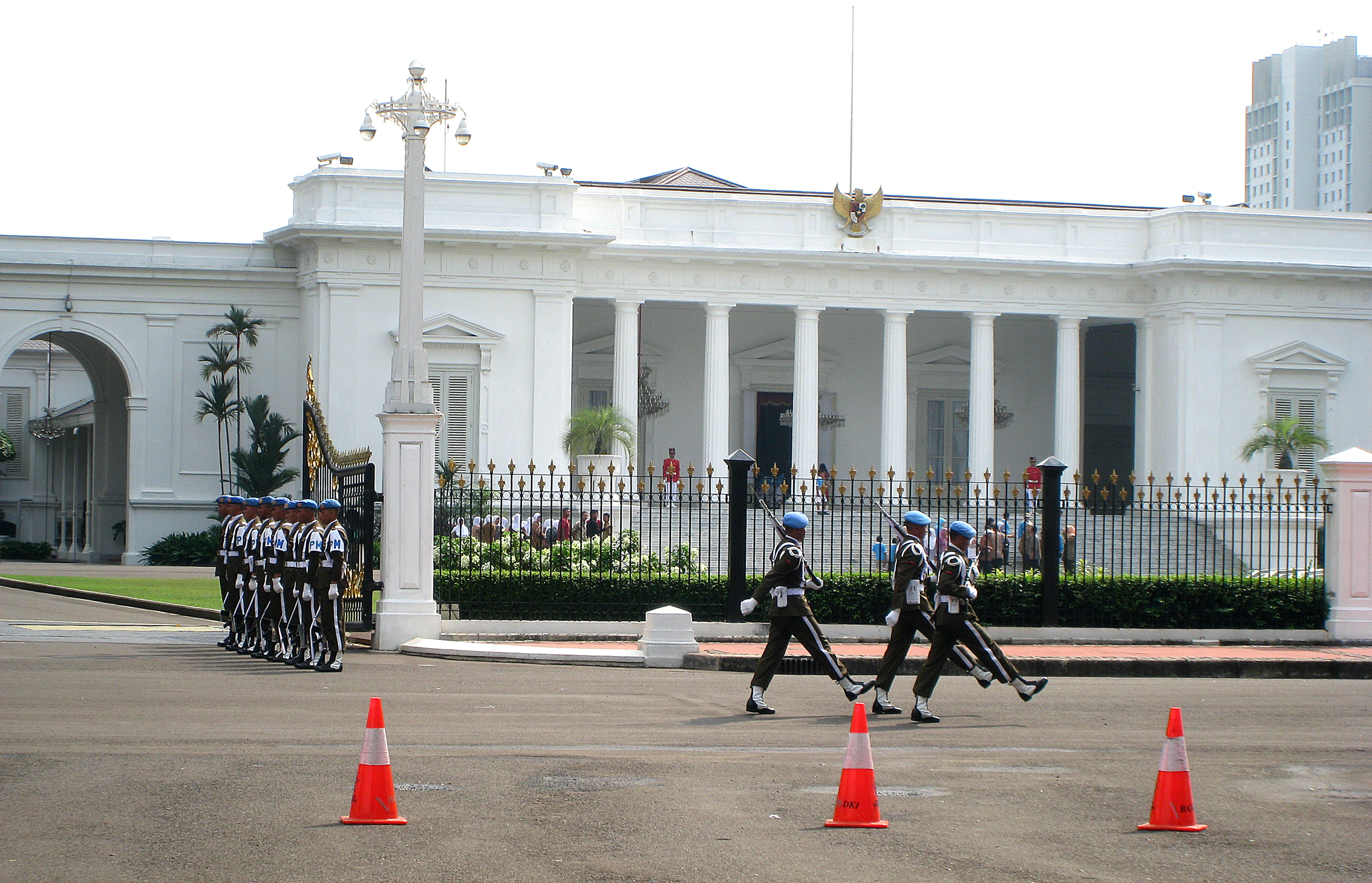
Istana Merdeka, Jakarta

- Istana Negara, Jakarta (President)
- Istana Merdeka, Jakarta (President)
- Istana Tampaksiring, Bali (President)
- Garuda Palace, Nusantara (President)
- Gedung Agung, Yogyakarta (President)
- Istana Bogor, Bogor, West Java (President, retreat)
- Istana Cipanas, Cipanas, West Java (President, retreat)
- Vice Presidential Palace, Jakarta (Vice President)
- Rumah Dinas Ketua MPR RI Widya Chandra Complex (Speaker Of MPR RI)
- Rumah Dinas Wakil Ketua MPR RI Widya Chandra Complex (Vice Speaker Of MPR RI)
- Rumah Dinas Ketua DPR RI Widya Chandra Complex (Speaker Of DPR RI)
- Rumah Dinas Ketua DPR RI Widya Chandra Complex (Vice Speaker Of DPR RI)
- Rumah Dinas Ketua DPD RI Widya Chandra Complex (Speaker Of DPD RI)
- Rumah Dinas Wakil Ketua DPD RI Widya Chandra Complex (Vice Speaker Of DPD RI)
- Kompleks Kediaman Pimpinan MPR/DPR/DPD Plaza Legislatif IKN Nusantara (Parliamentary Leadership)
- Rumah Jabatan Anggota (DPR RI but not used anymore and replace by Housing Allowance DPR RI)
- Kompleks Rumah Dinas Kabinet Indonesia Wdiya Chandra (Cabinet Of Indonesia)
- Rumah Dinas Hakim Agung & MK Kompleks Yudikatif (Judicial Of Indonesia)
- Kompleks Yudikatif IKN Nusantara (Judicial Of Indonesia)
- Kompleks Rumah Dinas Anggota MPR/DPR/DPD Plaza Legislatif (Member Of Parliament Of Indonesia)

==== Iran ====
- Office of the Supreme Leader of Iran (Supreme Leader)
- Sa'dabad Complex (President)

===== Former =====
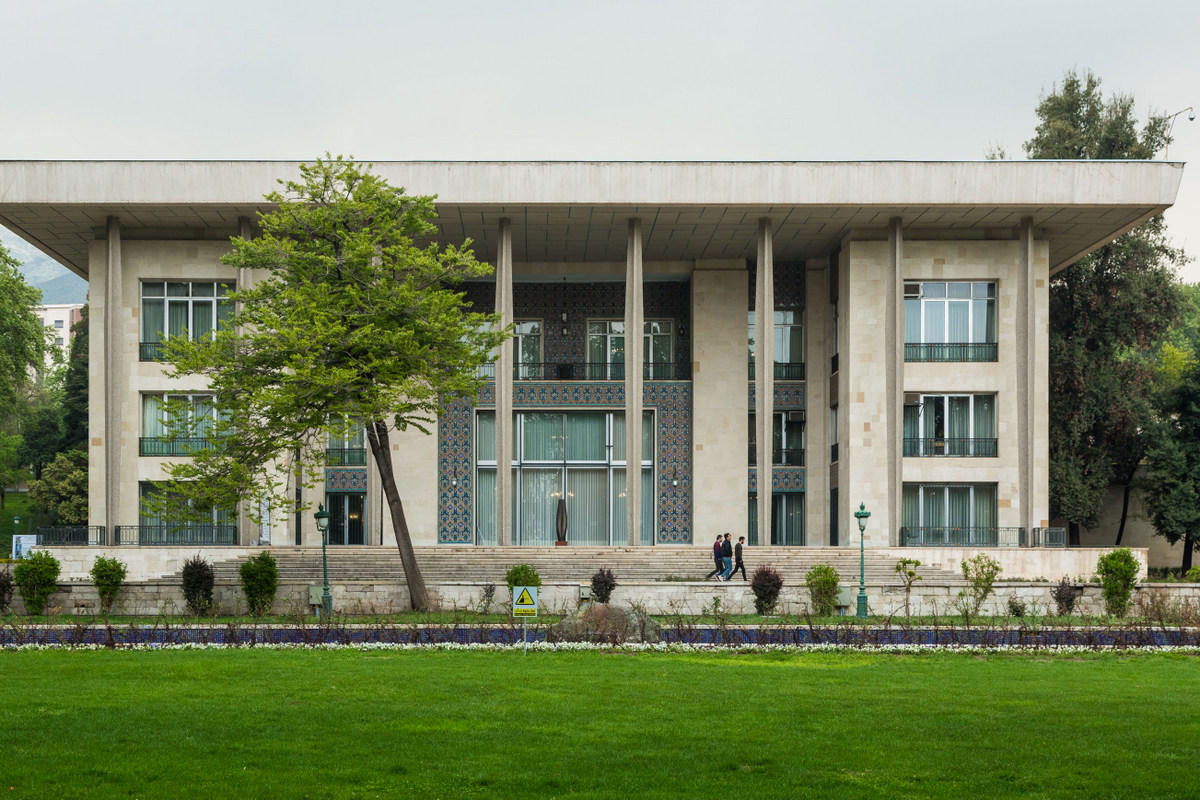
Niavaran Palace, official residence of the last Shah of Iran from 1967 to 1979

- Ali Qapu (Safavid dynasty, formerly; kept as museum)
- Golestan Palace (Qajar dynasty, formerly; kept as museum)
- Marble Palace (Pahlavi dynasty, kept as museum)
- Niavaran Complex (Qajar and Pahlavi dynasties, formerly; kept as museum)
- Ramsar Palace (Pahlavi dynasty, kept as museum)
- Sa'dabad Complex (Pahlavi dynasty, formerly; Some buildings are kept as museum and some are still used by the government)
- Jamaran Hussainiya (Supreme Leader Ruhollah Khomeini, kept as museum)

==== Iraq ====
- Radwaniyah Palace: (President)
- Republican Palace: (Prime Minister)
- Al Zaqura Building: (Prime Minister)

==== Israel ====
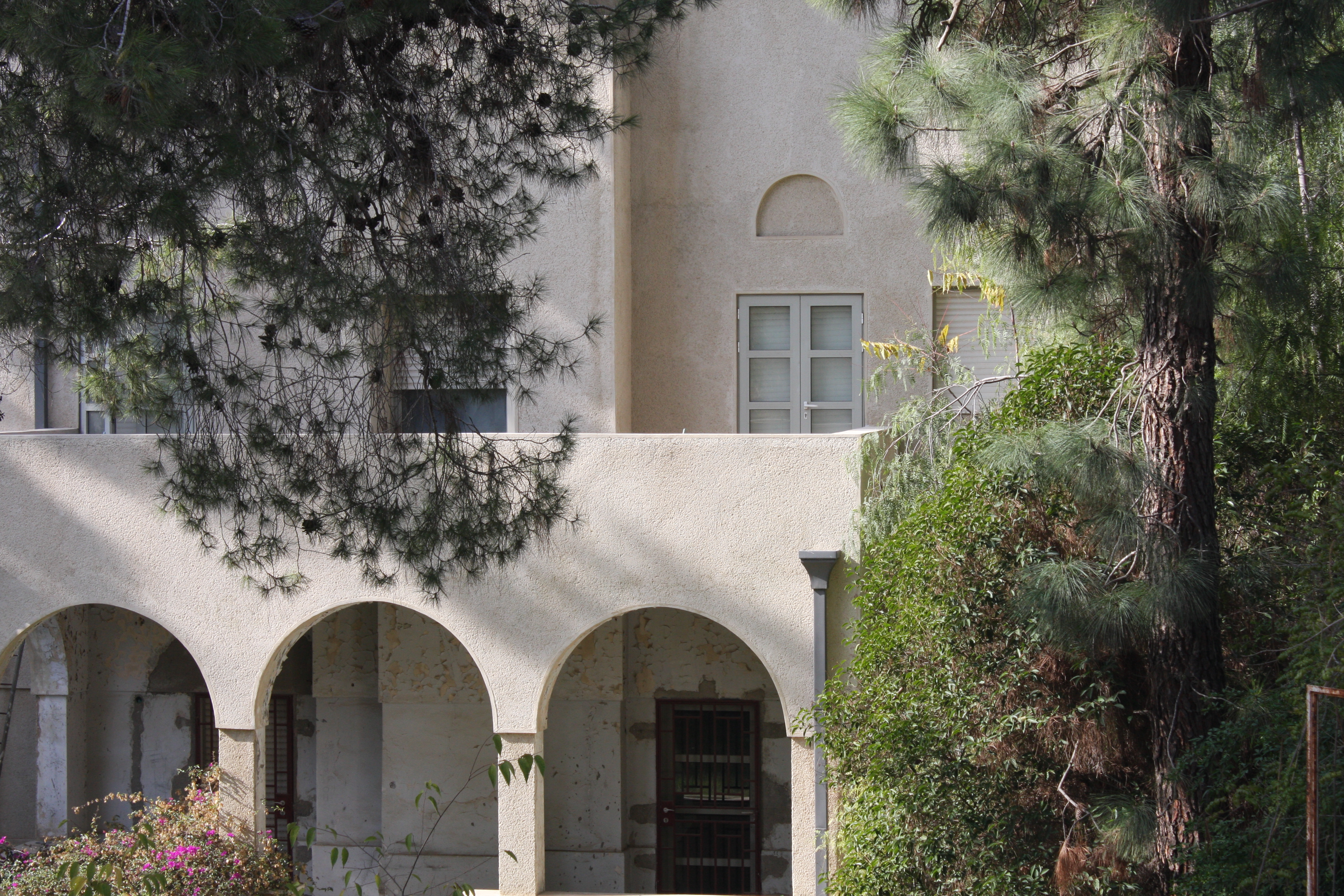
Beit Aghion, Jerusalem.

- Beit HaNassi ("President's House") (President)
- Beit Aghion ("Aghion House") (Prime Minister)
- King David Hotel (visiting dignitaries)

==== Japan ====
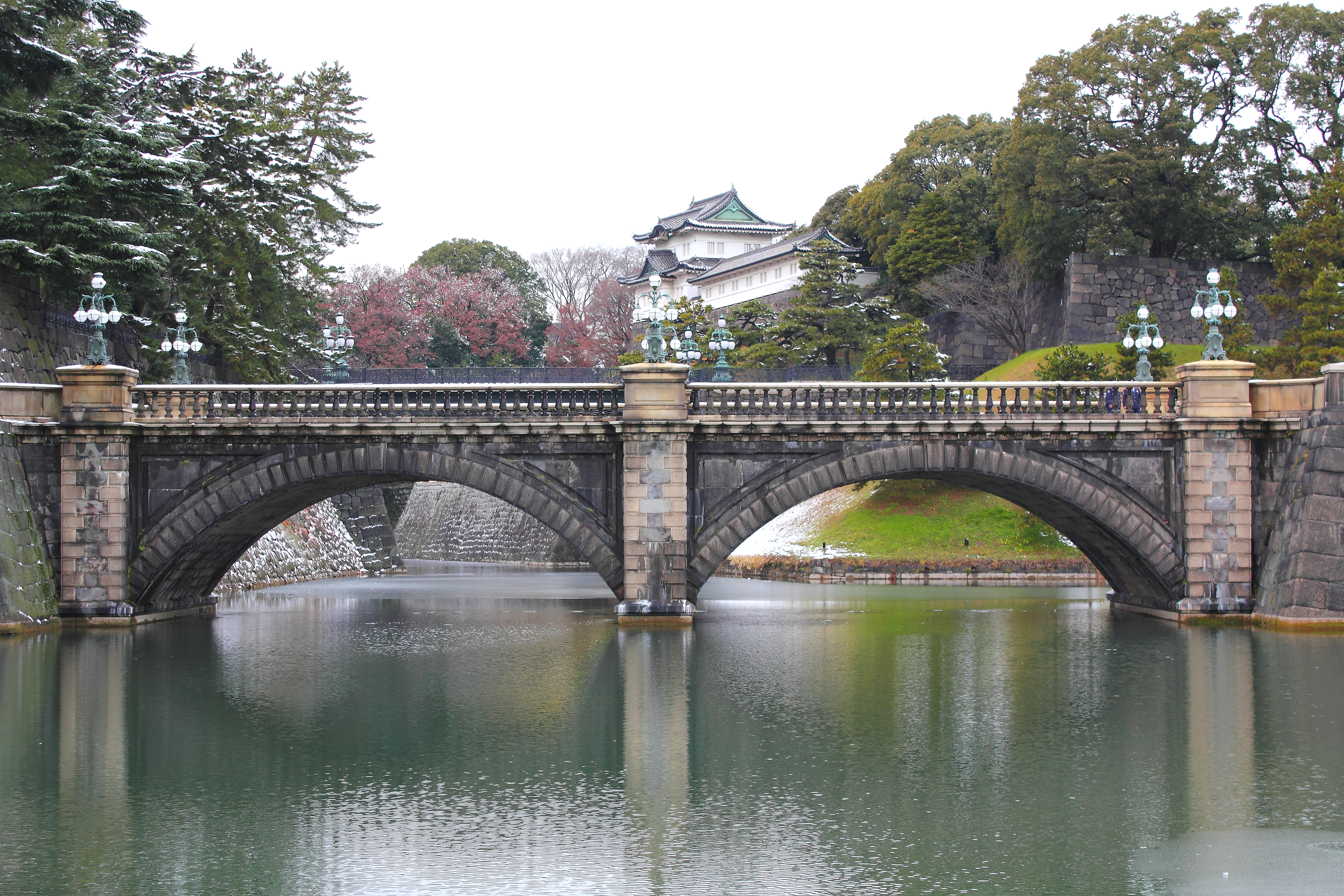
The Tokyo Imperial Palace, the official residence of the emperor of Japan.

- Tokyo Imperial Palace, Official Residence of the (Emperor of Japan)
- Naikaku Sōri Daijin Kōtei, Official Residence of the (Prime Minister of Japan)

===== Former =====
- Kyoto Imperial Palace, also known as Kyōto Imperial Palace (Emperor, until 1869; kept as museum)

==== Jordan ====
- Raghadan Palace (King)
- Al Hummar Palace (used for state receptions)
- Basman Palace (King)
- Al Qasr al Sagheer (King)

==== Kazakhstan ====
Ak Orda Presidential Palace

- Ak Orda Presidential Palace (President)

==== Kuwait ====
- Seif Palace (also known as the Amiri Diwan or Emir's Palace) (Emir)
- Bayan Palace (Emir)
- Dar Salwa (Emir)

===== Former =====
- Dasman Palace (Emir, formerly)

==== Kyrgyzstan ====
- White House, also Government House or Presidential Palace
- Ala Archa State Residence (President, Prime Minister, Former Presidents)

==== Laos ====
- Presidential Palace (General Secretary and President)

===== Former =====
- Royal Palace, Luang Prabang (also known as Haw Kham, former residence of the King of Laos)

==== Lebanon ====
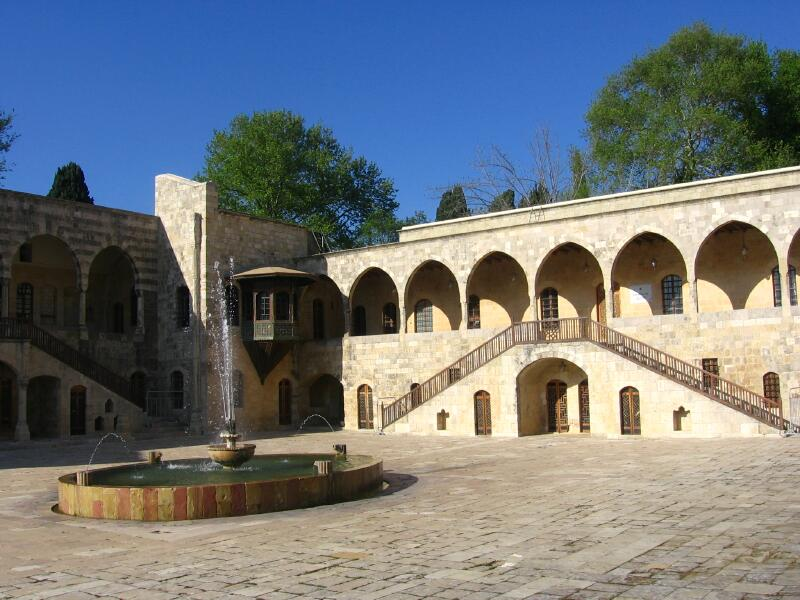
Beiteddine Palace

- Baabda Palace (President)
- Beiteddine Palace (President, summer retreat)
- Grand Serail (Prime Minister)
- Ain Al Tine Palace (Parliament Speaker)

===== Former =====
- Beiteddine Palace (Prince, formerly; kept as a museum)

==== Malaysia ====
===== Federal =====
- Istana Negara, Kuala Lumpur (King)
- Istana Melawati. Putrajaya, (King, retreat)
- Seri Perdana, Putrajaya (Prime Minister)
- Seri Satria, Putrajaya (Deputy Prime Minister)

===== State =====
- Perlis
  Istana Arau (Raja)
  Chief Minister's Official Residence (Chief Minister)
- Kedah
  Istana Anak Bukit (Sultan)
  Seri Mentaloon (Chief Minister)
- Penang
  Seri Mutiara (Governor)
  Seri Teratai (Chief Minister)
- Perak
  Istana Iskandariah (Sultan, largely ceremonial)
  Istana Kinta (Sultan)
  Chief Minister's Official Residence (Chief Minister)
- Selangor
  Istana Alam Shah (Sultan, largely ceremonial)
  Istana Bukit Kayangan (Sultan)
  Chief Minister's Official Residence (Chief Minister)
- Negeri Sembilan
  Istana Besar Seri Menanti (Yang di-Pertuan Besar)
  Chief Minister's Official Residence (Chief Minister)
- Malacca
  Istana Melaka (Governor)
  Seri Bendahara (Chief Minister)
- Johor
  Istana Besar (Sultan, largely ceremonial)
  Istana Bukit Serene (Sultan)
  Saujana (Chief Minister)
- Pahang
  Istana Abu Bakar (Sultan)
  Chief Minister's Official Residence (Chief Minister)
- Terengganu
  Istana Syarqiyyah (Sultan)
  Seri Iman (Chief Minister)
- Kelantan
  Istana Balai Besar (Sultan, largely ceremonial)
  Istana Negeri (Sultan)
  JKR 10 (Chief Minister)
- Sabah
  Istana Seri Kinabalu (Governor)
  Seri Gaya (Chief Minister)
- Sarawak
  The Astana (Governor)
  Satria Pertiwi Complex (Premier)

===== Former =====
- Former Istana Negara at Jalan Istana (King, former official residence)
- Penang
  Suffolk House (Former Governor's residence)
- Malacca
  Old Governor's residence (Former Governor and Yang di-Pertua Negeri's residence)

==== Maldives ====
- Muliaage (President)
- Hilaaleege Official residence (Vice President)

===== Former =====
- Theemuge (President, formerly; now the Supreme Court of the Maldives)

==== Mongolia ====
- Government Palace (Offices of the President and Prime Minister)
- The Marshal Mansion (President, former winter residence of Khorloogiin Choibalsan and Yumjaagiin Tsedenbal)
- Ikh Tenger Complex (President's residence)

==== Myanmar ====
- Presidential Palace (President)
- Zeyadili Palace (Tatmadaw Headquarters)

===== Former =====
- Government House (Governor)
- Belmond Governor's Residence (Governor)
- Zayar Thiri Baikman in Yangon (Tatmadaw Headquarters)

==== Nepal ====
- Sheetal Niwas (President)
- Baluwatar (Prime Minister)

==== North Korea ====
- Government Complex No. 1 (39°0'56"N 125°44'43"E)
- Ryongsong Residence (General Secretary of the Workers' Party of Korea, Supreme Leader)
- Kangdong Residence
- Sinuiju North Korean Leader's Residence
- Paekhwawon State Guest House

===== Former =====
- Kumsusan Palace of the Sun (President, formerly; kept as mausoleum)

==== Oman ====
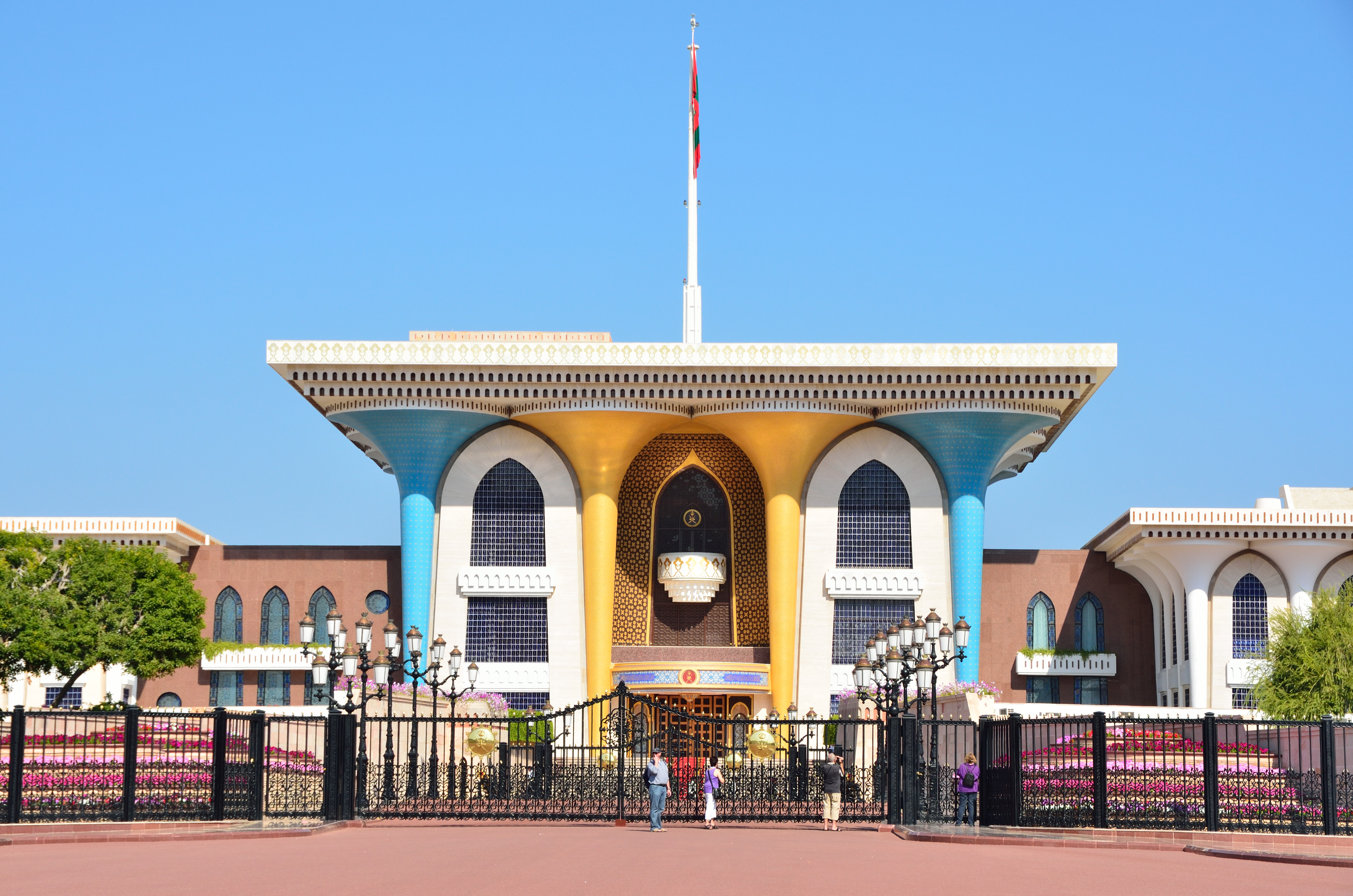
Al Alam Palace

- Al Alam Palace
- Al Baraka Palace
- Al Maamoura Palace
- Al Shomoukh Palace

==== Pakistan ====
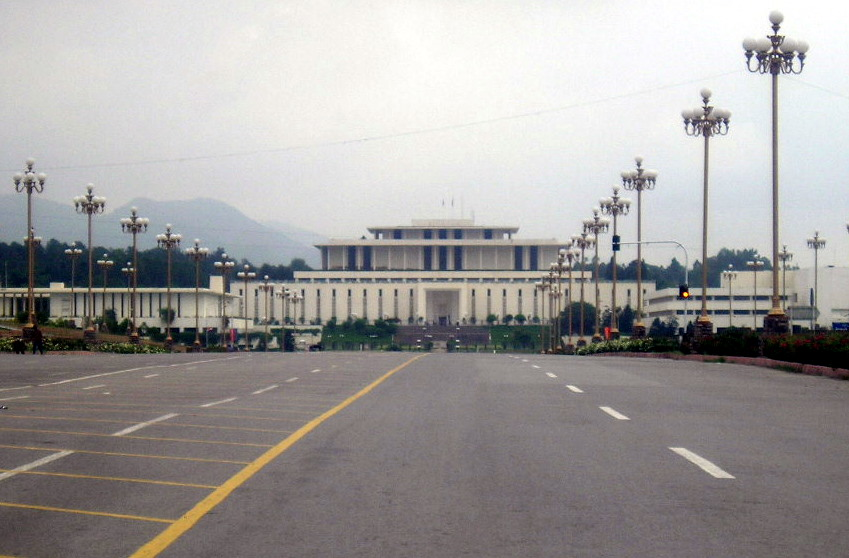
Aiwan-e-Sadr

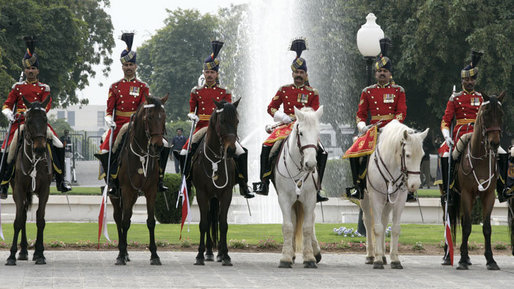
Pakistan cavalry honor guard, Aiwan-e-Sadr

===== Federal =====
- Aiwan-e-Sadr (President)
- Prime Minister House (Prime Minister)

===== Provincial =====
- Balochistan:
  Governor's House
- Khyber Pakhtunkhwa:
  Governor's House
- Punjab:
  Governor's House
- Sindh:
  Governor's House

==== Palestine ====
- Mukataa (PLO)

==== Philippines ====
Malacañang Palace as viewed from the Pasig River

- Malacañang Palace, Manila (President)
- Malacañang of the South, Davao City (President, official residence in Mindanao)
- Mansion House, Baguio (President, official summer residence)

===== Former =====
- Independence House, Aguinaldo Shrine, Kawit, Cavite (de facto official residence of the First Philippine Republic and Republic of Biak-na-Bato)
- Palacio del Gobernador, Intramuros, Manila (residence of the Governor-General of the Philippines)
- Malolos Cathedral, Malolos, Bulacan (official residence of the First Philippine Republic)
- Malacañang ti Amianan, Paoay, Ilocos Norte (former residence of the late Ferdinand Marcos; now a memorial museum)
- Malacañang sa Sugbo, Cebu City (President, official residence in Visayas)
- Leyte Provincial Capitol, seat of the Commonwealth of the Philippines

==== Qatar ====
- Emir's Palace (Emir)
- Al Wajba Palace (Emir)

==== Saudi Arabia ====
- Al Yamamah Palace, Riyadh (King)
- Al Salam Palace, Jeddah (King)
- Al Safa Palace, Mecca (King)

==== Singapore ====
- Istana (President; de jure)
- Sri Temasek (Prime Minister)

==== South Korea ====
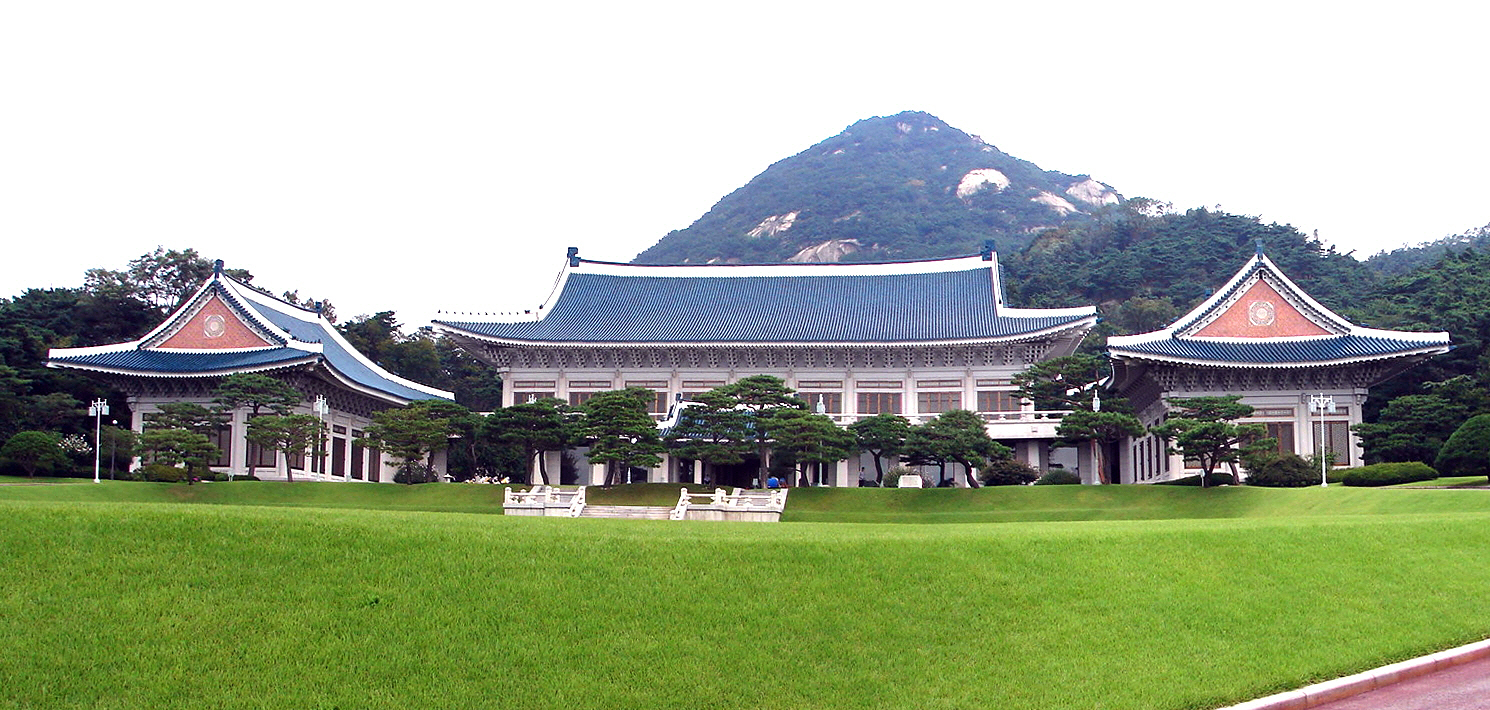
Cheong Wa Dae, Seoul

- Cheong Wa Dae ("House with Blue Rooftiles") (President)

– Cheong Wa Dae is the official presidential office and residence complex for the President of South Korea.
– It is located next to Gyeongbokgung, the main palace during the Joseon dynasty.

- Cheong Nam Dae ("Cheong Wa Dae in the South") (President; no longer used)

– Cheong Nam Dae used to be one of the two vacation residences for the President of Republic of Korea. It was returned to public in 2003.
– It is located in Cheongwon-gun, North Chungcheong Province.

- Cheong Hae Dae ("Cheong Wa Dae on the Seashore") (President; no longer used)

– Cheong Hae Dae used to be one of the two vacation residences for the President of Republic of Korea. Although the president no longer uses this facility this compound is still under the administration of the Republic of Korea Navy, and thus is not open to public access.
– It is located on one of the islands of Geoje-shi, South Gyeongsang Province.

- Gukhoeuijang Gonggwan ("Official Residence of the Speaker of National Assembly") (Speaker of National Assembly)

– This is the official residence for the Speaker of the National Assembly of Republic of Korea. The Speaker, also, does not work here.
– It is located in Hannam-dong, Yongsan-gu, Seoul, where many foreign missions to Korea are located.

- Daebeobwonjang Gonggwan ("Official Residence of the Chief Justice of the Supreme Court") (Chief Justice of the Supreme Court of Korea)

– This is the official residence for the Chief Justice of the Supreme Court of Korea. The Chief Justice, also, does not work here.
– It is also located in Hannam-dong, Yongsan-gu, Seoul.

- Heonbeopjaepansojang Gonggwan ("Official Residence of the President of the Constitutional Court") (President of the Constitutional Court of Korea)

– This is the official residence for the President of the Constitutional Court of Korea. The President of the Court, also, does not work here.
– It is located close to Cheong Wa Dae.

- Chongri Gonggwan ("Official Residence of the Prime Minister") (Prime Minister)

– This is the official residence for the Prime Minister of Republic of Korea. The Prime Minister, however, does not work here.
– It is located close to Cheong Wa Dae.

- Most ministers of state and heads of administrative regions also have official residences, although they are not listed here.

==== Sri Lanka ====
- President's House (Official residence in Colombo of the President)
- President's Pavilion (Official residence in Kandy of the President)
- Queen's Cottage (Country retreat of the President)
- Temple Trees (Official residence of the Prime Minister)
- Prime Minister's Cottage (country retreat of the prime minister)
- Speaker's Residence (official residence of the speaker of the Parliament)
- Chief Justice's House, Colombo (official residence of the chief justice)
- Visumpaya (Residence of a cabinet minister nominated by the president)
- General's House (country retreat for Members of Parliament)
- Bank House, Colombo (official residence of the governor of the Central Bank of Sri Lanka)
- General's House, Colombo (official residence of the commander of the Sri Lanka Army)

==== Syria ====
- Presidential Palace on Mount Mezzeh, Damascus

===== Former =====
- Mustapha Pasha al-Abed's Palace (President)
- Nazim Pashas's Palace (President)
- Tishreen Residence, Ar Rabwah, Damascus
- Al-Rawda Residence, Damascus
- Al-Muhajirin Residence, Damascus
- Bashar al-Assad's summer house, built for security and rapid exits on the banks of the Mediterranean Sea

==== Taiwan ====
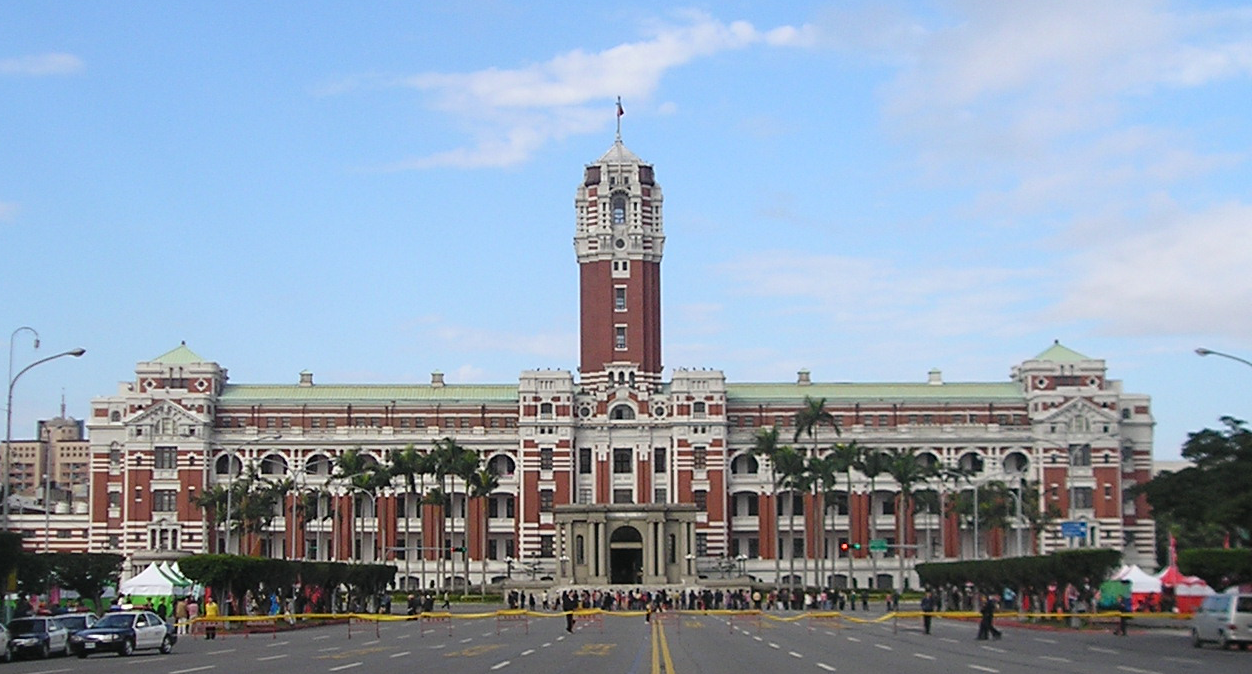
Presidential Building, Taipei

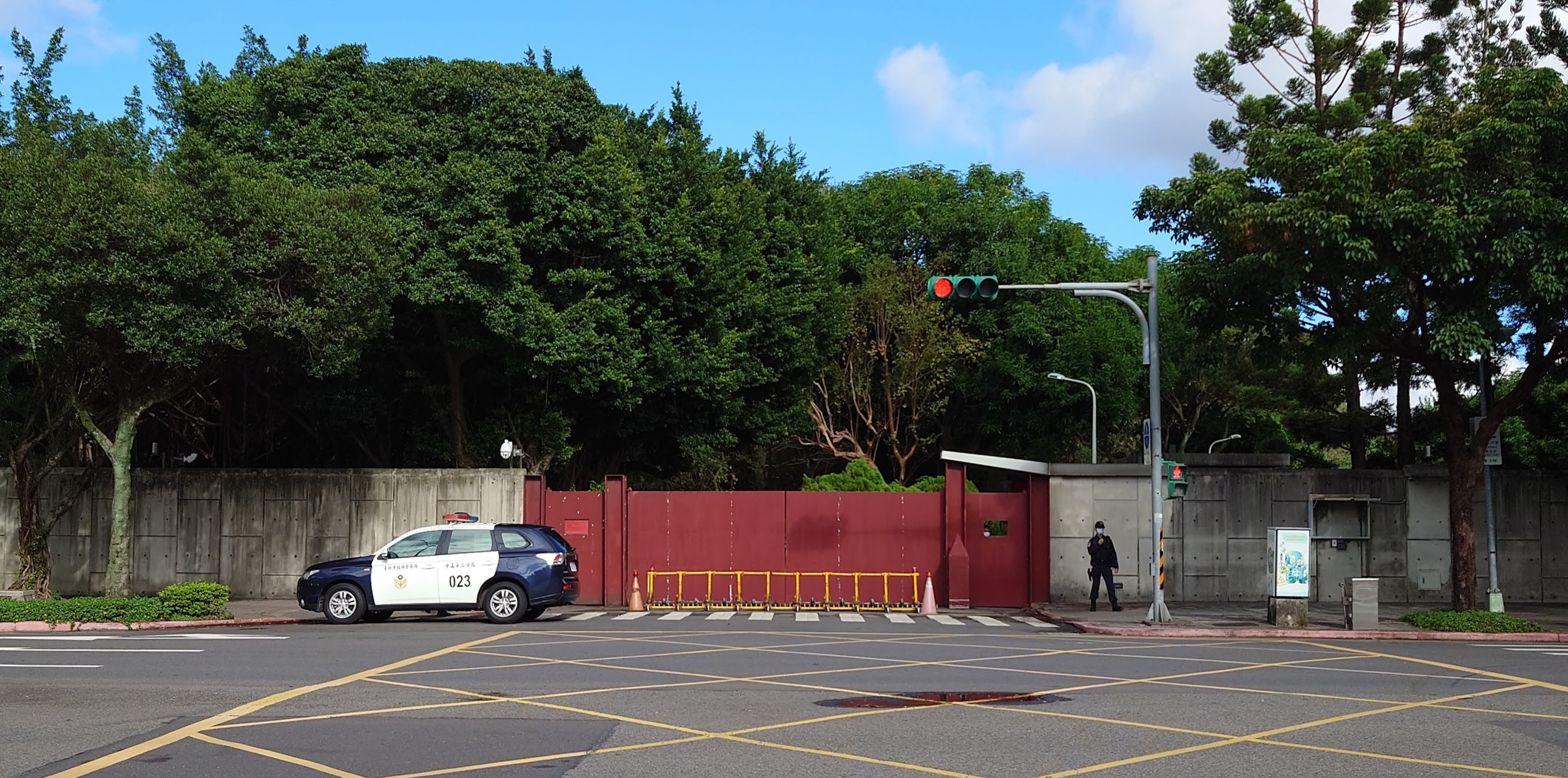
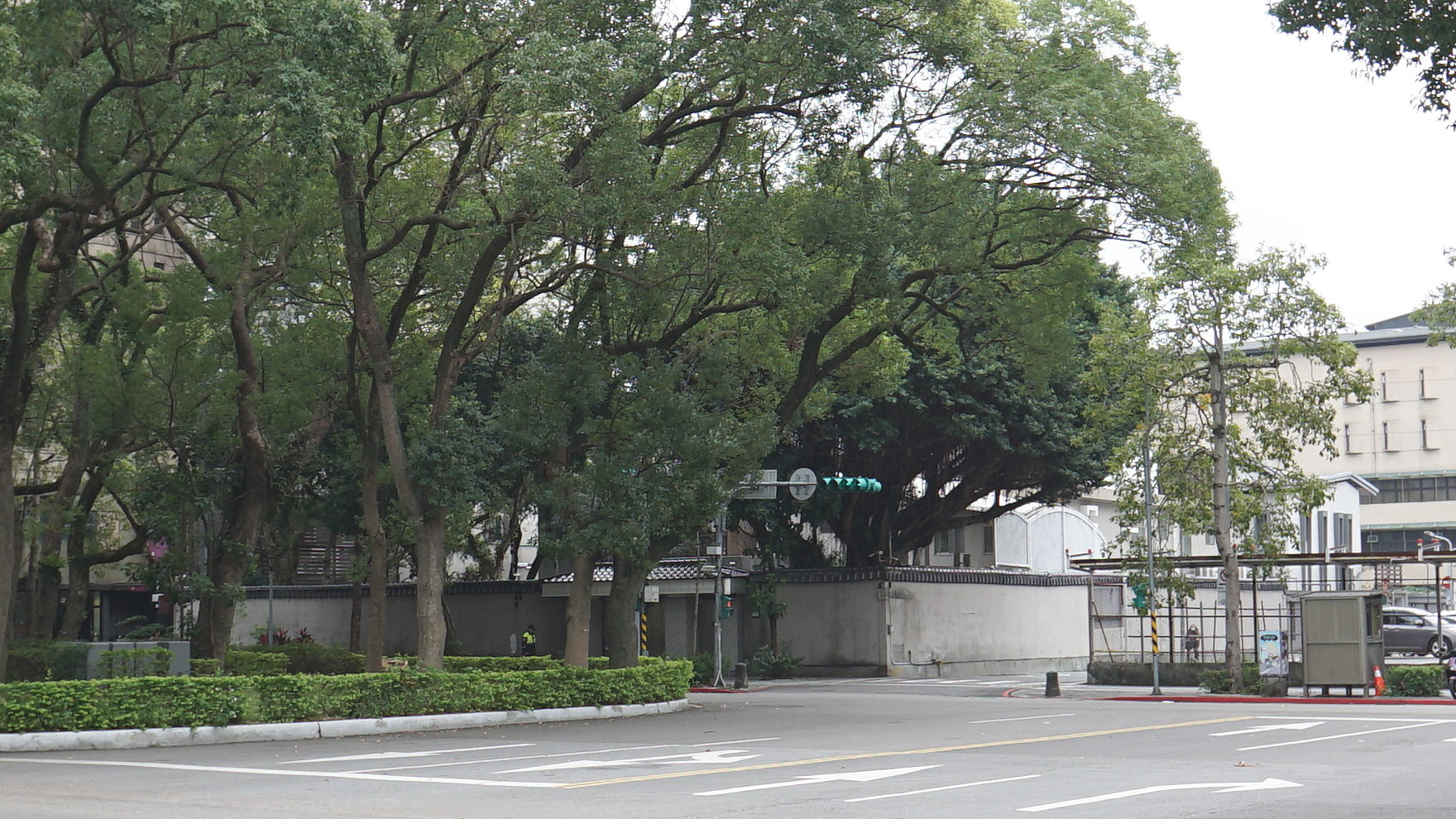
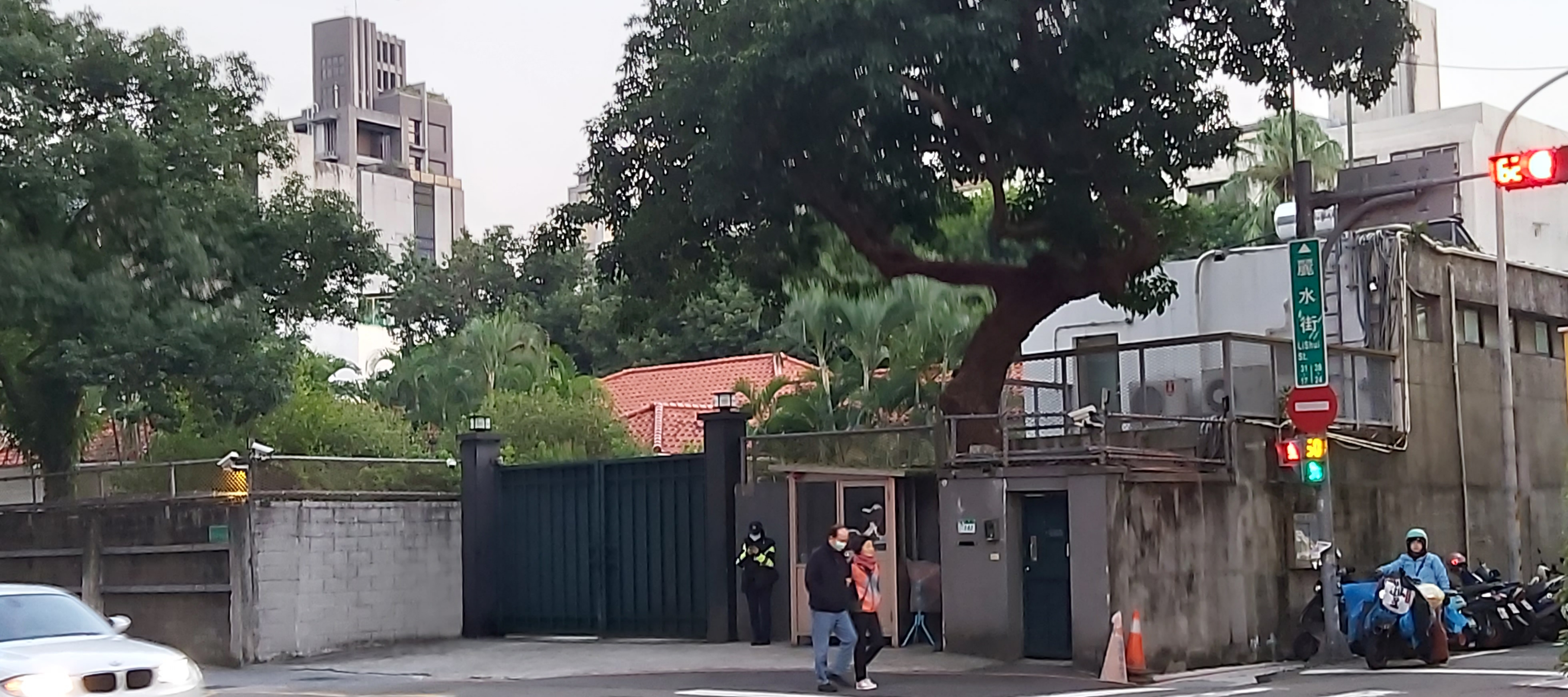
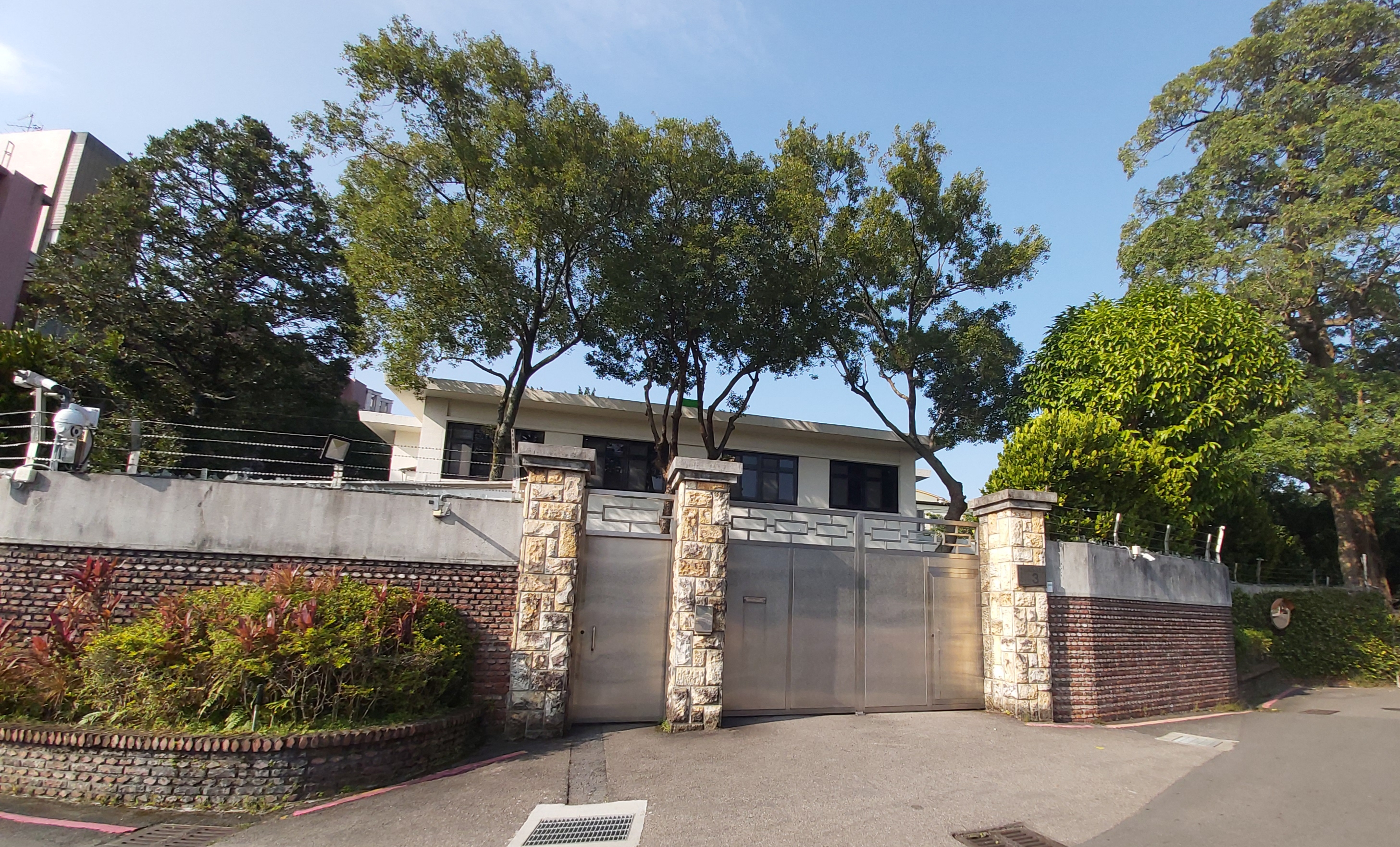
Official residences of the President, Vice President, Premier and President of the Legislative Yuan of Republic of China are located in Taipei, Taiwan.

Workplace

- Presidential Office Building (formerly office of Governor-General of Taiwan)

Residence

- Official Residence of the President, currently code-named "Wanli Residence"
- Shilin Official Residence (Former residence of Chiang Kai-shek)
- Guesthouses of Chiang Kai-shek
- Seven Seas Residence(Former residence of Chiang Ching-kuo)

Guest House

- Taipei Guest House
- Grand Hotel (Taipei)

==== Tajikistan ====
- Kohi Millat

==== Timor-Leste ====
- Nicolau Lobato Presidential Palace (President)

==== Thailand ====
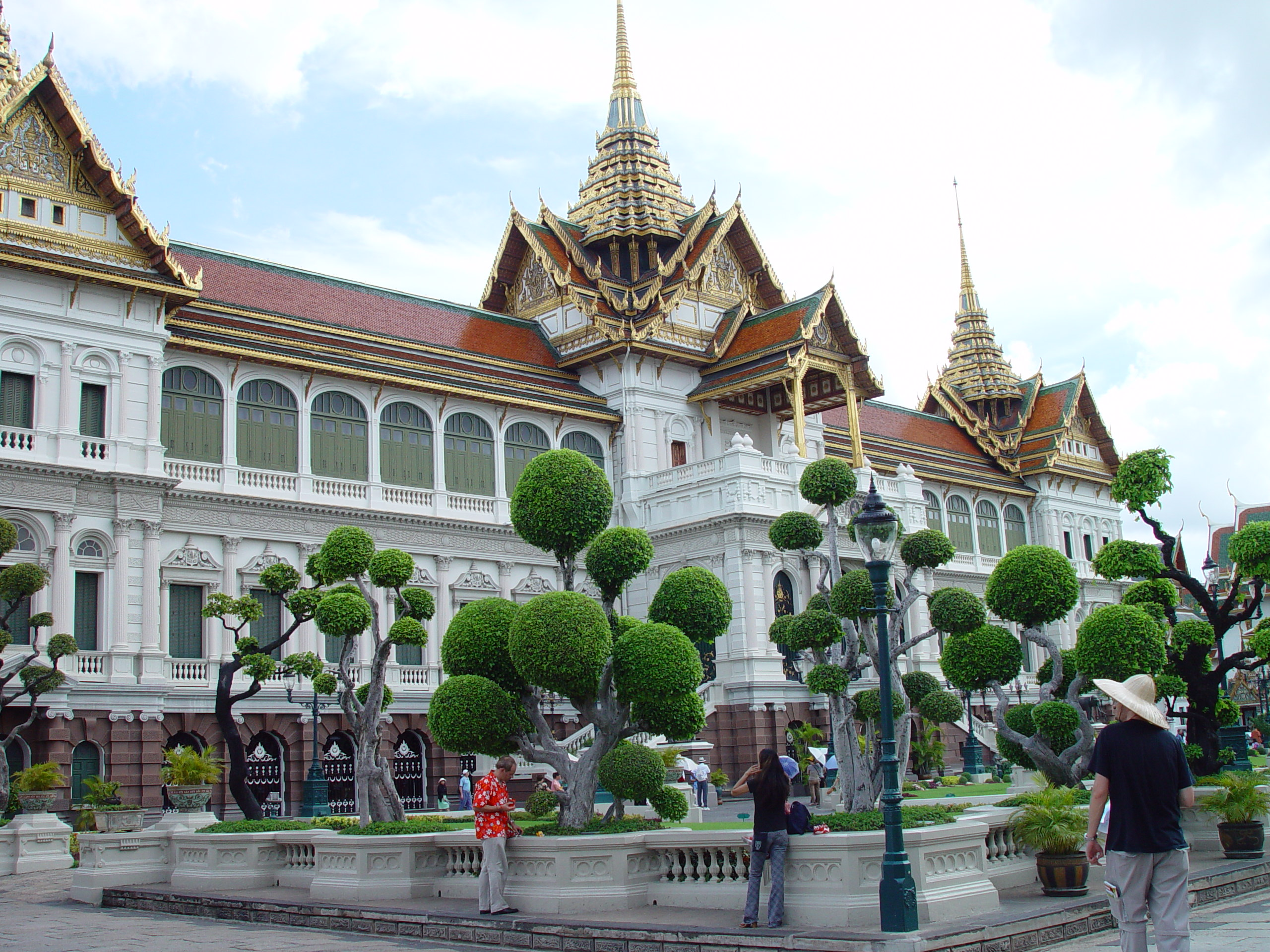
Grand Palace, Bangkok

- Grand Palace (Monarch, official and ceremonial but not residential)
- Dusit Palace (Monarch; parts of it now houses several museums)
  - Amphorn Sathan Residential Hall (Monarch, primary residential home of King Vajiralongkorn)
- Bang Pa-In Royal Palace (Monarch, summer retreat, now generally open to the public)
- Klai Kangwon Villa (Monarch, seaside retreat)
- Bhubing Palace (Monarch, northern residence)
- Thaksin Ratchaniwet Palace (Monarch, southern residence)
- Phu Phan Palace (Monarch, northeastern residence)
- Sa Pathum Palace (Princess Royal)
- Sukhothai Palace (Princess Sirivannavari)
- Chakri Bongkot Palace (Princess Srisavangavadhana)
- Thewet Palace (Princess Suddhanarinatha)
- Phitsanulok Mansion (Prime Minister)

===== Former =====
- Royal Palace of Sukhothai (Monarch of Sukhothai, now part of Sukhothai Historical Park)
- Chan Palace (Monarch from Sukhothai to Ayutthaya and Viceroy of Ayutthaya, now a historic site)
- Royal Palace of Ayutthaya (Monarch of Ayutthaya, now part of Ayutthaya Historical Park)
- Chandrakasem Palace (Viceroy of Ayutthaya, now the National Museum)
- Suan Luang Palace (Deputy Viceroy of Ayutthaya, now part of Ayutthaya Historical Park)
- King Narai's Palace (Residence of King Narai, now the National Museum)
- Thonburi Palace (Monarch of Thonburi, now the Royal Thai Navy Headquarters)
- Front Palace (Viceroy, now the National Museum)
- Rear Palace (Deputy Viceroy, now Siriraj Hospital)
- Phra Nakhon Khiri Palace (Monarch, summer retreat, now the Historical Park)
- Saranrom Palace (Accommodation of state foreign guests)
- Phra Chuthathut Palace (Summer retreat of King Chulalongkorn, now area of Chulalongkorn University)
- Sanam Chan Palace (Residence of King Vajiravudh, now a museum)
- Phaya Thai Palace (Residence of King Vajiravudh, now a museum)
- Mrigadayavan Palace (Summer retreat of King Vajiravudh)
- Istana Kota Nilam (Monarch of Patani)
- Wiang Keaw Palace (Monarch from Lan Na to Chiang Mai)
- Royal Palace of Phrae (Monarch of Phrae)
- Chitralada Royal Villa (Residence of King Bhumibol Adulyadej and Queen Sirikit)

==== Turkey ====
===== State =====
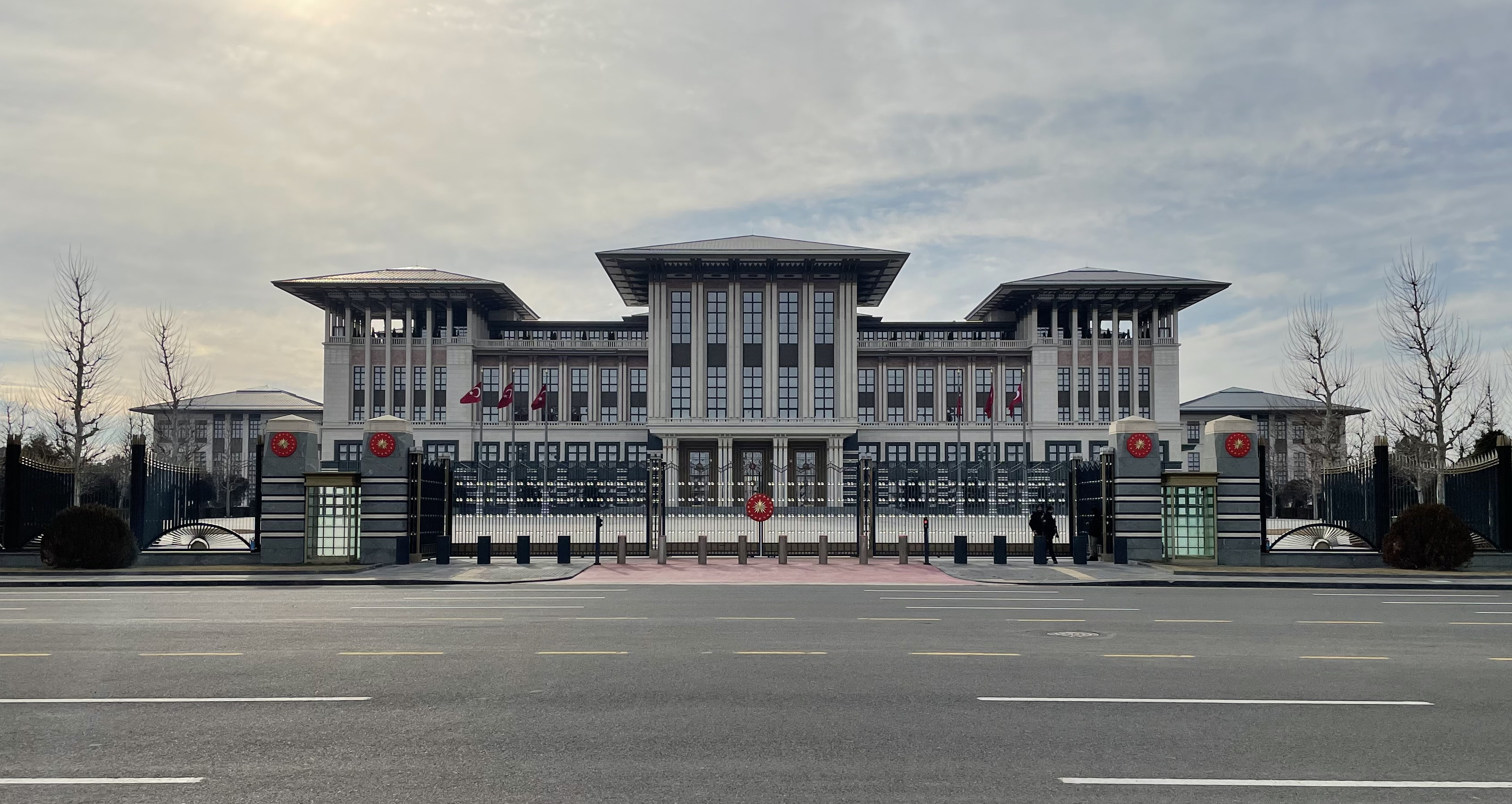
The Presidential Complex, The Official Residence of the President of Turkey.

- Presidential Complex (President, official residence)
- Huber Mansion (President)
- Beylerbeyi Palace (President)
- Dolmabahçe Palace (President)
- Ahlat Mansion (President)
- Çankaya Mansion (Vice President)
- Vahdettin Pavilion (State guest house)
- Florya Marine Mansion (President, formerly)

===== Former =====
- Topkapı Palace (Ottoman monarchy)
- Yıldız Palace (Ottoman monarchy)

==== Turkmenistan ====
- Oguzkhan Presidential Palace (President)

==== United Arab Emirates ====
- Presidential Diwan in Abu Dhabi (President)
- Zabeel Palace in Dubai (Vice President & Prime minister)

==== Uzbekistan ====
- Oqsaroy (President)
- Kuksaroy (President)

==== Vietnam ====
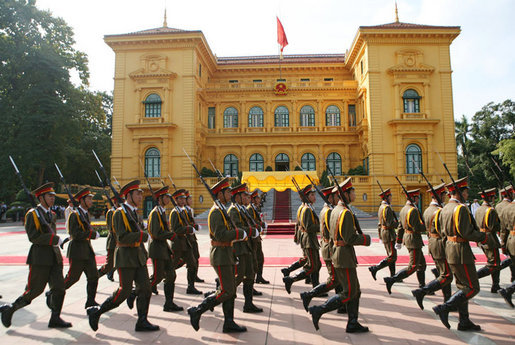
Presidential Palace, Hanoi

- Presidential Palace
- Government Office (Prime Minister)
- 1A Hùng Vương, Ba Đình, Hà Nội General Secretary's Residence

===== Former =====
- Ho Chi Minh's Stilt House, (Former residence of Ho Chi Minh)
- Independence Palace, (now the Reunification Convention Hall, former residence of the President of South Vietnam)
- Gia Long Palace
- Imperial City, Huế (former residence of the Nguyen dynasty monarchs)
- Imperial Citadel of Thang Long (located in Hanoi, former residence of Vietnamese dynasties)

==== Yemen ====
- Presidential Palace

=== Europe ===
==== Albania ====
- Prime Minister's Office
- Pallati i Brigadave
- Ish-Blloku (former residence of Enver Hoxha)

==== Armenia ====
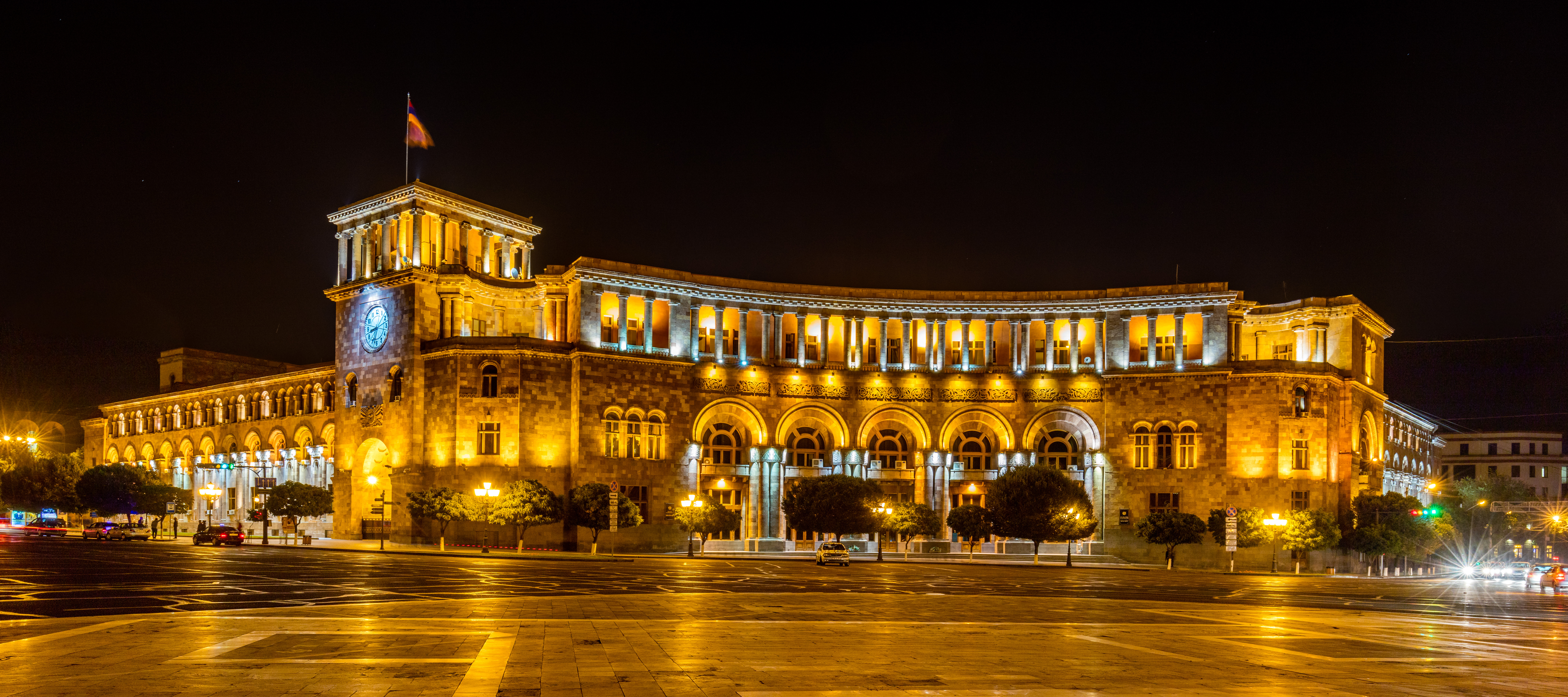
The Government House, Yerevan

- President's Residence
- Prime Minister's Vacation House, in Sevan (President, retreat)
- Prime Minister's Residence
- Government House

==== Austria ====
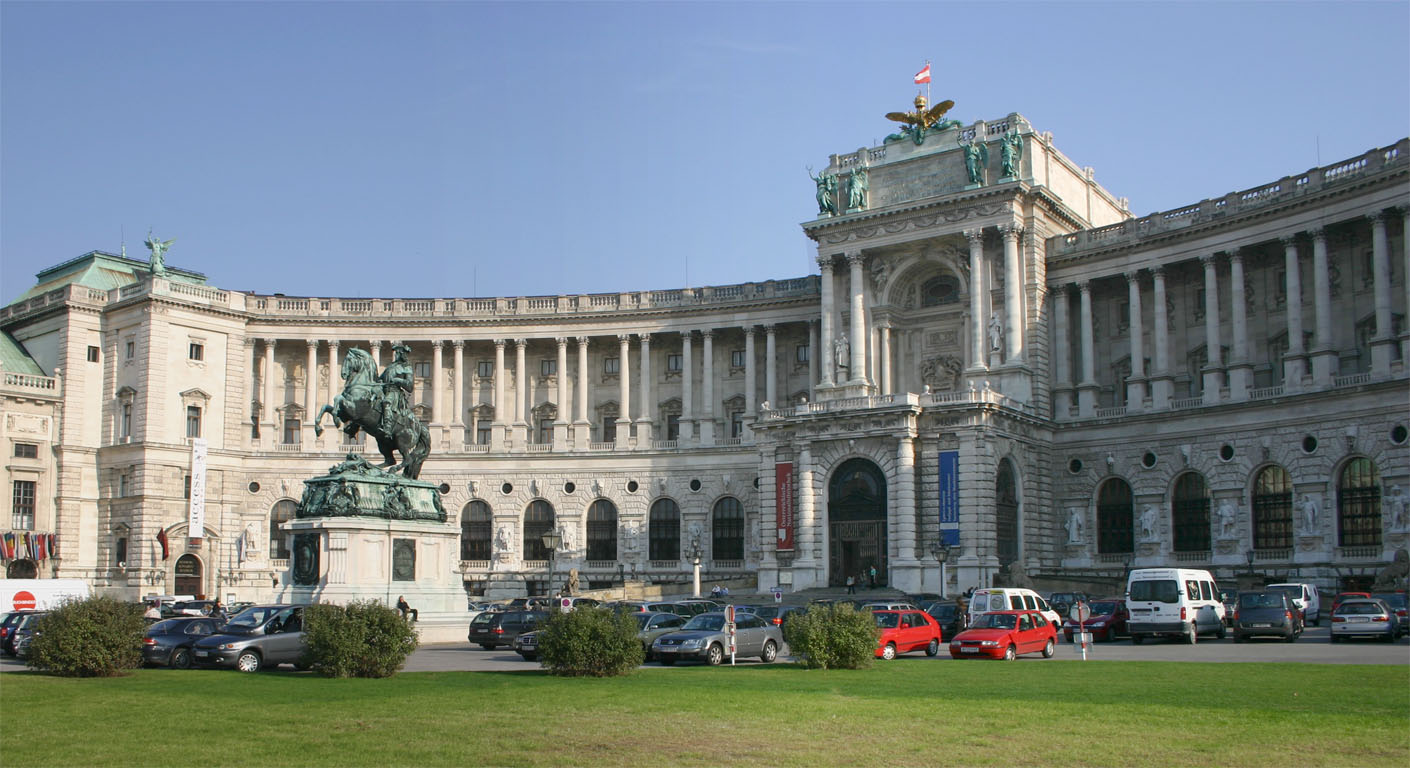
Hofburg Neue Burg section, seen from Heldenplatz.

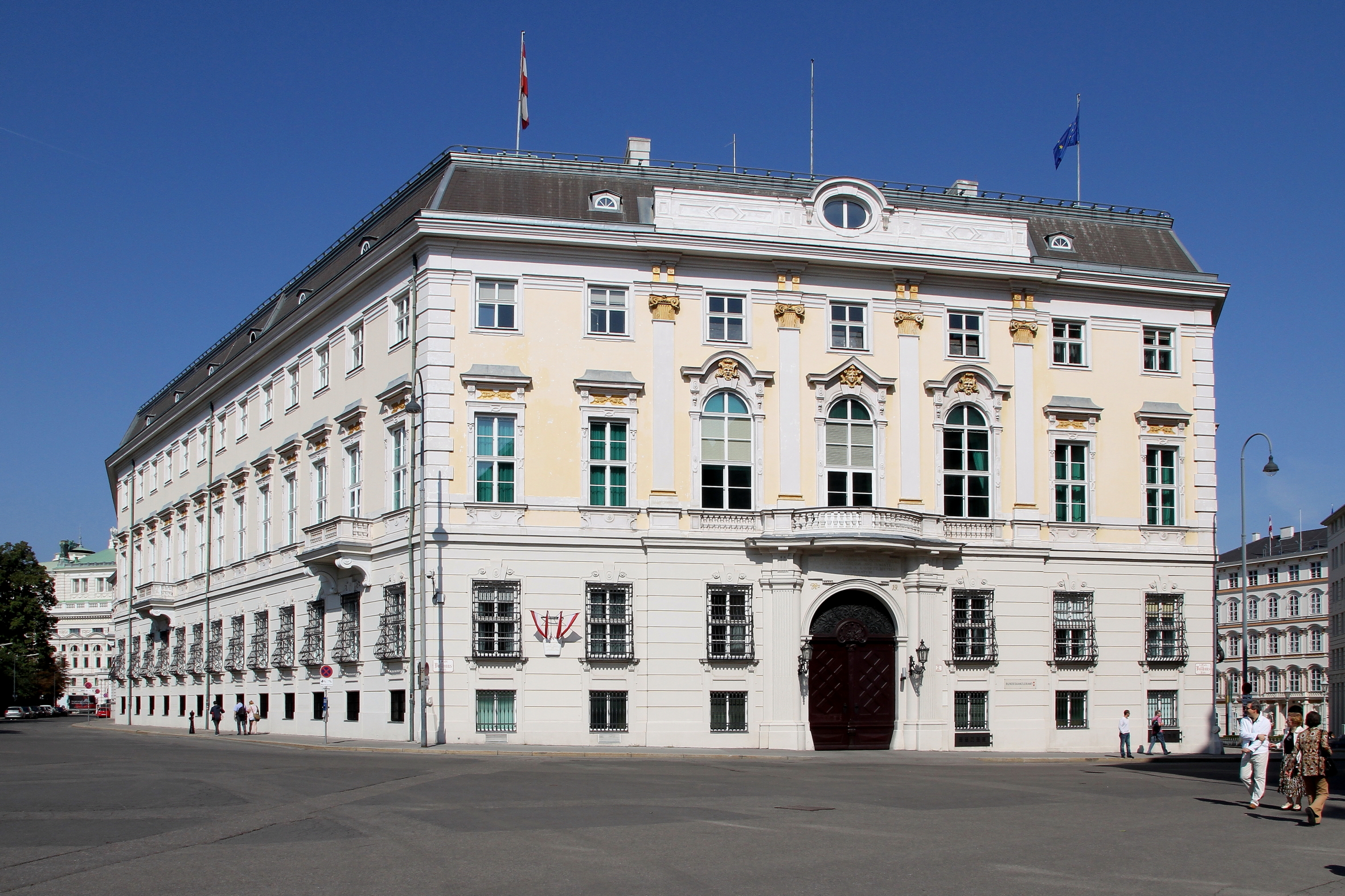
Ballhausplatz Nr. 2

- Ballhausplatz (Federal Chancellery)
- Hofburg (President, formerly the Emperor)
- Jagdschloss Mürzsteg (Summer retreat of the President)

===== Former imperial residences =====
- Schönbrunn Palace

==== Azerbaijan ====
- Residence of Zagulba (President of Azerbaijan)
- Government House, Baku (Prime Minister of Azerbaijan)

==== Belarus ====
Independence Palace, residence of the president of Belarus

- Independence Palace of Belarus (President)
- Old Presidential Residence (President)

==== Belgium ====
- Royal Palace of Brussels (Monarch's working palace)
- Château de Laeken (Monarch's residence)
- Ciergnon Castle (Monarch's Ardennes residence)
- The Lambermont (Prime Minister's residence)
- Rue de la Loi/Wetstraat 16 (Prime Minister's office)

==== Bosnia and Herzegovina ====
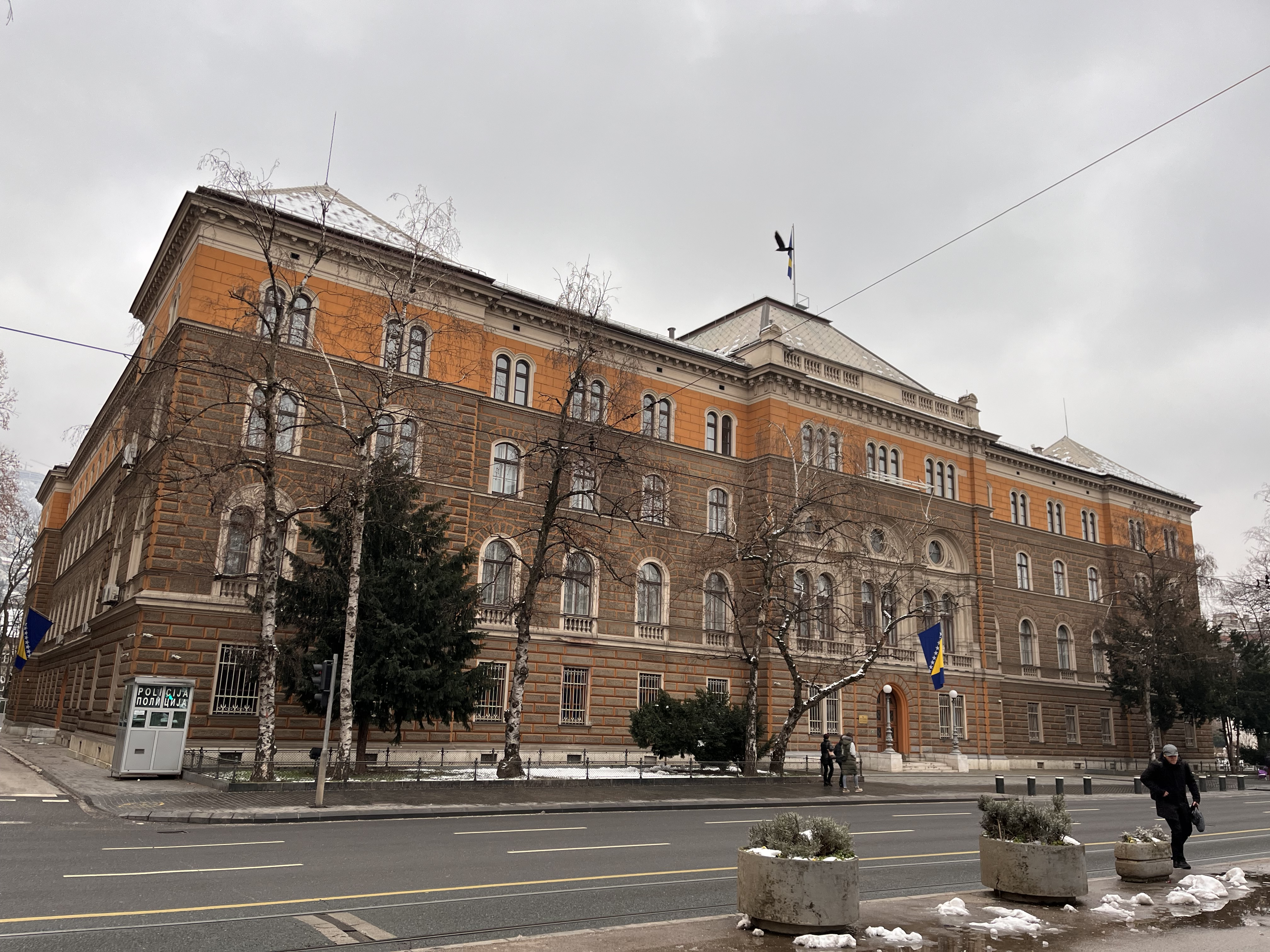
Building of the Presidency of Bosnia and Herzegovina

- Presidency Building
- Konak Residence (state guest house)

==== Bulgaria ====
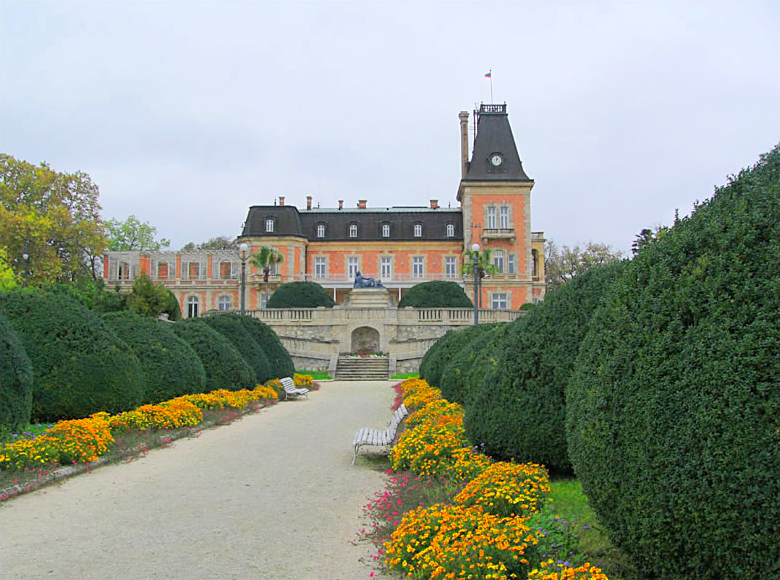
Euxinograd palace, Bulgaria

===== Current =====
- The Largo (A complex of government office buildings in Sofia):
  - Dondukov 1 (The office of the Council of Ministers)
  - Dondukov 2 (The office of the President)
  - National Assembly office building
- Boyana Residence (A complex of residential buildings outside Sofia):
  - Home No. 1 (National History Museum)
  - Home No. 2 (Residences of the members of the Cabinet)
  - Villa Kalina (The home of the President)
- Euxinograd (former royal residence outside Varna; currently used by the President and Prime Minister)

===== Former royal residences =====
- The Royal Palace (former royal residence in Sofia; currently the National Art Gallery)
- Vrana Palace (former royal residence outside Sofia; currently used by Tsar Simeon II)
- Tsarska Bistritsa (former royal residence outside Samokov; currently used by Tsar Simeon II)

==== Croatia ====
- Predsjednički dvori (President)
- Banski dvori (Government)

==== Cyprus ====
- Presidential Palace

==== Czech Republic ====
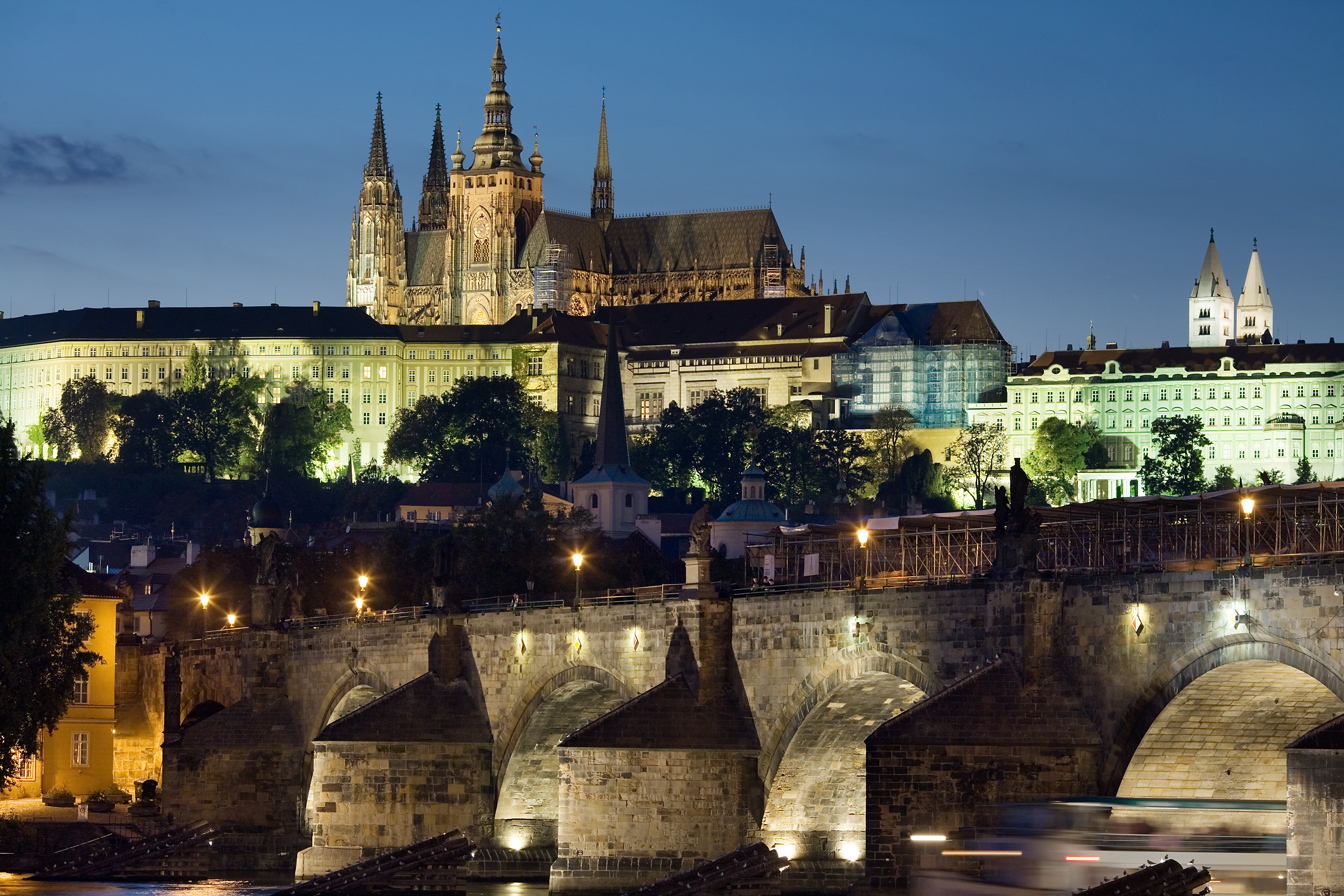
Prague Castle, the residence of the president of the Czech Republic

- Prague Castle (President)
- Lány Castle (President, summer residence)
- Kramář's Villa (Prime Minister, residence)
- Straka Academy (Prime Minister, office)

==== Denmark ====
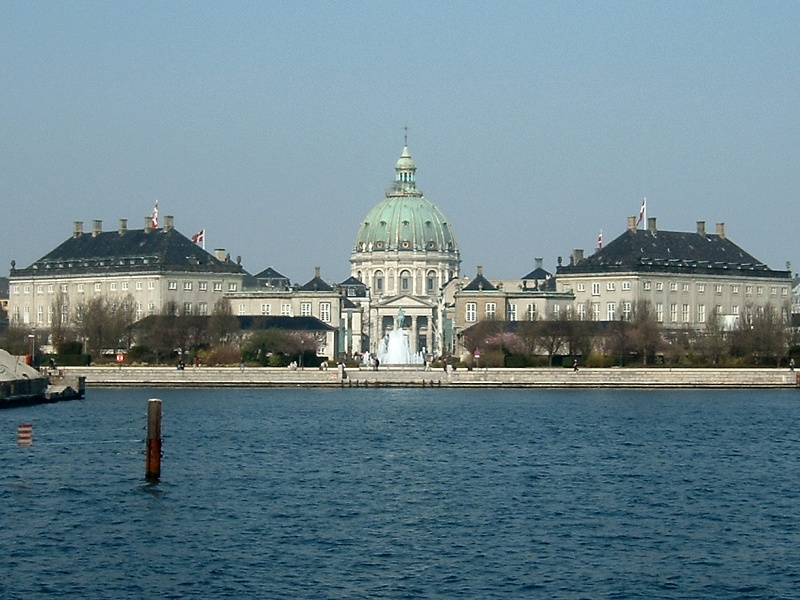
Amalienborg Palace, Denmark

- Amalienborg Palace (Monarch, official and winter residence)
- Fredensborg Palace (Monarch, spring and autumn residence)
- Gråsten Palace (Monarch, summer residence)
- Marselisborg Palace (Monarch, summer retreat)
- The Hermitage Palace (Monarch)
- Sorgenfri Palace (Monarch)
- Marienborg (Prime Minister, Official Residence/Summer Retreat)

===== Former =====
- Christiansborg Palace (still in state official use; seat of Parliament and office of the Prime Minister)
- Frederiksborg Palace
- Kronborg
- Rosenborg Castle
- Frederiksberg Palace

==== Estonia ====
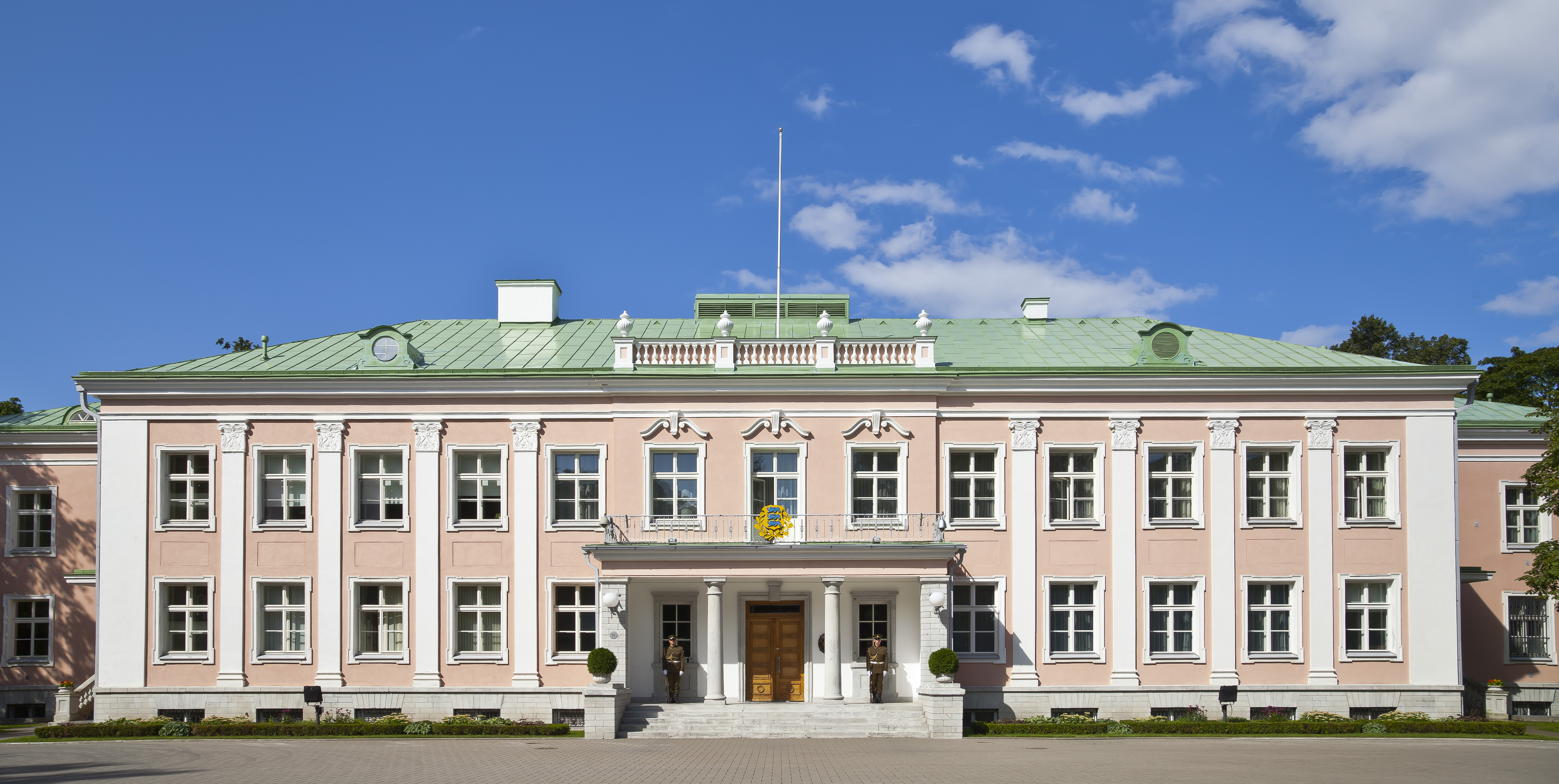
Presidential Palace in Kadriorg, Tallinn

- Presidential Palace (President)
- Stenbock House (Prime minister)

===== Former =====
- Kadriorg Palace (President, 1938–1940, formerly; kept as museum)
- Oru Palace (President, 1935–1940, summer residence)
- Paslepa Residence (President, 199?–2008, summer residence)

==== Finland ====
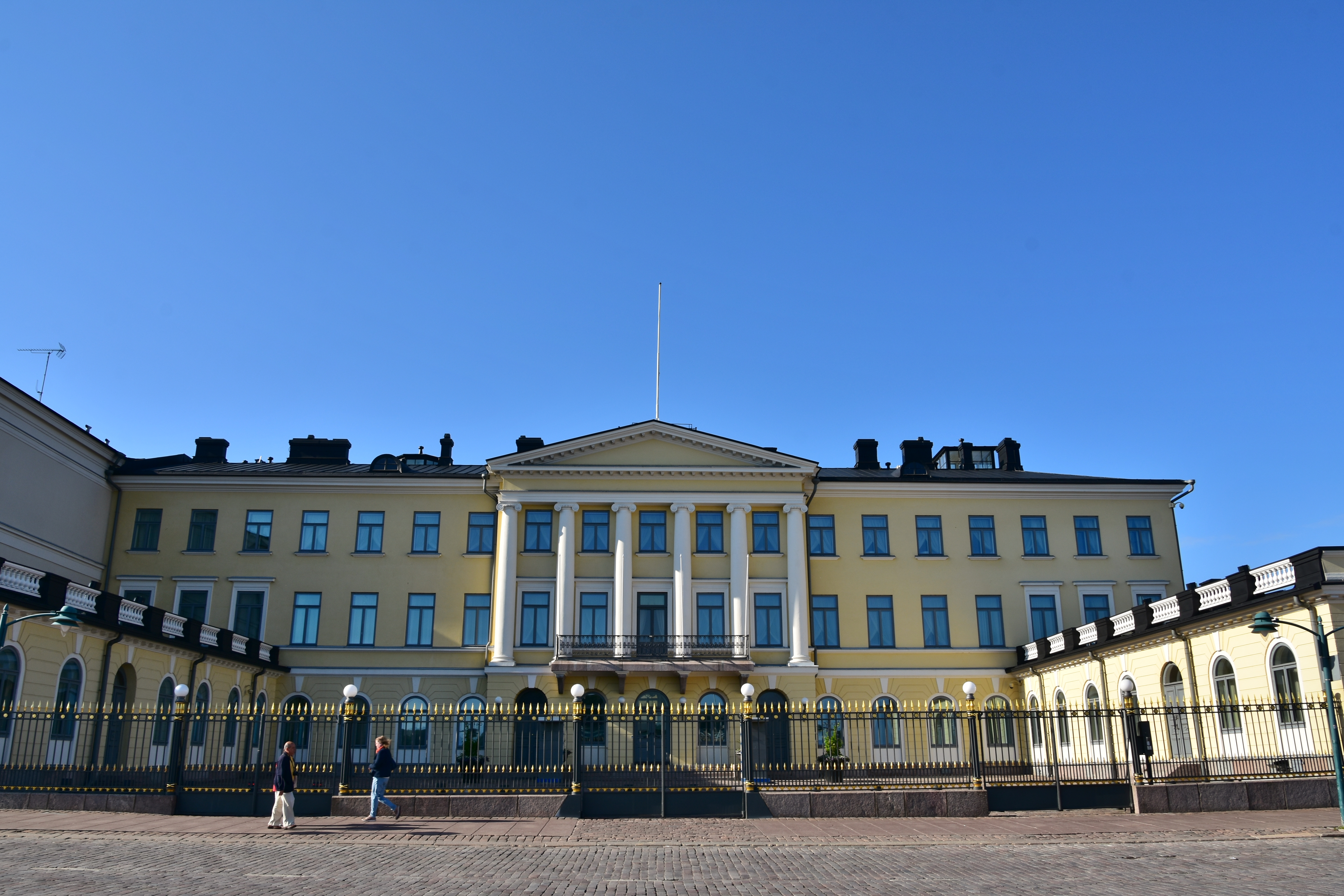
The Presidential Palace, the official residence of the president of Finland.

- Presidential Palace (president, state official use)
- Mäntyniemi, also Talludden (private residence President)
- Kultaranta, also Gullranda (summer residence the President)
- Kesäranta, also Villa Bjälbo (Prime Minister)

===== Former =====
- Tamminiemi (President, formerly; kept as Urho Kekkonen Museum)

==== France ====
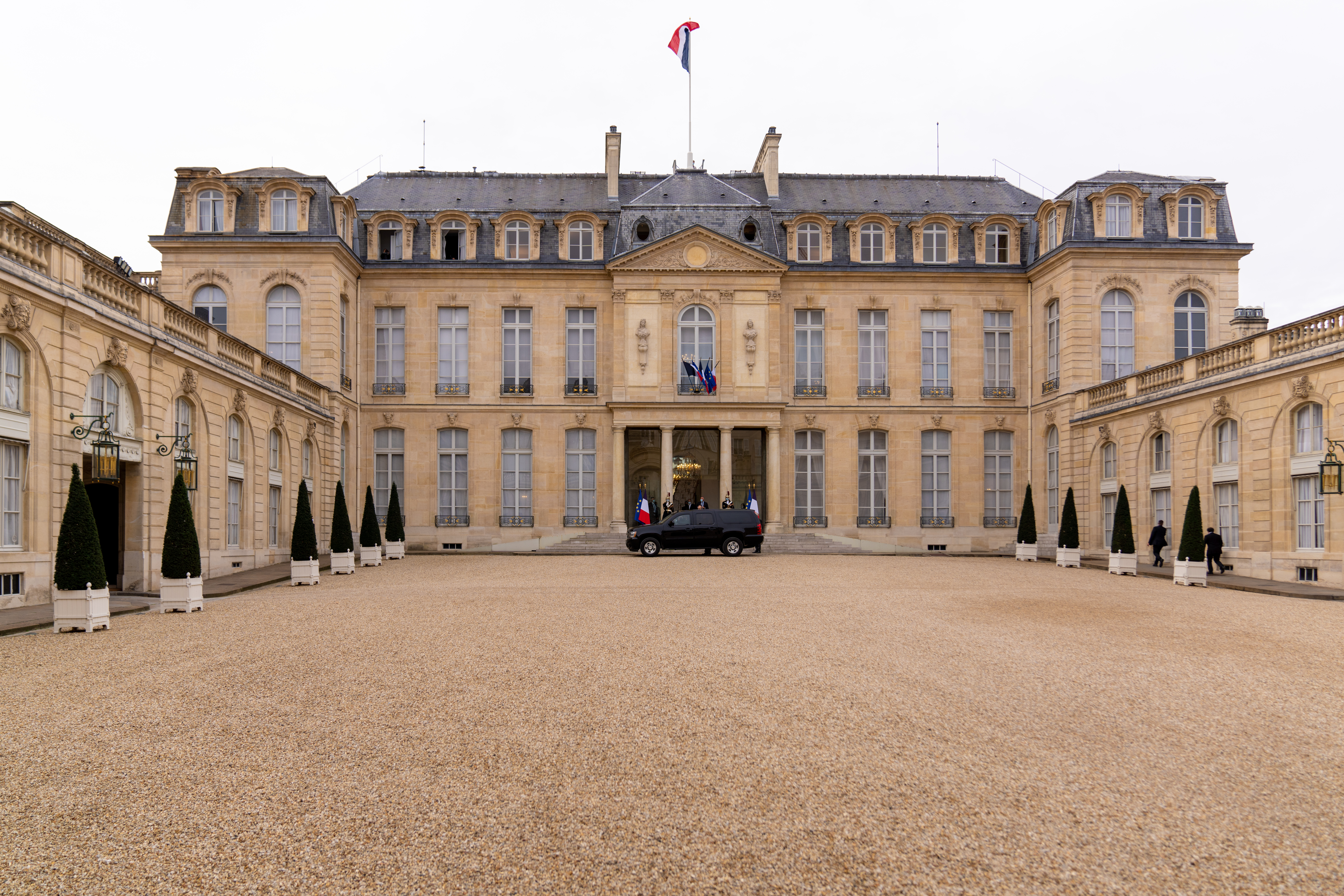
Élysée Palace

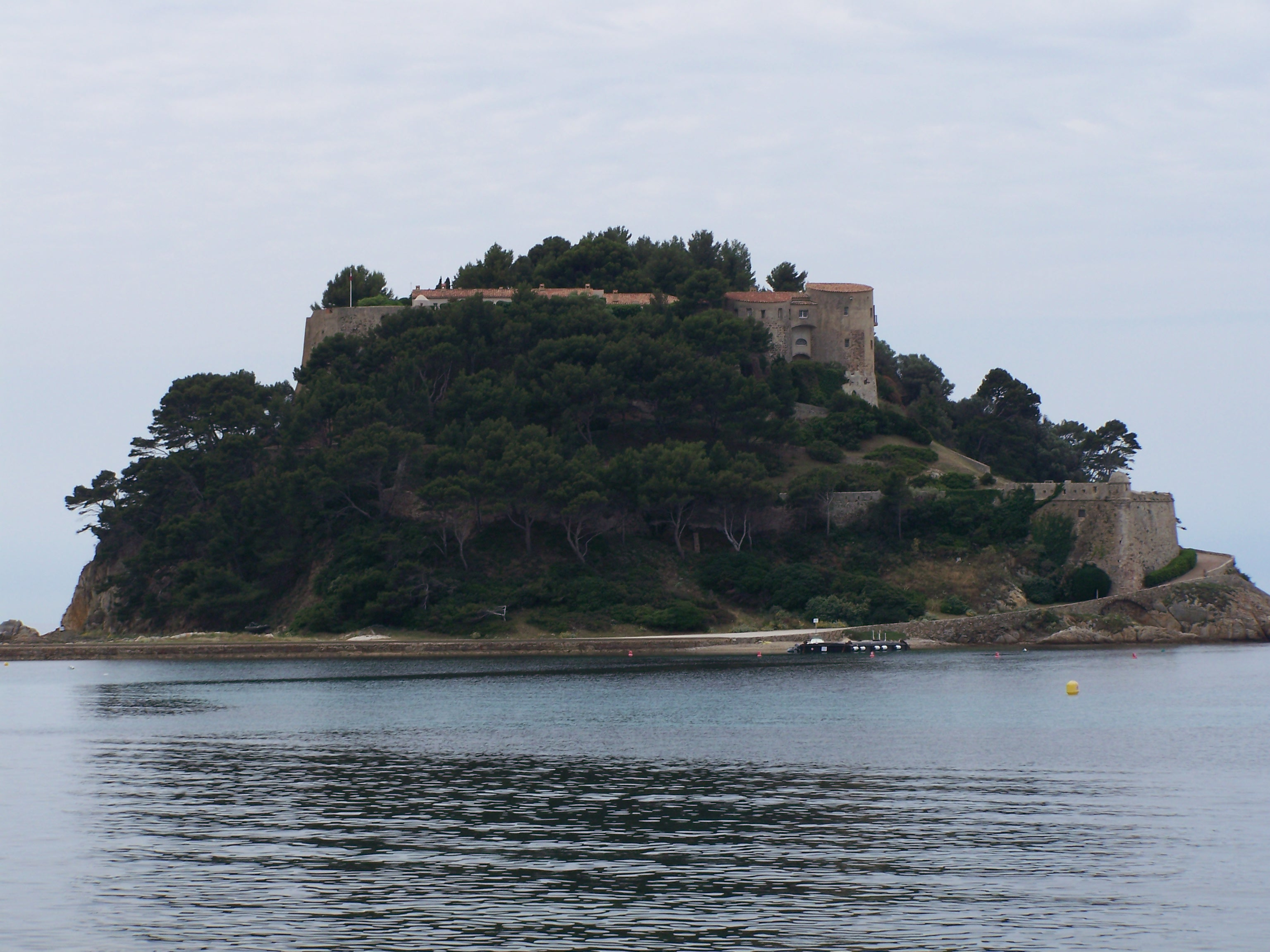
Brégançon Fort

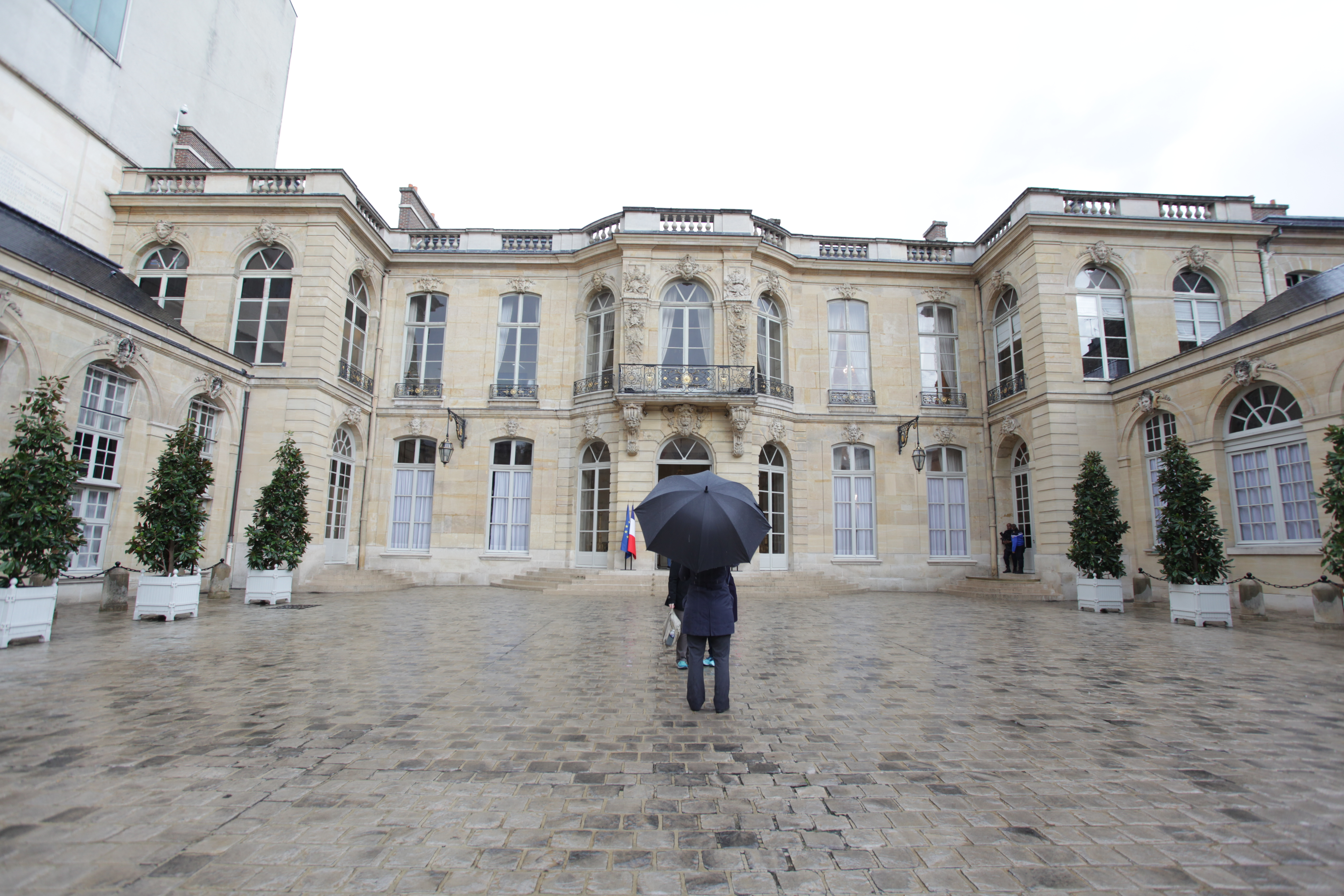
Hôtel Matignon

- Élysée Palace (President)
- La Lanterne (Versailles) (President, retreat)
- Fort de Brégançon (President, summer residence)
- Hôtel de Matignon (Prime Minister)
- Domaine de Souzy-la-Briche (Prime Minister, summer residence)
- Petit Luxembourg (President of the Senate)
- Hôtel de Lassay (President of the National Assembly)
- Hôtel de Marigny (state guest house)
- Château de Rambouillet (President, former summer residence)

===== Former royal and imperial residences =====
- Château de Blois
- Château de Chambord
- Château de Compiègne
- Château de Malmaison
- Château de Saint-Germain-en-Laye
- Louvre Castle
- Palace of Fontainebleau
- Palace of Versailles
- Tuileries
- Palais de la Cité
- Palace of Aachen

===== Territorial =====
French Polynesia

- Presidence (President of French Polynesia)
- Haut Commissariat (High Commissioner of French Polynesia)

===== Other =====
The following are official residences maintained by private, nongovernmental institutions:

- Clairefontaine-en-Yvelines:
  Château de Saint-Rémy-des-Landes (residence of the chairman of LVMH)

==== Georgia ====
- Avlabari Presidential Palace (2009–2018)
- Orbeliani Palace (since 2018)

==== Germany ====
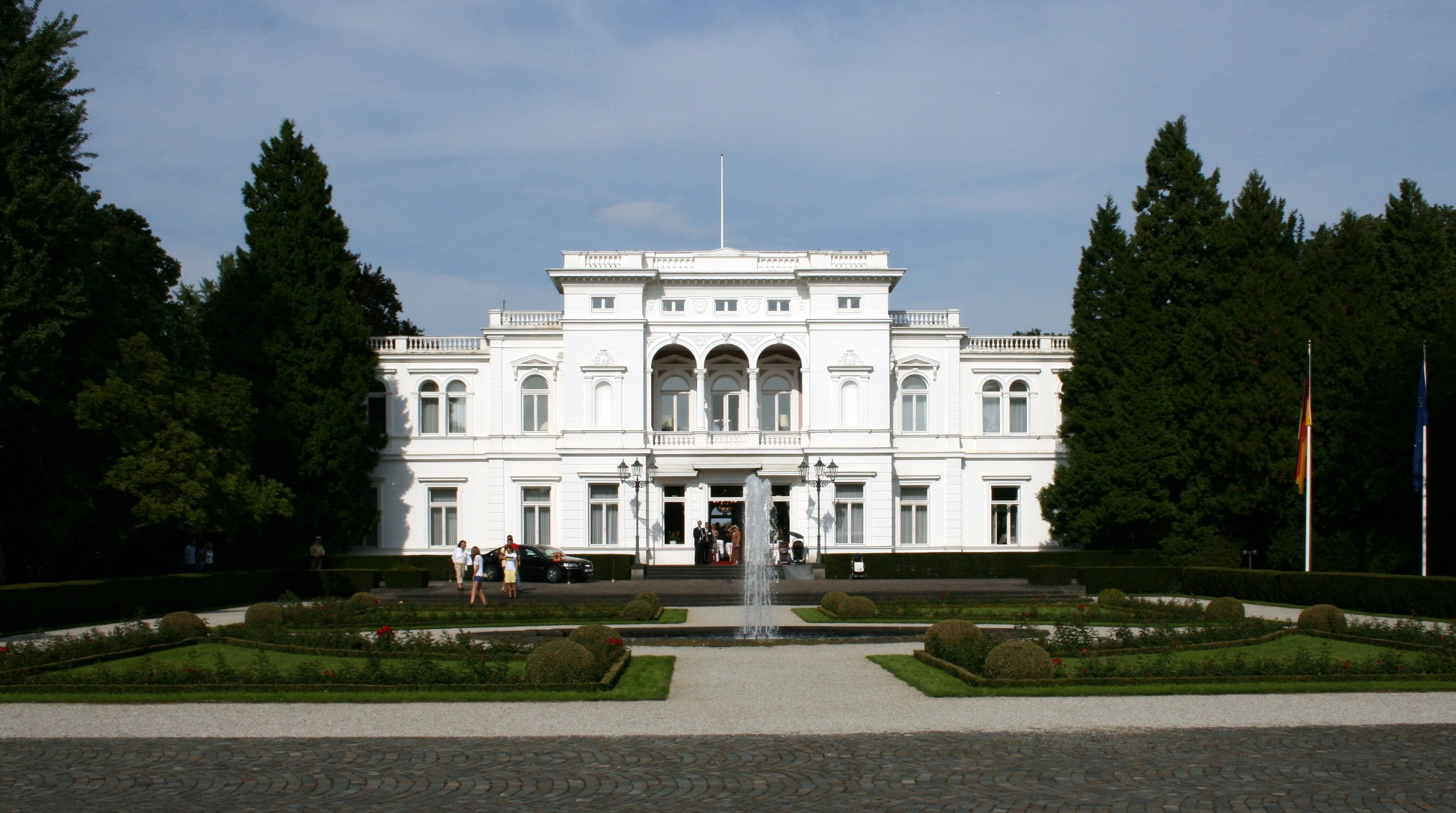
Villa Hammerschmidt

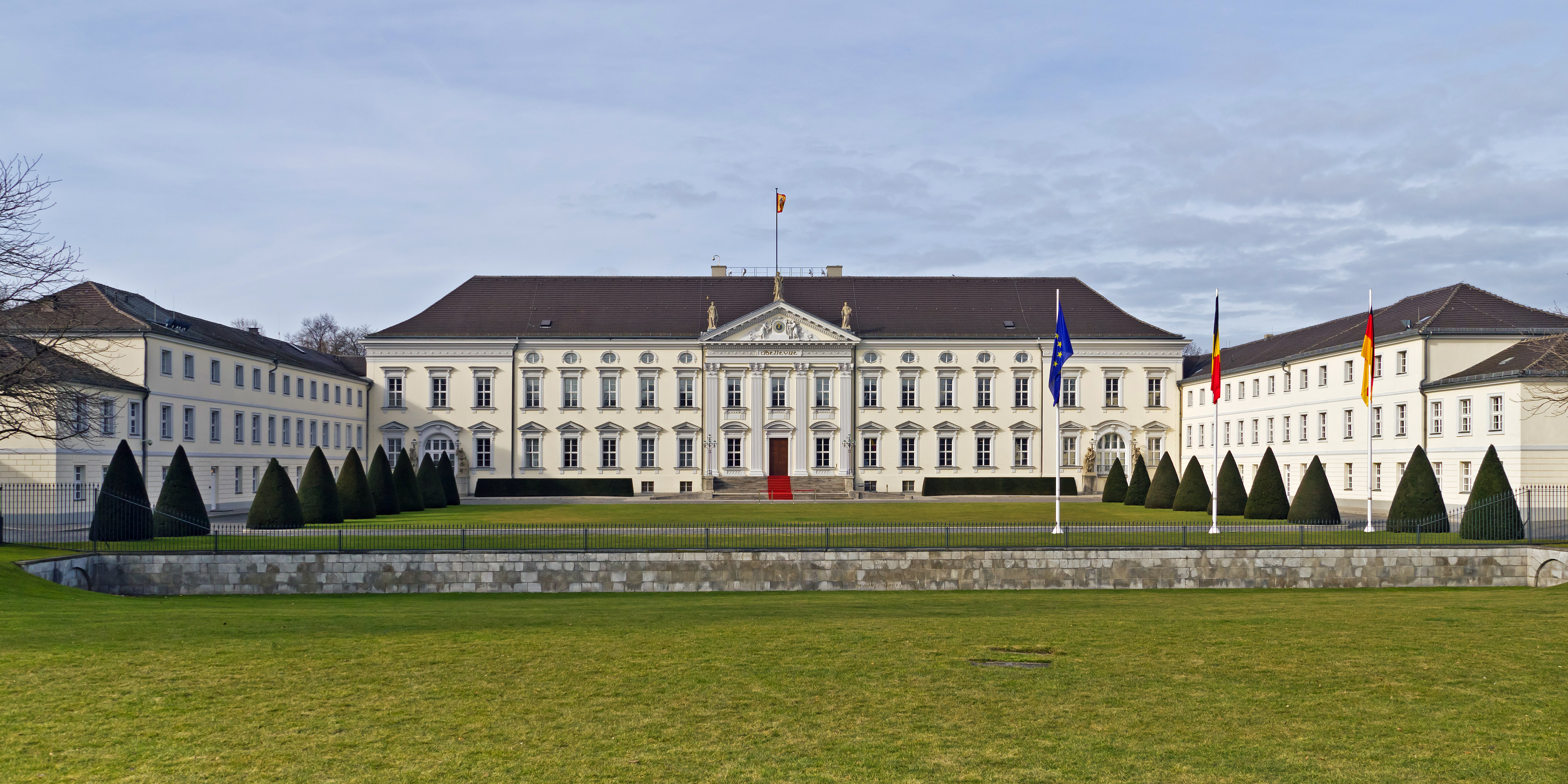
Schloss Bellevue

===== Current =====
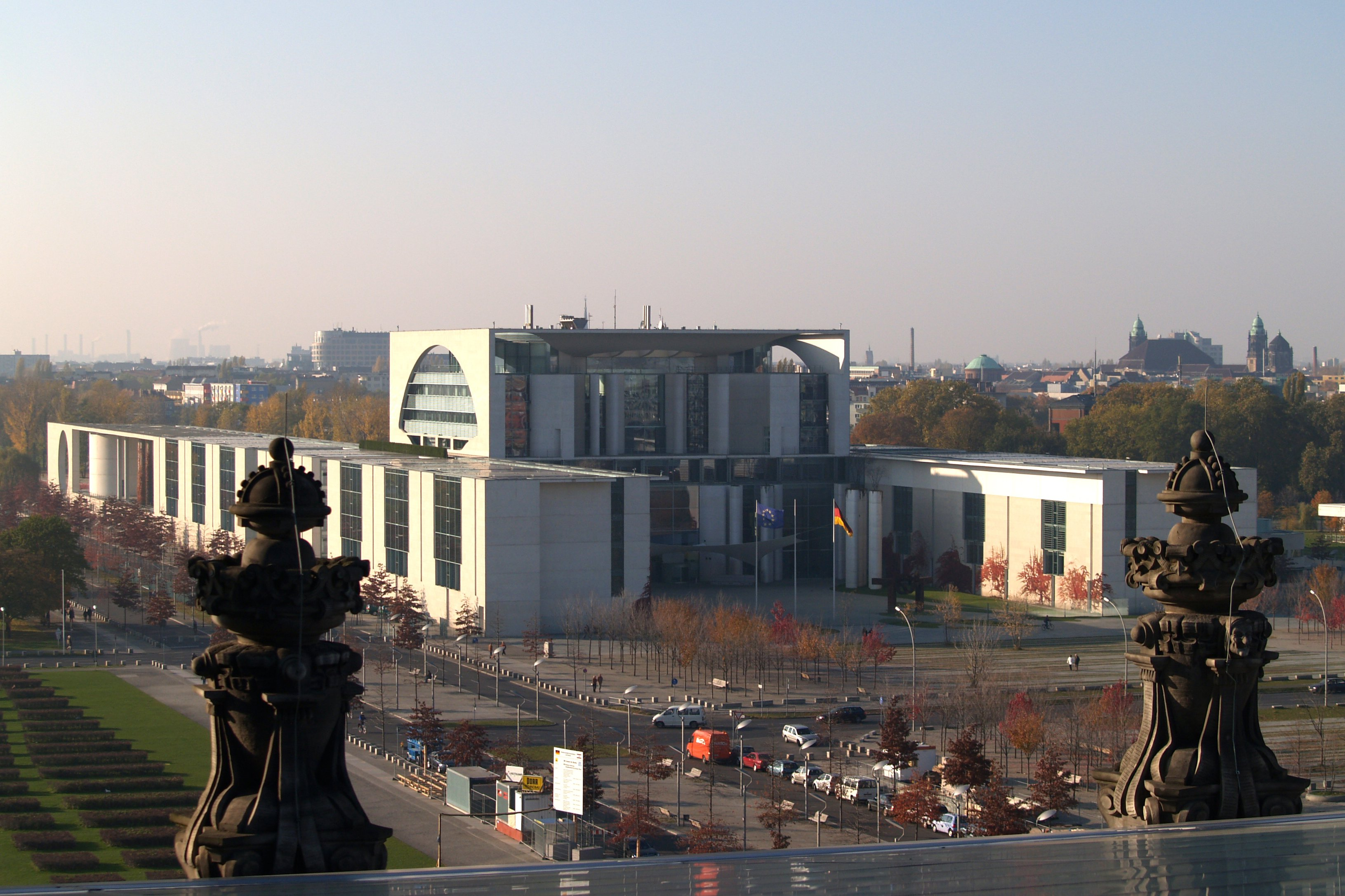
Bundeskanzleramt

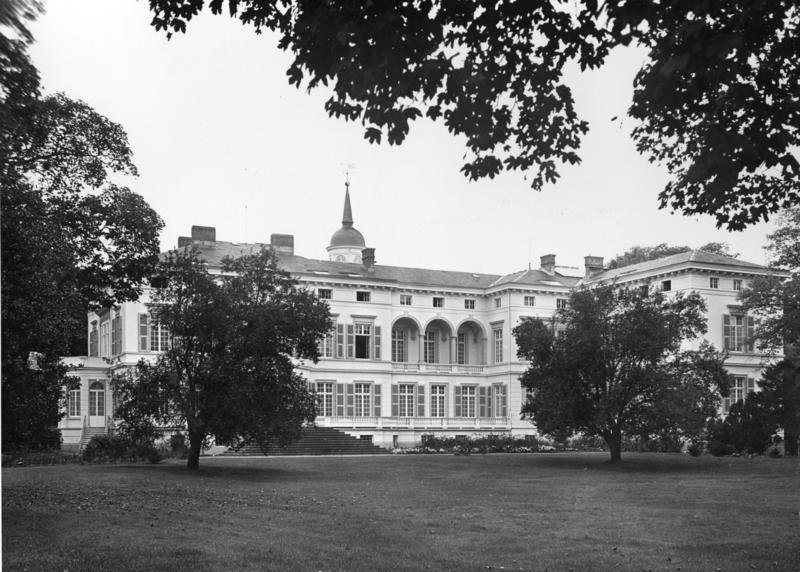
Palais Schaumburg

Federal

- Schloss Bellevue and Villa Wurmbach (President, residence)
- Official residence in the Spreebogen (President, interim residence)
- Bundespräsidialamt (President, office)
- Villa Hammerschmidt (President, retreat)
- Bundeskanzleramt (Chancellor, residence)
- Palais Schaumburg (Chancellor, retreat)
- Schloss Meseberg, Gransee (Official Guest house for Berlin)
- Gästehaus auf dem Petersberg, Königswinter (Official Guest house for Bonn)

====== States ======
- Villa Reitzenstein, Stuttgart, State of Baden-Württemberg
- Bayerische Staatskanzlei, Munich, Free State of Bavaria
- Rotes Rathaus, Berlin, City State of Berlin
- Staatskanzlei Brandenburg, Potsdam, State of Brandenburg
- Haus der Bürgerschaft, Bremen, Free Hanseatic City of Bremen
- Hamburg Rathaus, Hamburg, Free and Hanseatic City of Hamburg
- Grand Hotel Rose (chancery) and Villa von Schertel (residence), Wiesbaden, State of Hesse
- Staatskanzlei Mecklenburg-Vorpommern, Schwerin, State of Mecklenburg-Vorpommern
- Niedersächsische Staatskanzlei, Hanover, State of Lower Saxony
- Landeshaus Düsseldorf, Düsseldorf, State of North Rhine-Westphalia
- Neues Zeughaus, Mainz, State of Rhineland-Palatinate
- Staatskanzlei des Saarlandes, Saarbrücken, State of Saarland
- Sächsische Staatskanzlei, Dresden, Free State of Saxony
- Palais am Fürstenwall, Magdeburg, State of Saxony-Anhalt
- Staatskanzlei Schleswig-Holstein, Kiel, Schleswig-Holstein
- Kurmainzische Statthalterei, Erfurt, Free State of Thuringia

===== Former royal residences =====
Brandenburg/Prussia/Imperial/East Germany/Former West Germany

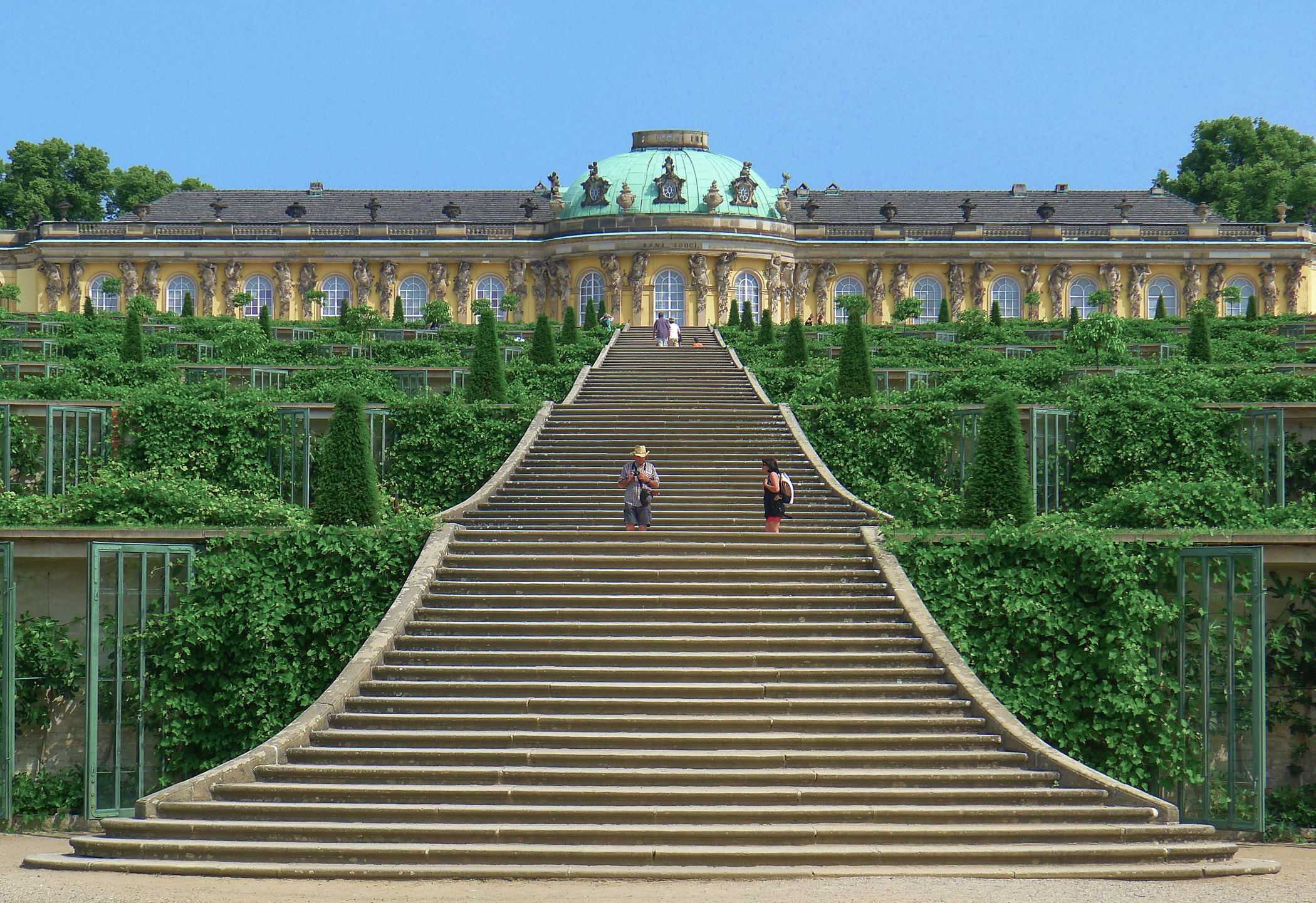
Sanssouci Palace

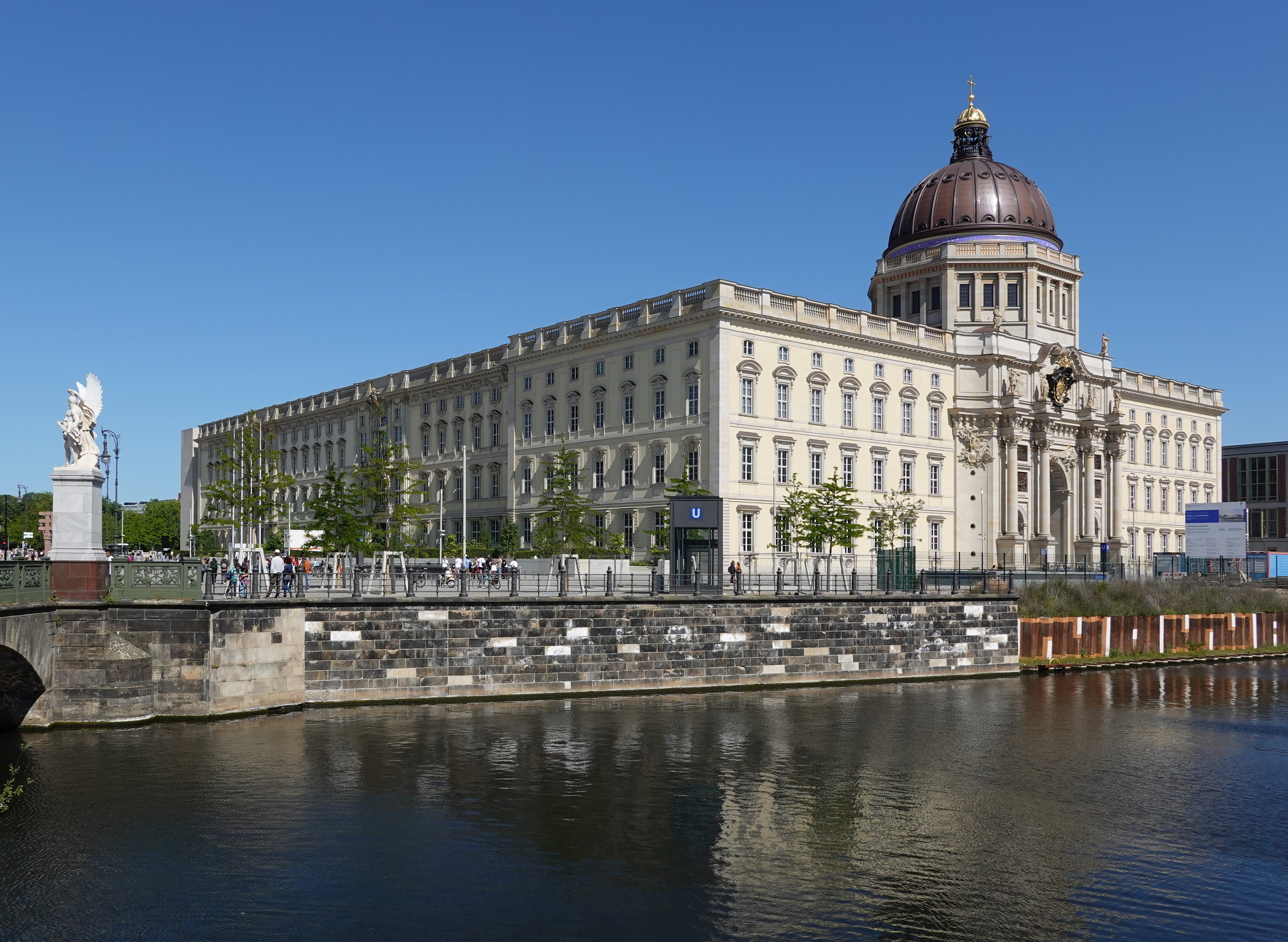
Berlin Palace

- Potsdam City Palace, Potsdam (now Landtag of Brandenburg seat)
- Babelsberg Palace, Potsdam
- Cecilienhof, Potsdam
- New Palace, Potsdam
- Sanssouci, Potsdam
- Berlin Palace, Berlin
- Charlottenburg Palace, Berlin
- Kronprinzenpalais, Berlin
- Reich Chancellery (office of the Chancellor of Germany)
- Friedrichsruh Manor, (Otto von Bismarck's residence in Herzogtum Lauenburg, Schleswig-Holstein, near Hamburg)
- Varzin Manor, (Otto von Bismarck's residence in Farther Pomerania)
- Führerbunker, (Adolf Hitler's Berlin residence)
- Berghof, (Adolf Hitler's Berchtesgaden residence)
- Kehlsteinhaus (Adolf Hitler's Berchtesgaden residence)
- Wolf's Lair (Adolf Hitler's first Eastern Front military headquarters in World War II)
- Führer Headquarters
- Schoenhausen Palace, Berlin East German President (1949–1960)
- Majakowskiring, Berlin East German Leadership compound (to 1960),
- Waldsiedlung, East German Leadership compound (1960–1990), North of Berlin near Wandlitz, Brandenburg
- Bundeskanzleramt, Bonn, (Office of Chancellor of Germany, 1976–1999), today used for seat of Federal Ministry for Economic Cooperation and Development
- Kanzlerbungalow, Bonn, Private residence of the Chancellor of Germany and his family 1964–1999

Other

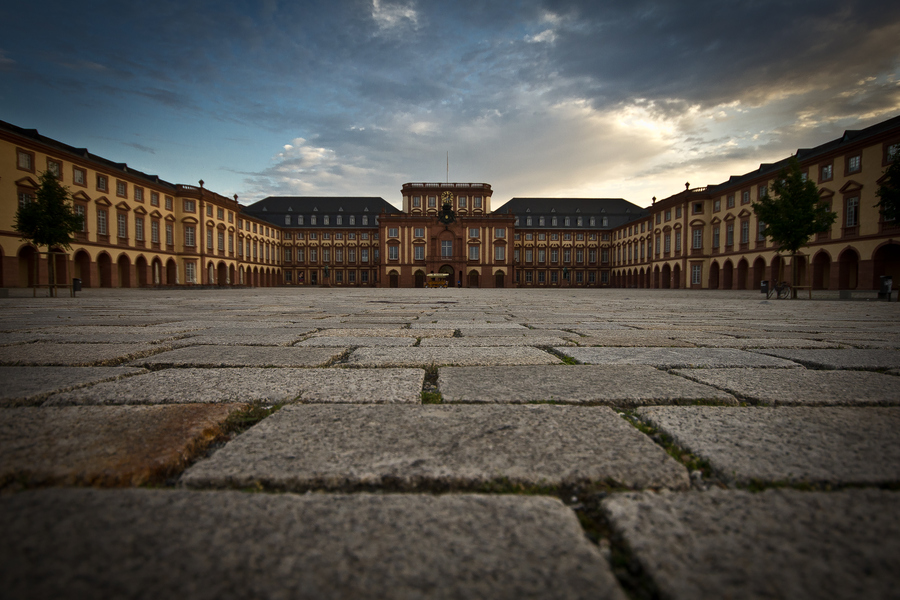
Mannheim Palace

- Dresden Castle
- Herrenhausen Palace
- Kaiserpfalz Goslar
- Karlsruhe Palace
- Leineschloss
- Ludwigsburg Palace
- Munich Residenz
- Mannheim Palace
- Schloss Oldenburg
- Residential Palace Darmstadt
- Schwerin Castle (Landtag of Mecklenburg-Vorpommern seat)
- Veste Coburg
- Schloss Weimar

==== Greece ====
- Presidential Mansion (President, formerly the King)
- Maximos Mansion (Prime Minister, office)

===== Former =====
- Palace of Dekeleia (Kings of Greece)

==== Hungary ====
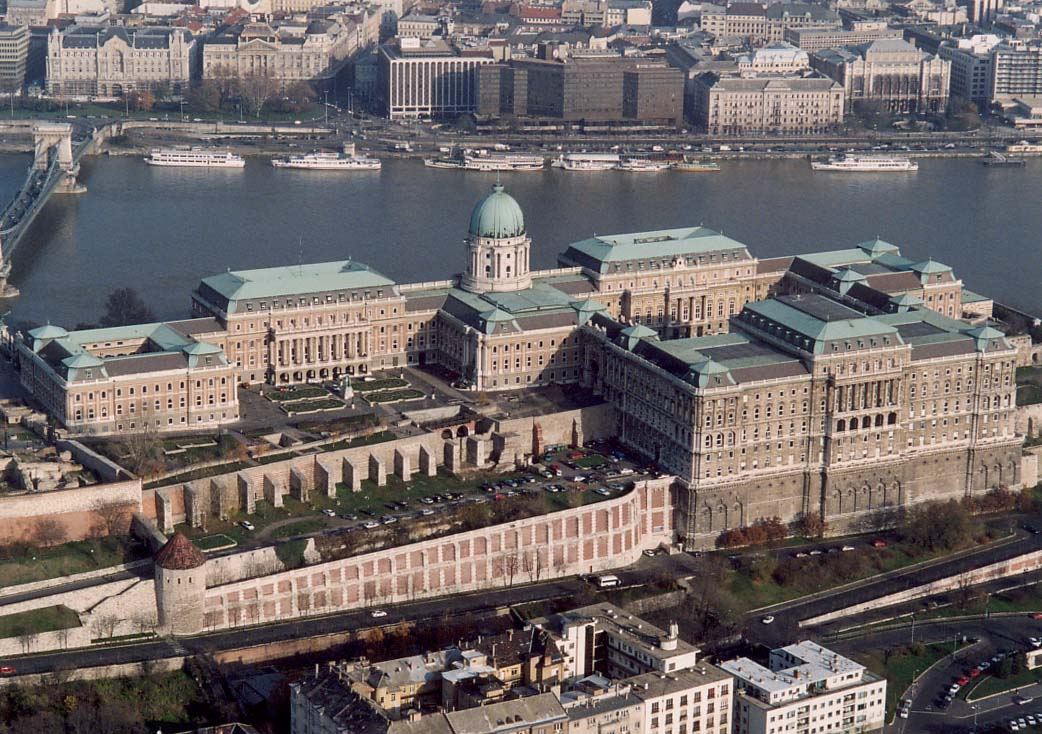
Buda Castle, Budapest

- Sándor Palace (President)
- Carmelite Monastery (Prime Minister)

===== Former =====
- Buda Castle (King, formerly; retained as Historical Museum of Budapest and Hungarian National Gallery)

==== Iceland ====
- Bessastaðir (President)

==== Ireland ====
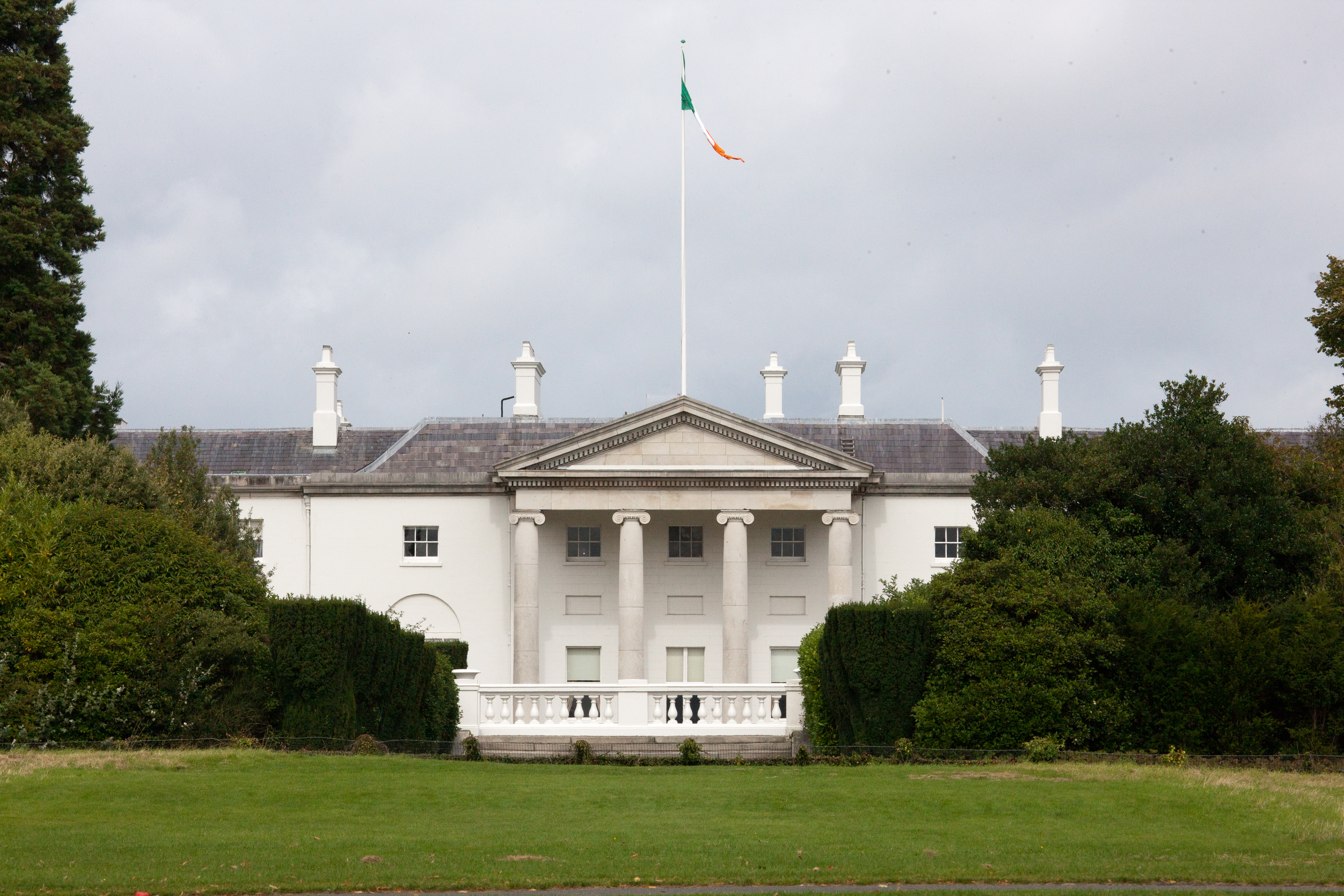
Áras an Uachtaráin, Dublin

- Áras an Uachtaráin (President)
- Steward's Lodge (Taoiseach's 'unofficial residence'; the Taoiseach's office is in Government Buildings, Dublin)
- Farmleigh (visiting foreign dignitaries)

===== Former =====
- Hill of Tara (Ard-Rí)
- Dublin Castle (seat of British rule prior to independence in 1922)
- Chief Secretary's Lodge, now the U.S. Ambassador's Residence (Chief Secretary for Ireland)
- Viceregal Lodge, now Áras an Uachtaráin (Lord Lieutenant / Governor-General)

==== Italy ====
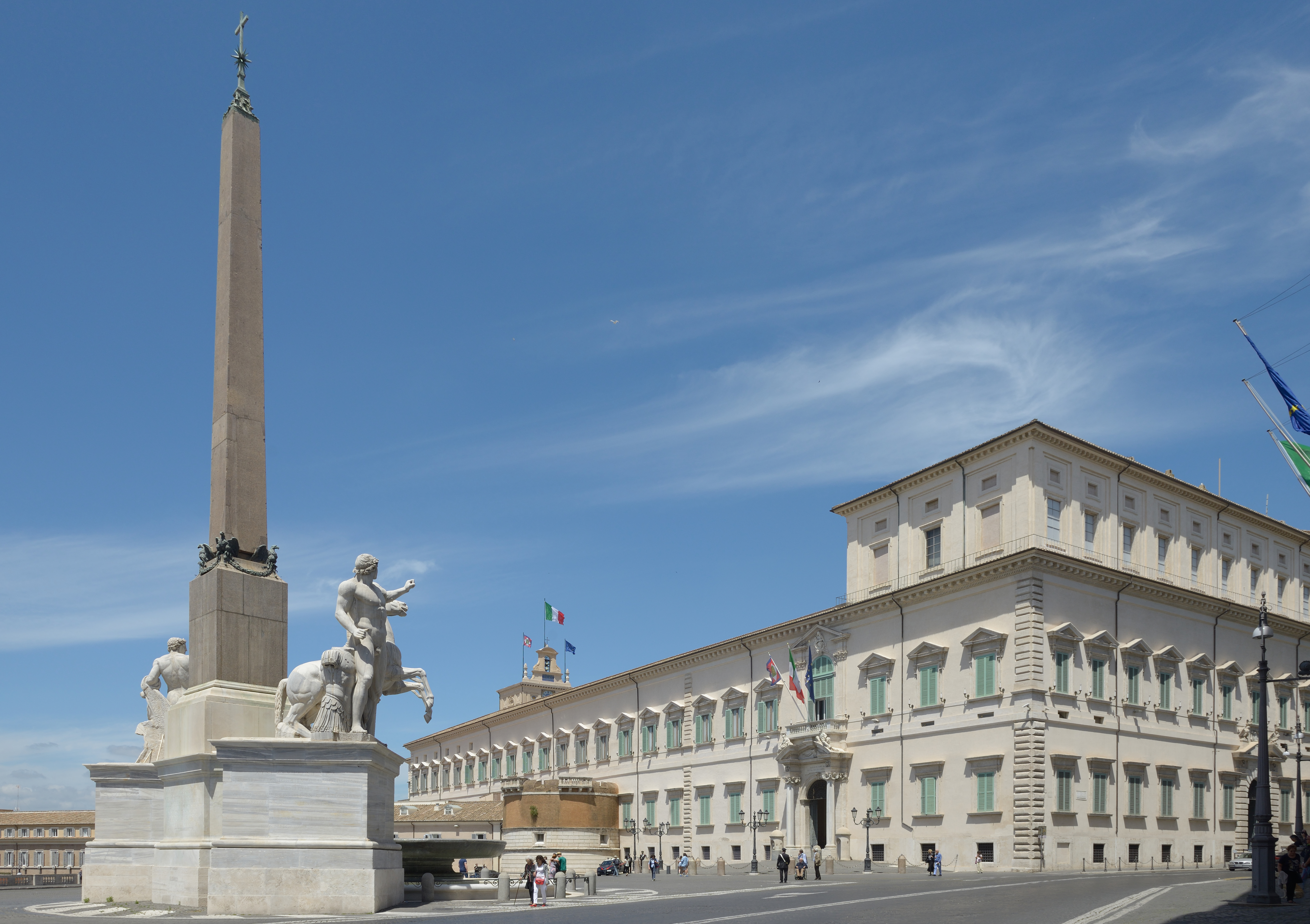
Palazzo del Quirinale

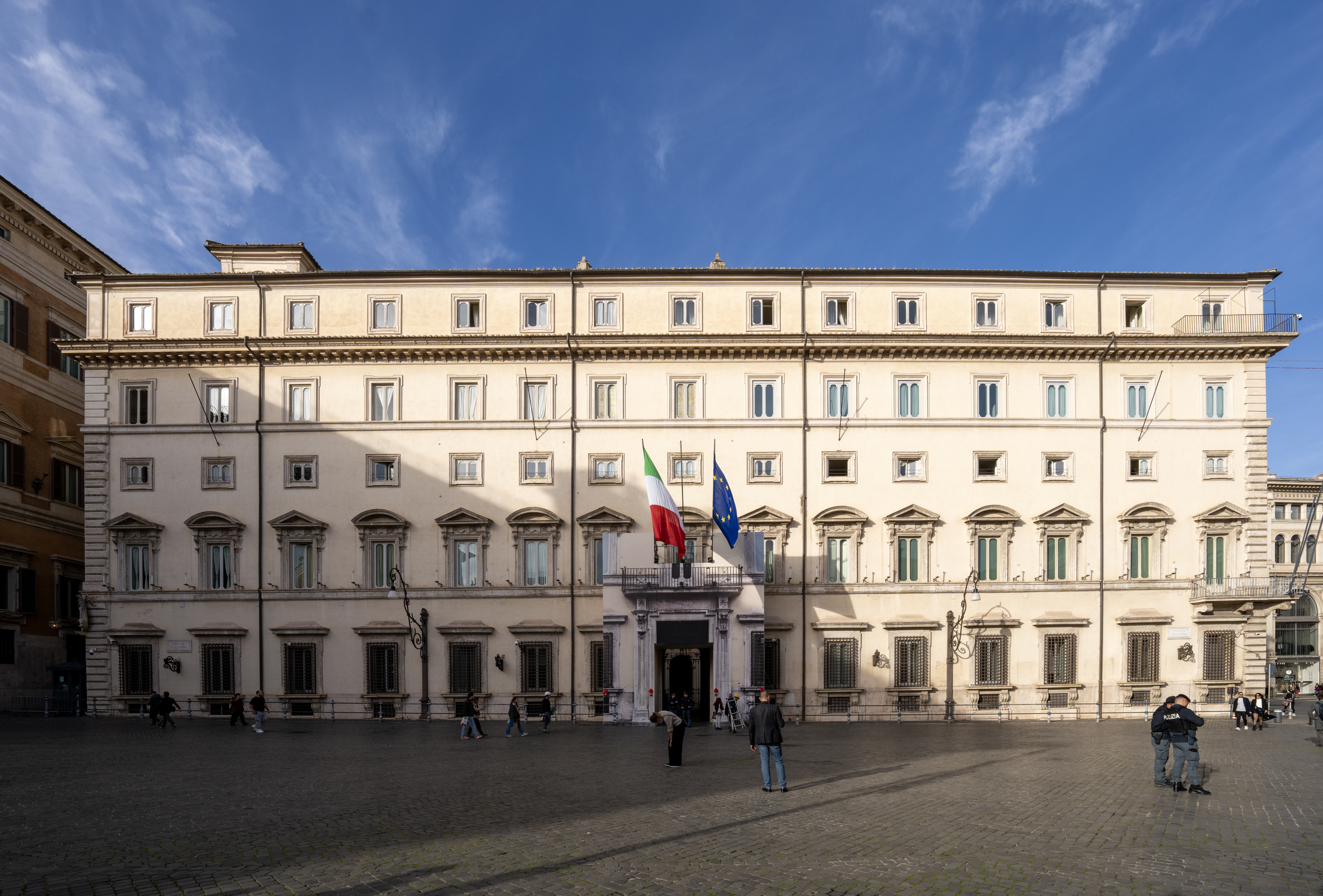
Palazzo Chigi

- Quirinal Palace (President, residence; formerly residence of the Pope and then of the King)
- Castelporziano (President, retreat)
- Villa Rosebery (President, summer retreat)
- Chigi Palace (Prime Minister)
- Villa Doria Pamphili (International meetings)
- Villa Madama (International meetings)
- Palazzo Giustiniani (President of the Senate)

===== Former residences =====
- Villa Farnese (former summer presidential residence)
- Palazzo del Viminale (formerly Prime Minister, now seat of the Ministry of the Interior)
- Palazzo Venezia (Mussolini's office)
- Villa Torlonia, Rome (Mussolini's residence)
- Residences of the Royal House of Savoy (Royal family's residences in Piedmont)
- Royal Palace of Caserta (Royal family)
- Royal Palace of Milan (Royal family)
- Royal Villa of Monza (Royal family)
- Royal Palace of Naples (Royal family)

==== Latvia ====
- Rīgas pils (President)

==== Liechtenstein ====
- Vaduz Castle (Prince)

==== Lithuania ====
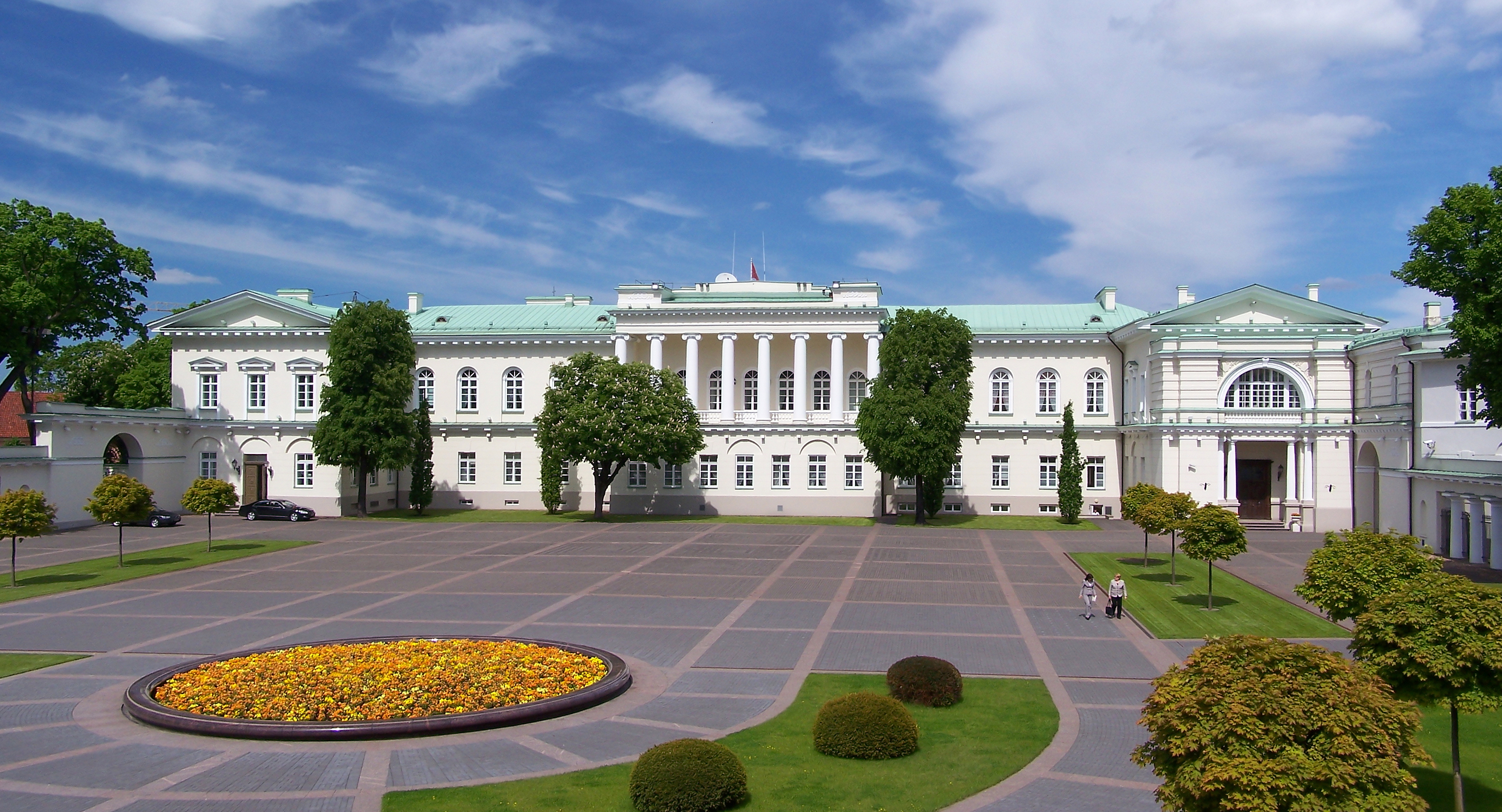
Presidential Palace, Vilnius

- Presidential Palace (President)

===== Former =====
- Historical Presidential Palace, Kaunas (President, formerly; kept as museum)
- Royal Palace of Lithuania (formerly Grand Duke)

==== Luxembourg ====
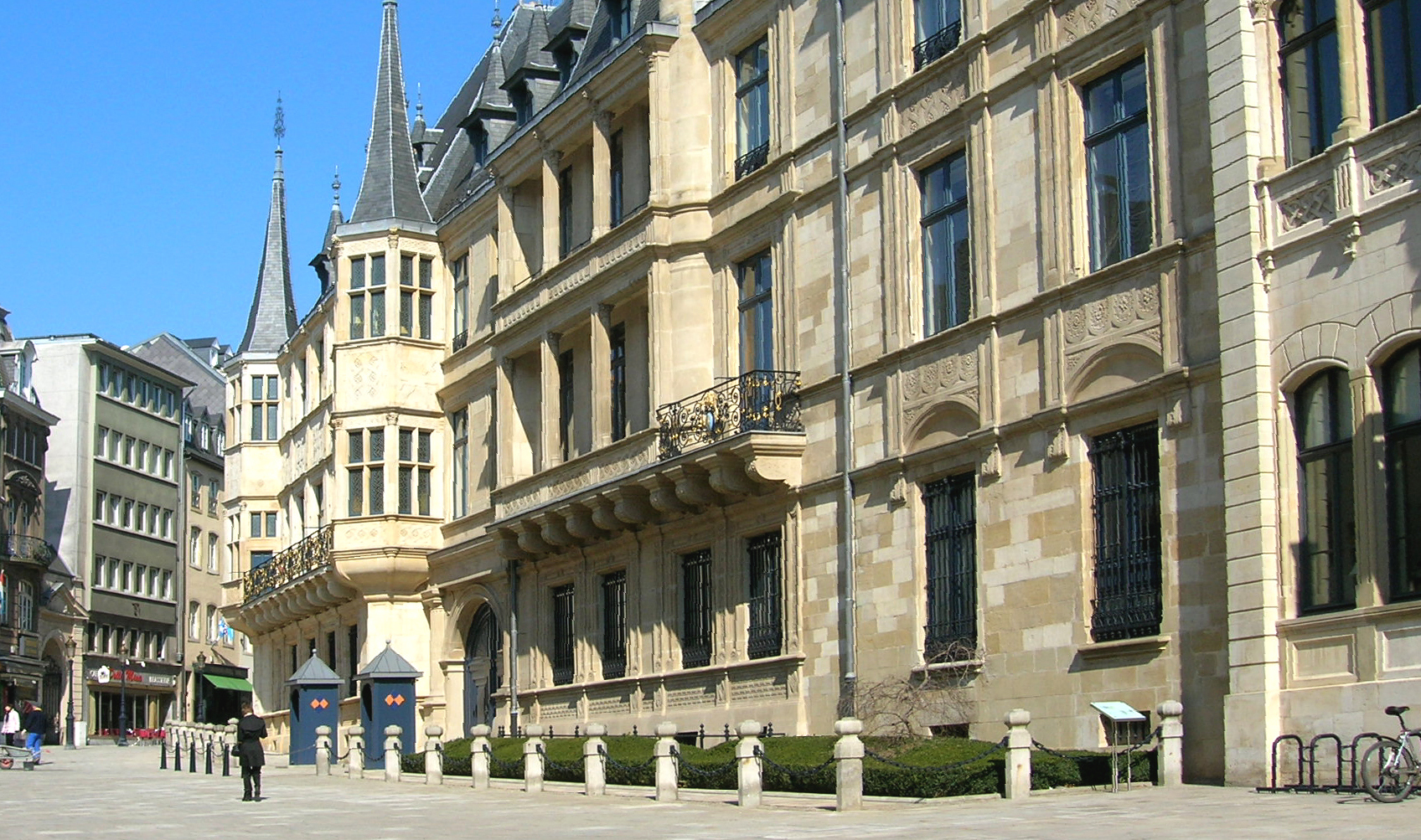
Grand Ducal Palace

- Grand Ducal Palace (Grand Duke, official residence)
- Berg Castle (Grand Duke, principal residence)
- Refuge Saint-Maximin (Prime minister, office)

==== Malta ====
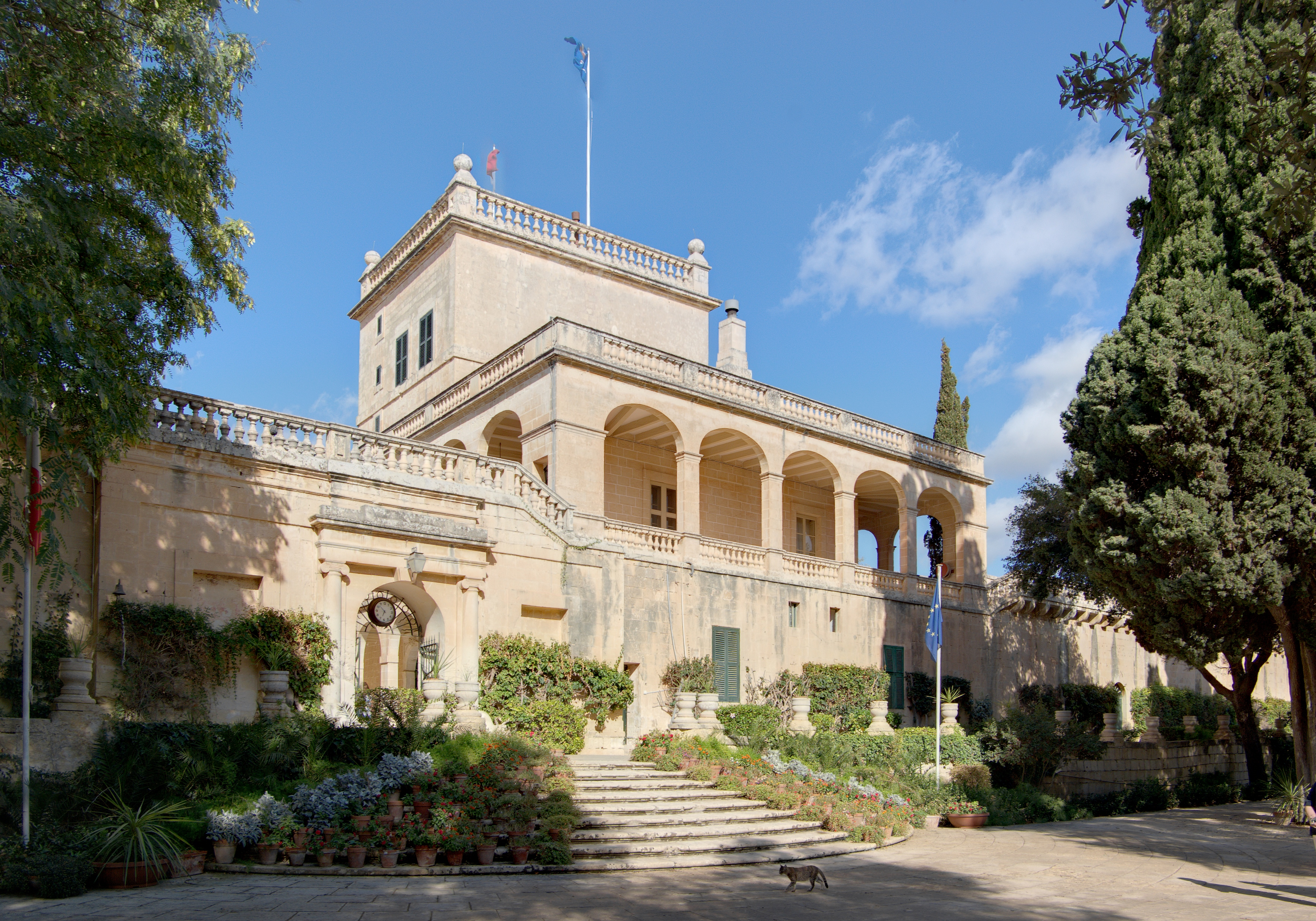
San Anton Palace, Attard

- San Anton Palace (Official Residence of the President)
- Verdala Palace (Summer Residence of the President)
- Villa Francia (Official Residence of the Prime Minister)
- Girgenti Palace (Summer Residence of the Prime Minister)

===== Former =====
- Fort St. Angelo (former residence of the Grand Master, now restored)
- Grandmaster's Palace (former residence of the Grand Master and the Governor, now housing the Office of the President and a museum)
- Palazzo Vilhena (former residence of the Grand Master, now a museum)
- Aħrax Tower (former summer residence of the Governor, now abandoned)
- Casa Leoni (former residence of the Governor, now housing a government ministry)

==== Moldova ====
- Presidential Palace

==== Monaco ====
- Palais Princier de Monaco (Monarch)
- Résidence du ministre d'État (Minister of State)

==== Montenegro ====
- Blue Palace (Official Residence of the President)

==== Netherlands ====
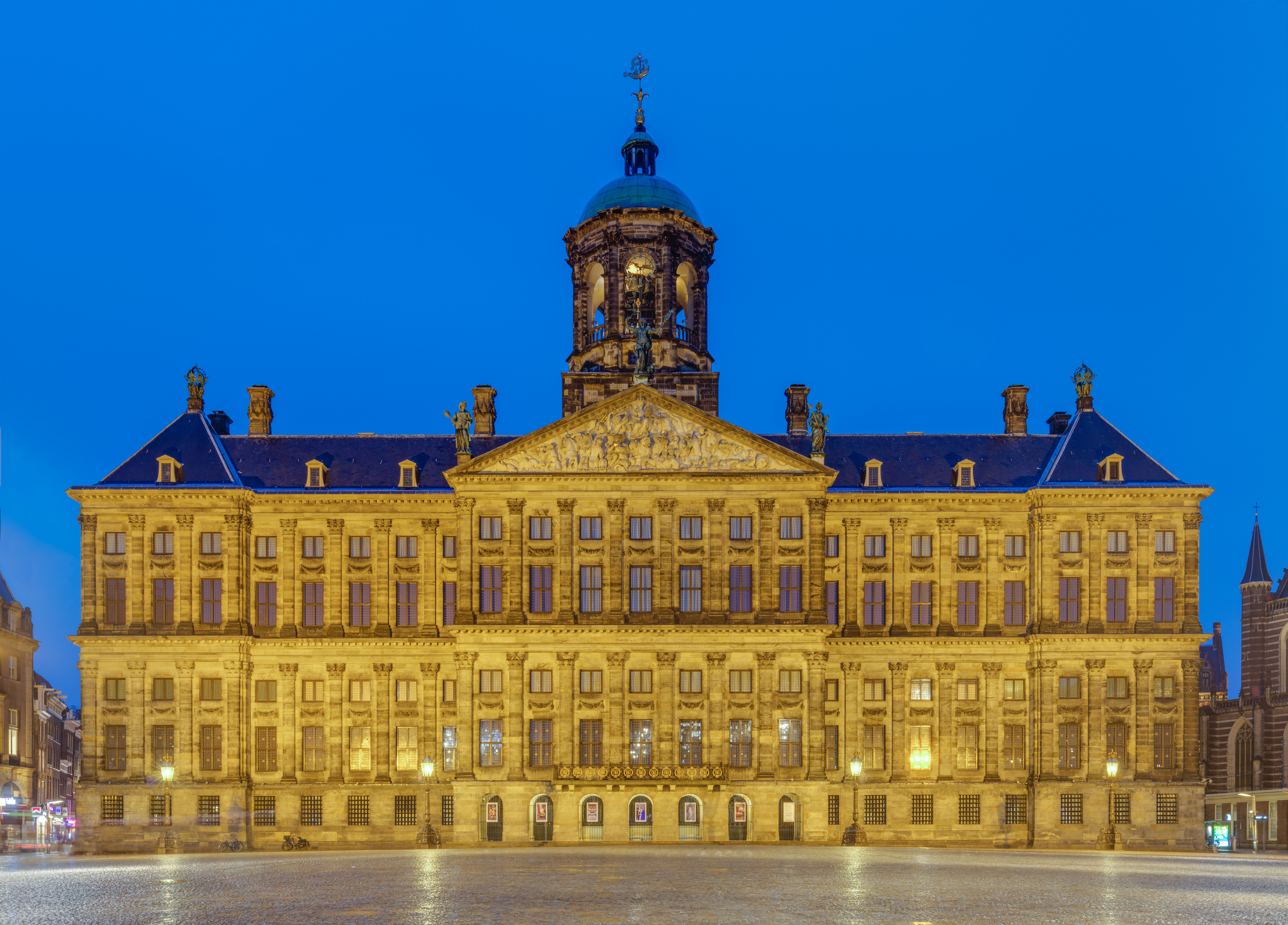
Royal Palace, Amsterdam

- The Royal Palace (official reception palace for foreign dignitaries and used for weddings and the act of abdication)
- Noordeinde Palace (official working palace of the king)
- Palace Huis ten Bosch (official residence of the king)
- Drakensteyn Castle (private residence of Princess Beatrix of the Netherlands, the country's former Queen)
- Het Oude Loo (The castle is currently used by the Dutch royal family as a country house and guest residence.)
- Catshuis (official residence of the prime minister of the Netherlands)

===== Former residence =====
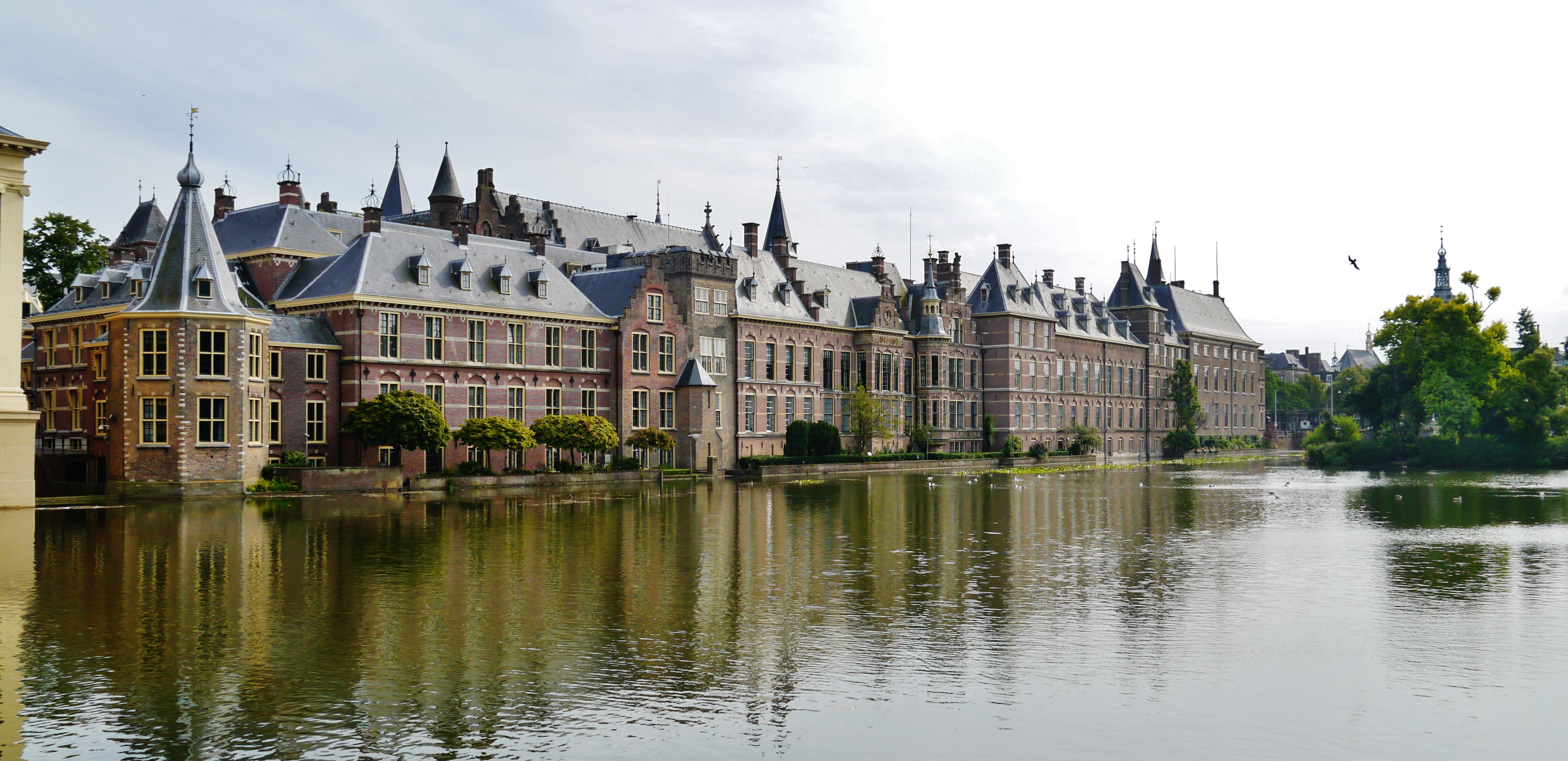
Binnenhof, The Hague

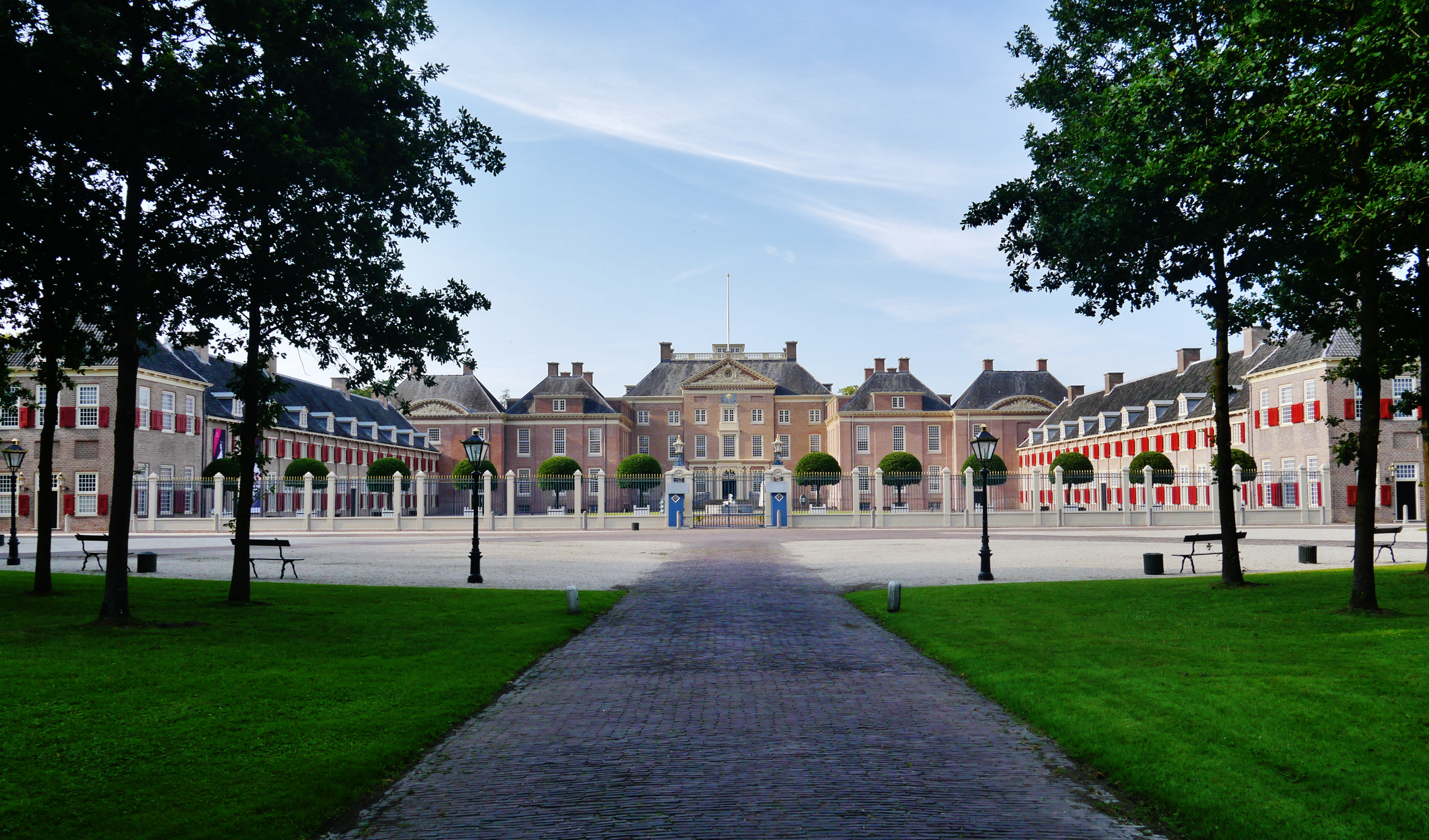
Palace het Loo, Apeldoorn

- Soestdijk Palace (former royal residence of Queen Juliana)
- Het Loo Palace (former royal summer residence of Queen Wilhelmina)
- Anneville (Ulvenhout) (former royal residence of Wilhelmina of the Netherlands)
- Binnenhof (former royal residence of Floris IV, Count of Holland), (currently parlement building)
- Breda Castle (former royal residence of William III of England)
- Bronbeek (former royal residence of William III of the Netherlands)
- City Hall of Tilburg (former royal residence of William II of the Netherlands )
- Huis Doorn (former royal residence of Wilhelm II, German Emperor)
- Kneuterdijk Palace (former royal residence of William II of the Netherlands)
- Koninklijke Schouwburg (former royal residence of William V, Prince of Orange)
- Lange Voorhout Palace (former royal residence)
- Mauritshuis (former royal residence of John Maurice, Prince of Nassau-Siegen)
- Stadhouderlijk Hof (former royal residence of William Louis, Count of Nassau-Dillenburg)

==== North Macedonia ====
- Villa Vodno (Official Presidential workplace)

==== Norway ====
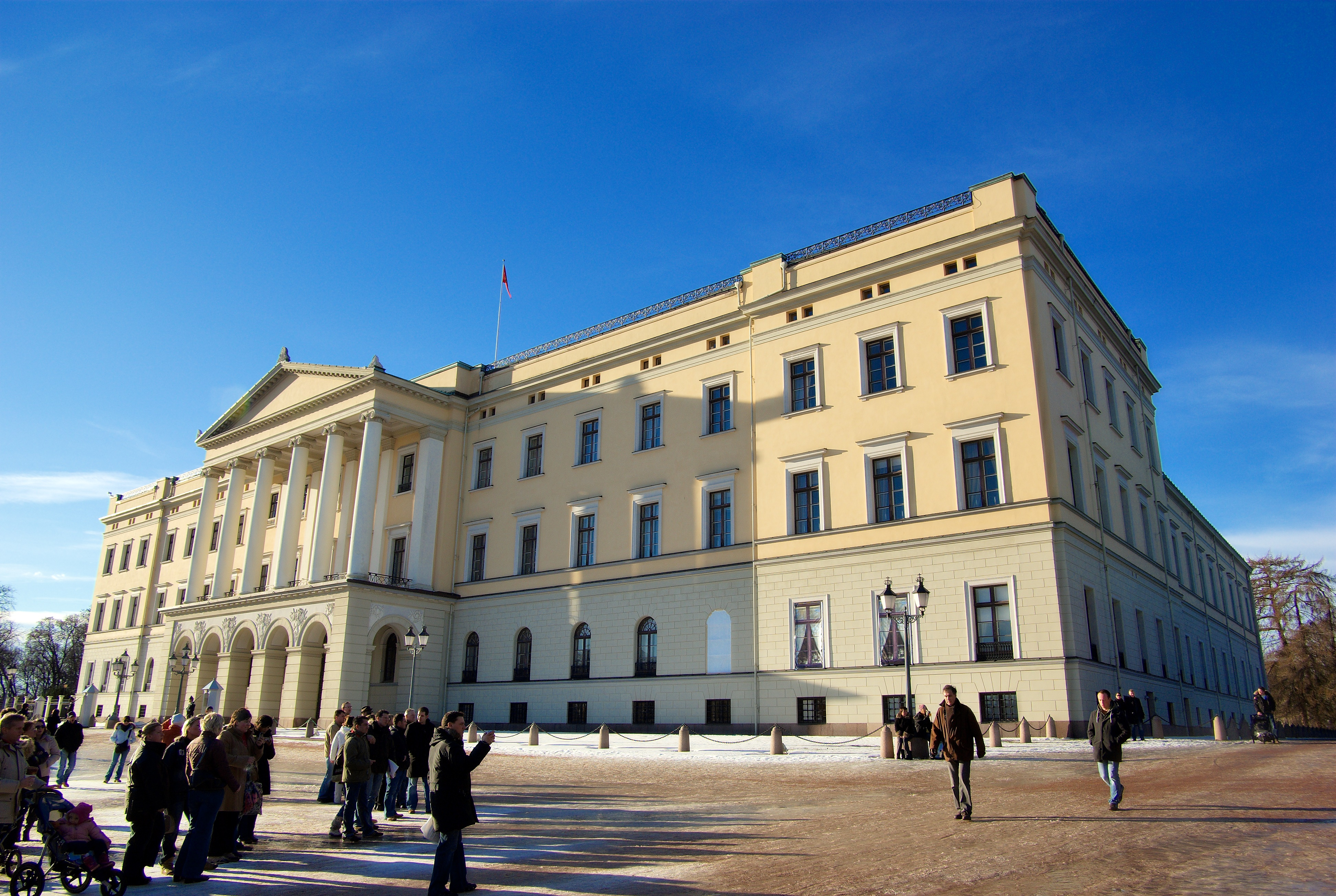
Royal Palace, Oslo

- Royal Palace (Oslo)
- Bygdøy Royal Estate (Monarch, summer retreat)
- Oscarshall Castle
- Akershus Castle
- Gamlehaugen (Monarch, Bergen)
- Ledaal (Monarch, Stavanger)
- Stiftsgården (Monarch, Trondheim)
- Skaugum Estate (Crown Prince)
- Inkognitogata 18 (Prime Minister)
- Riddervolds gate 2 (Visiting foreign dignitaries)

==== Poland ====
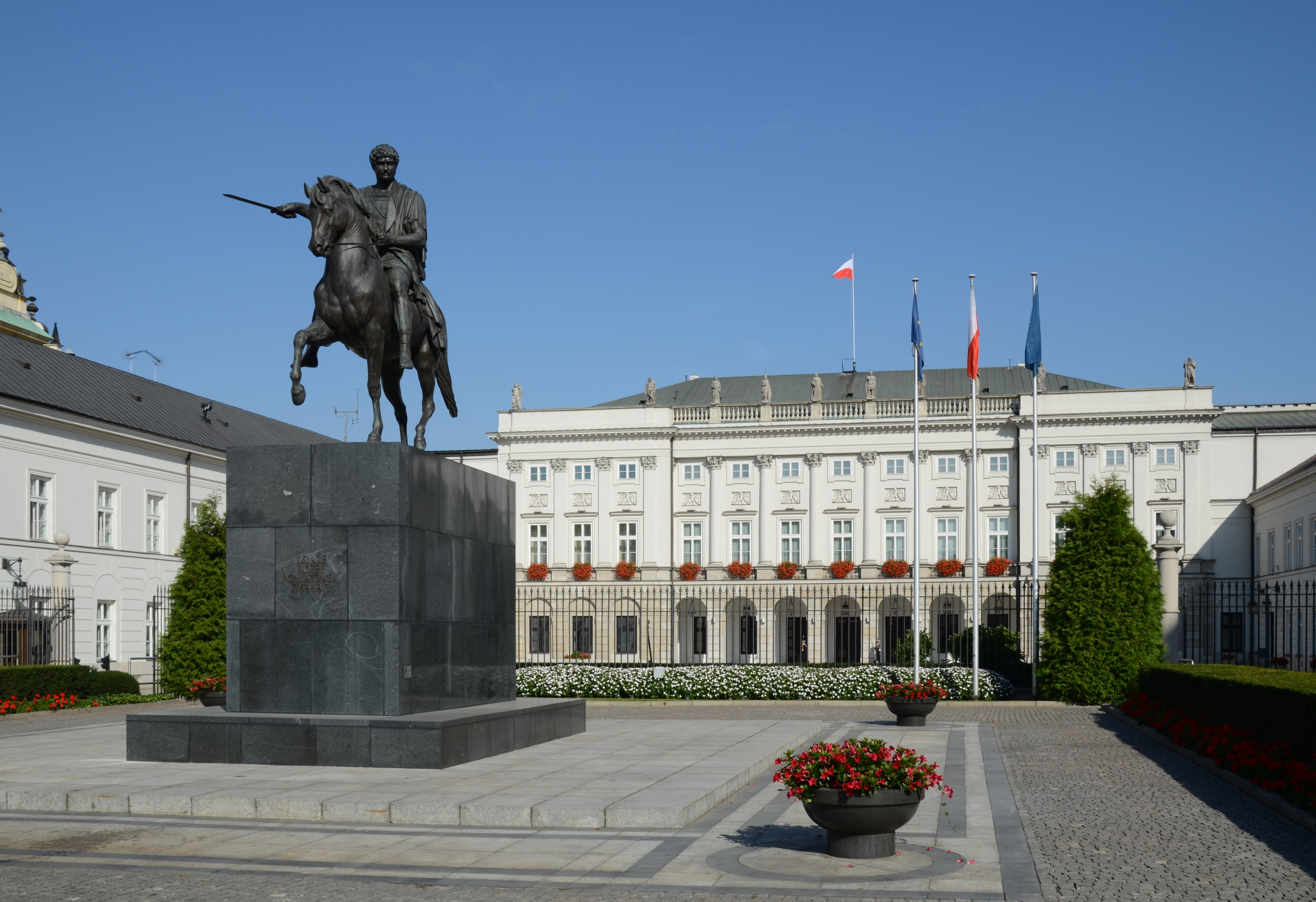
Presidential Palace, Warsaw

- Presidential Palace in Warsaw (President)
- Chancellery of the Prime Minister (Official workplace of Prime Minister)
- Villa Parkowa (Official residence of Prime Minister)
- Belweder in Warsaw (President's residence until 1994; since then kept for official government functions and visiting foreign dignitaries)
- Presidential Castle in Wisła
- Presidential Manor House in Ciechocinek
- Presidential Residence in Hel
- Presidential Residence in Lucień
- Presidential Residence in Ruda Tarnowska
- Presidential Villa in Klarysew part of Konstancin-Jeziorna

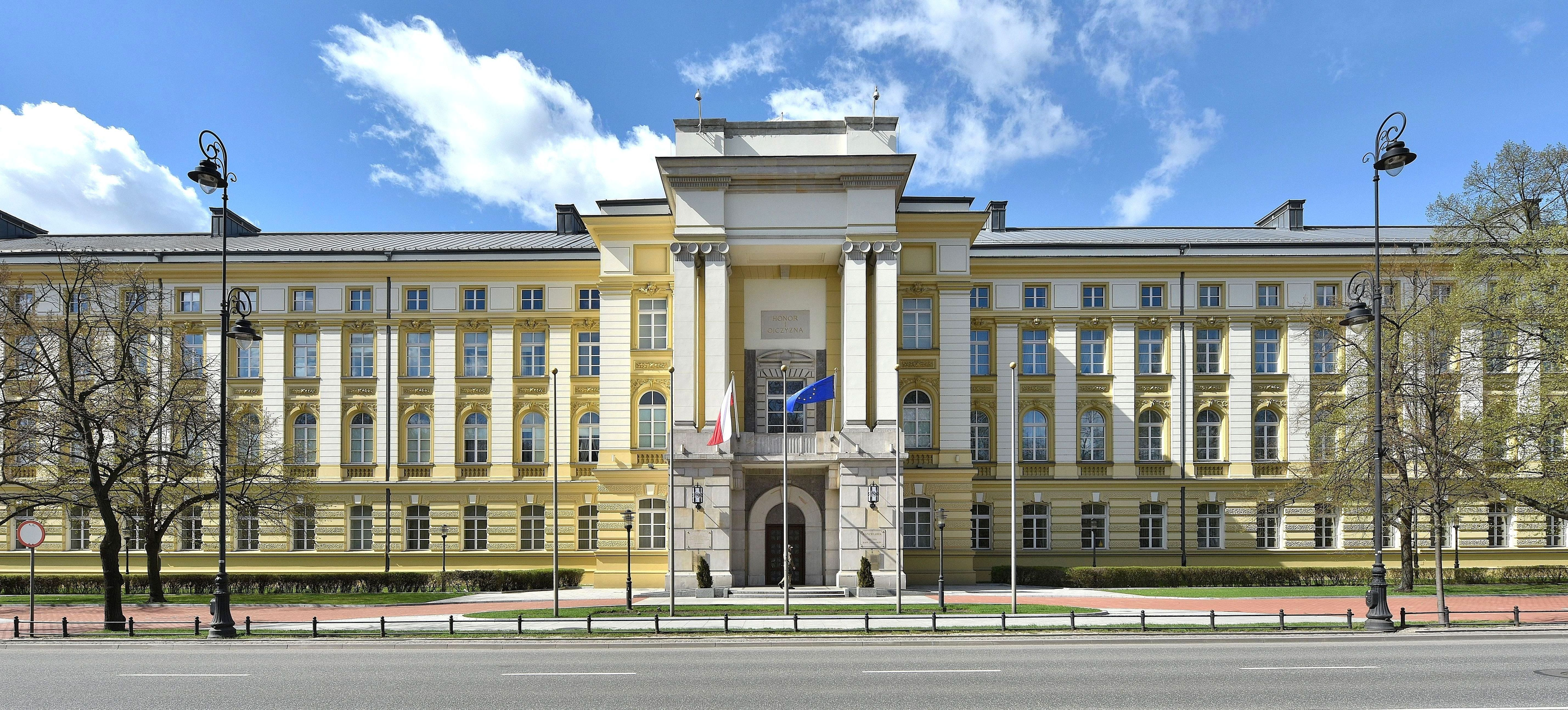
Building of the Chancellery of the Prime Minister (Poland) in Warsaw

===== Former =====
- Wawel Castle
- Royal Castle (King, formerly; now museum)
- Wilanów Palace
- Palace on the Isle
- Sanok Castle
- Zhovkva Castle
- Malbork Castle
- Brzeg Castle
- Ujazdów Castle
- Piotrków Trybunalski Castle
- Niepołomice Castle
- Palace of the Grand Dukes of Lithuania
- Saxon Palace
- Tykocin Castle

==== Portugal ====
Belém National Palace, Lisbon.

Queluz National Palace, Queluz.

- Belém Palace (President of the Republic)
  - Palace of the Dukes of Braganza (President of the Republic, official residence in the North Region)
  - Citadel of Cascais (President of the Republic, official summer residence)
- São Bento Mansion (Prime Minister)
- Palace of Necessidades (Ministry of Foreign Affairs)
- Fort of São Julião da Barra (Minister of National Defence)
- Palace of São Lourenço (Representative of the Republic in Madeira)
- Madre de Deus Manor (Representative of the Republic in the Azores)
- Queluz Palace (state guest house)

===== Former =====
- Ajuda Royal Palace (official royal residence)
- Alcáçova Palace at São Jorge Castle (official royal residence)
- Alcáçova Palace at Coimbra (official royal residence)
- Évora Royal Palace (official royal residence)
- Royal Building of Mafra (Palace and Basilica) (official royal residence)
- Necessidades Royal Palace (official royal residence)
- Ribeira Royal Palace (official royal residence)
- Queluz Royal Palace (summer residence turned official royal residence)
- Sintra Royal Palace (summer residence turned official royal residence)

==== Romania ====
- Vila Lac 3 (residence of the President)
- Cotroceni Palace (office of the President)
- Victoria Palace (office of the Prime Minister)
- Elisabeta Palace (official residence of HM Margareta of Romania)
- Săvârșin Castle (residence of HM Margareta of Romania)

==== Russia ====
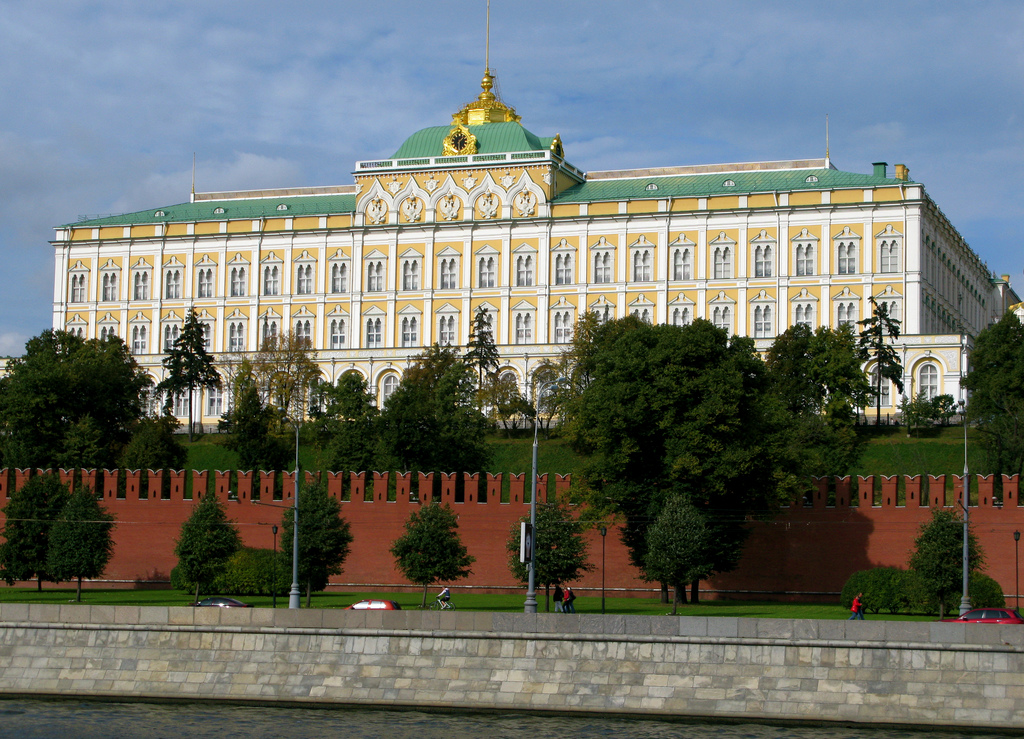
Grand Kremlin Palace

- Kremlin (President)
- Constantine Palace
- Novo-Ogaryovo
- Valdai
- Zavidovo
- White House (Prime Minister)

===== Former =====
- Alexander Palace (Tsar, formerly; kept as museum)
- Anichkov Palace (Tsar, formerly; kept as Pioneers Palace)
- Catherine Palace (Tsar, summer retreat, formerly; kept as museum)
- Nicholas Palace (Tsar, formerly; kept as commercial offices)
- Oraniembaum (Tsar, formerly; kept as museum)
- Pavlovsk (Tsar, formerly; kept as museum)
- Pella Palace (Tsar, summer retreat, formerly; demolished)
- Peterhof Palace (Tsar, formerly; kept as museum)
- Summer Palace (Tsar, summer retreat, formerly; demolished)
- Tauride Palace (Tsar, formerly; kept as offices for Interparliamentary Assembly of Member Nations of the Commonwealth of Independent States)
- Vladimir Palace (Tsar, formerly; kept as Academics' House)
- Winter Palace (Tsar, winter retreat, formerly; kept as museum)
- Yelagin Palace (Tsar, summer retreat, formerly; kept as museum)
- Kuntsevo Dacha (Summer residence of Joseph Stalin)
- Stalin's Dacha in Sochi (Summer residence of Joseph Stalin)
- Bocharov Ruchey (President; demolished)

===== Republics =====
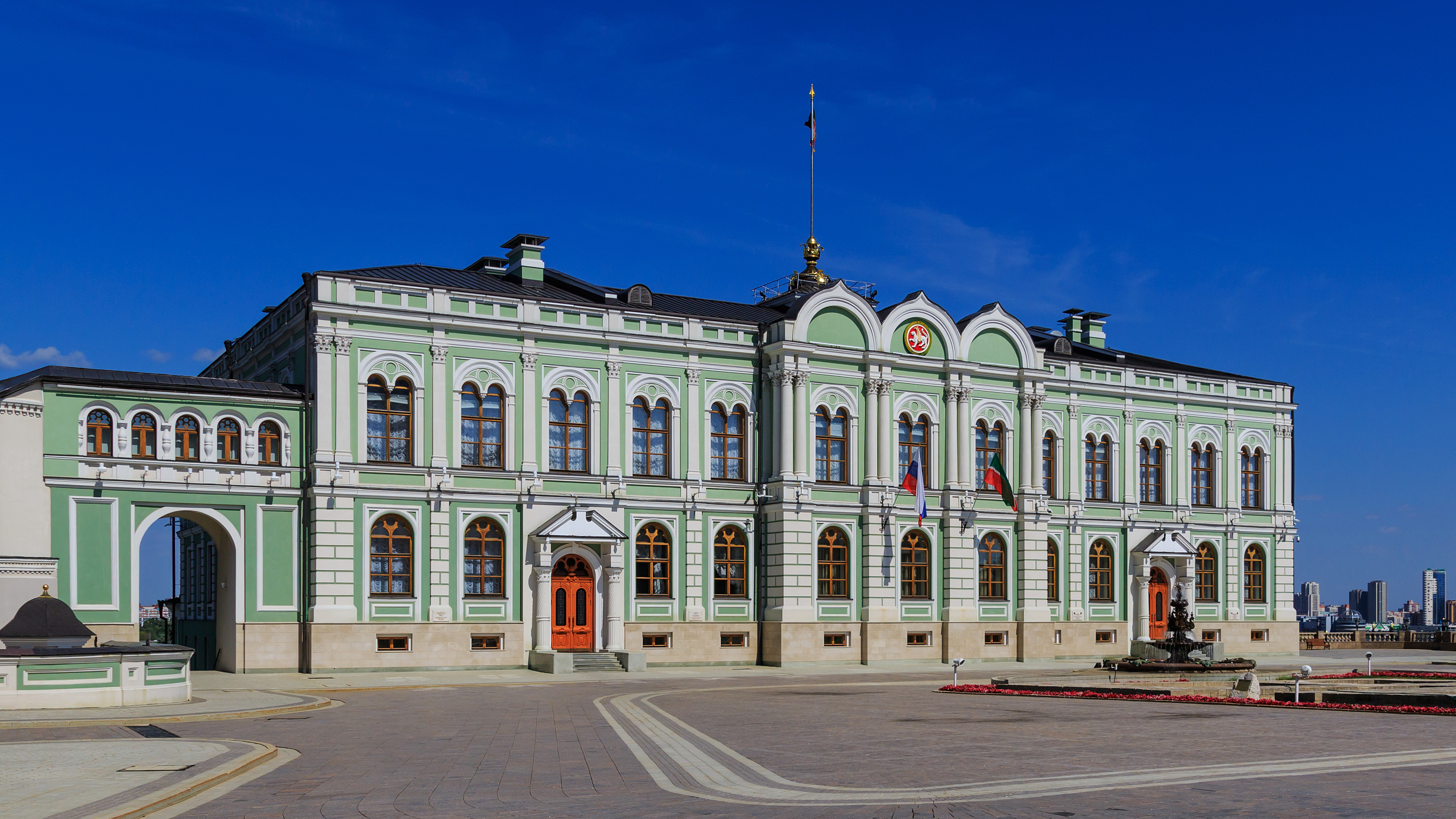
Kazan Kremlin

- Adygea:
  Building of the Administration of the Republic Of Adygea, Maykop (Head)
- Bashkortostan:
  Republic House (Head)
- Buryatia:
  54 Ulitsa Lenina, Ulan-Ude (Head)
- Chechnya:
  Residence of the Head of the Chechen Republic, Grozny (Head)
- Chuvashia:
  Government House, Cheboksary (Head)
- Dagestan:
  White House, Makhachkala (Head)
- Ingushetia:
  14 Prospekt I. Zyazikova, Magas (Head)
- Karachay-Cherkessia:
  Government House, Cherkessk (Head)
- Republic of Karelia:
  19 Prospekt Lenina, Petrozavodsk (Head)
- Khakassia:
  Residence of the Head of the Republic of Khakassia, Abakan (Head)
- Komi Republic:
  9 Ulitsa Kommunisticheskaya, Syktyvkar (Head)
- Mordovia:
  Dom Respubliki, Saransk (Head)
- Sakha:
  11 Ulitsa Kirova, Yakutsk (Head)
- Tatarstan:
  Kazan Kremlin (President)
- Udmurtia:
  Palace of the Head of the Udmurt Republic, Izhevsk (Head)

===== Krais =====
- Krasnodar Krai:
  35 Ulitsa Krasnaya, Krasnodar (Governor)

==== Serbia ====
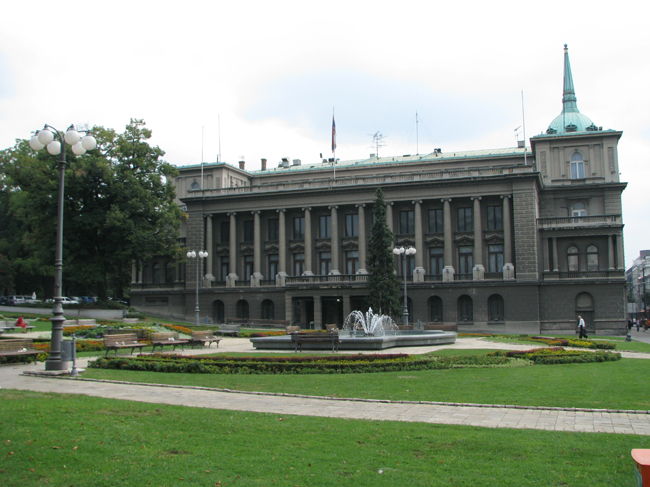
Novi Dvor

- Novi Dvor (President's office)
- Villa Mir (President's residence)
- Villa Bokeljka (President's residence)
- Government Building (Prime Minister's office)
- Villa Bor (Prime Minister's residence)

===== Former =====
- Stari Dvor (formerly royal residence; currently Belgrade City Hall)
- Kraljevski Dvor (formerly royal residence; currently residence of Crown Prince-pretender to the throne)
- Beli Dvor (formerly royal residence; currently residence of Crown Prince-pretender to the throne)

==== Slovakia ====
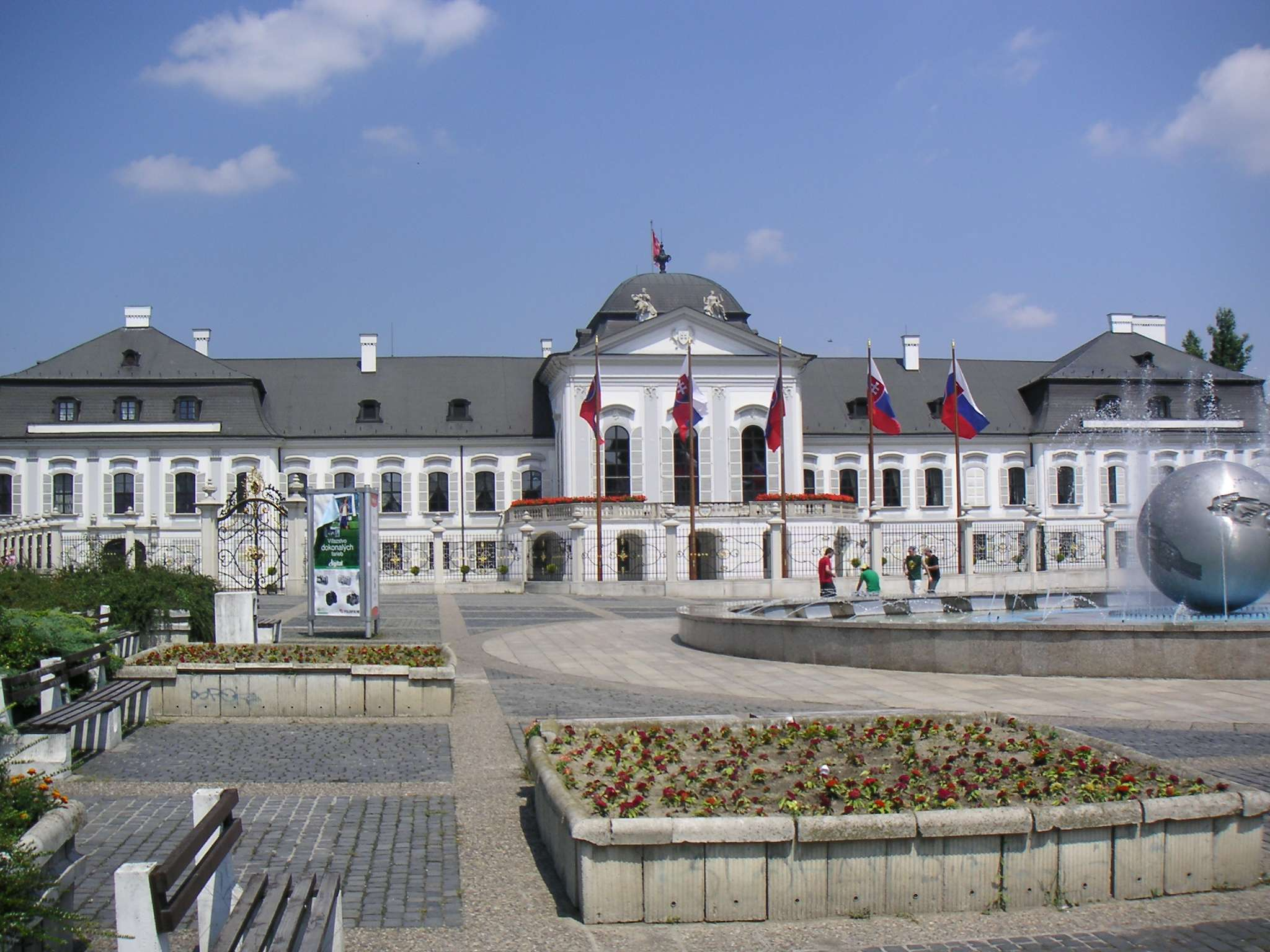
Grassalkovich Palace

- Grassalkovich Palace (President)

==== Slovenia ====
- Government and Presidential Palace, Ljubljana (only used for work purposes)

==== Spain ====
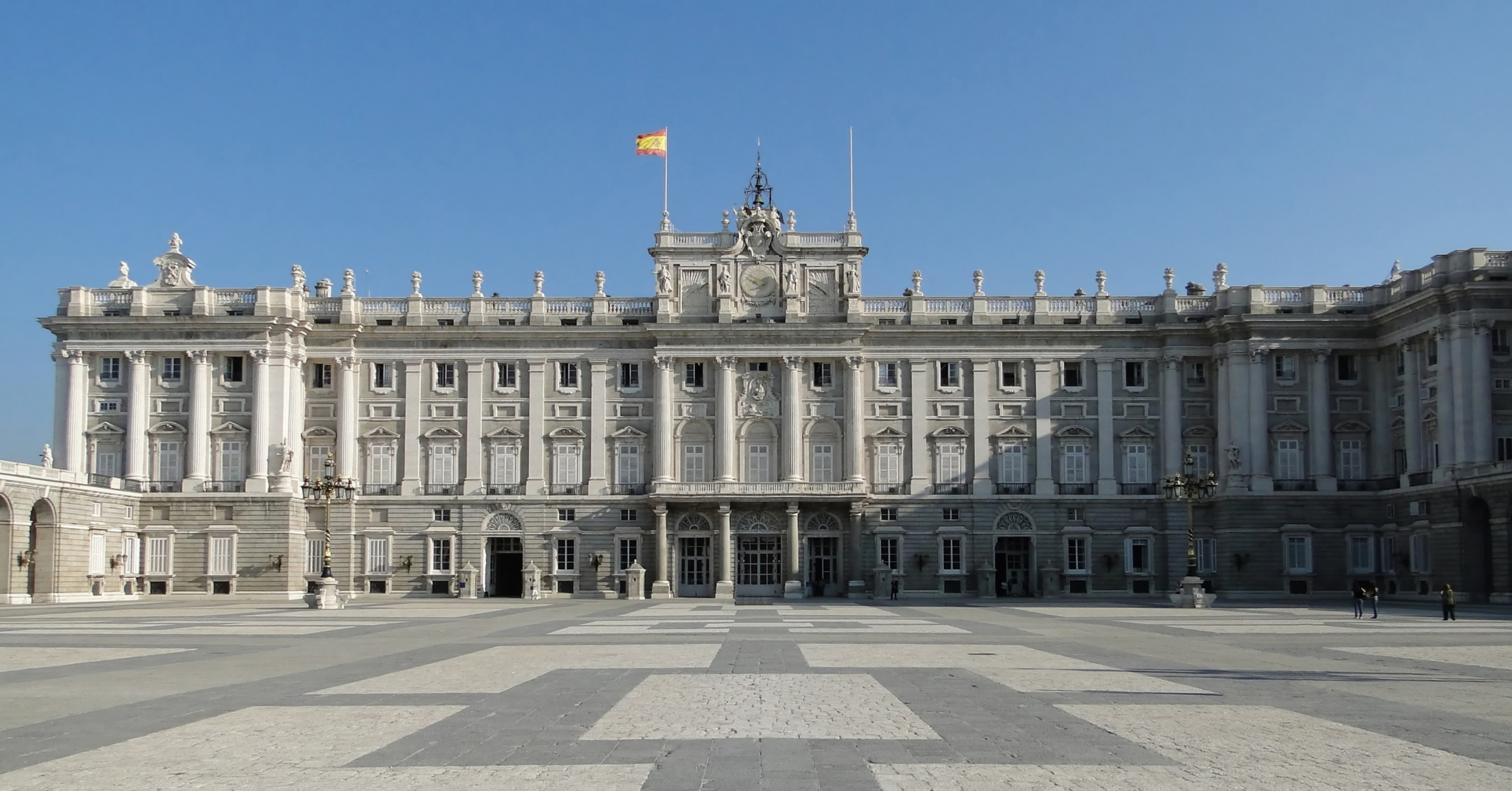
Royal Palace of Madrid, the official residence of the king of Spain.

===== Royal family =====
- Royal Palace of Madrid (Official residence of Spanish monarchs, but used only for state ceremonies. In Madrid's city center)
- Palace of Zarzuela (De facto residence and working place of the monarch. Headquarts of the Royal Household. A few kilometers outside of Madrid's city center)
- Palace of Marivent (Summer retreat of the monarch. In Mallorca, Balearic Islands)
- Alcázar of Seville (official residence of the monarch in Seville, Andalusia)
- Palace of Albéniz (official residence of the monarch in Barcelona, Catalonia)
- Royal Residence of La Mareta (royal family's holiday residence in Teguise, Canary Islands. Also used by the prime minister).

===== Prime ministerial and other government residences =====
- Palace of Moncloa (Official residence and working place of the Spanish prime minister)
- Palace of the Marismillas (holiday residence of the prime minister, in Almonte, Andalusia)
- Quintos de Mora Estate (holiday residence of the prime minister, in Los Yébenes, Castilla–La Mancha)
- Palace of Viana (Official residence of the Minister of Foreign Affairs, in Madrid)

===== Regional =====
- Aragon:
  Edificio Pignatelli (President of DGA)
- Andalusia:
  Palacio de San Telmo (President of the Junta)
- Basque Country:
  Ajuria Enea (Lehendakari)
- Catalonia:
  Casa dels Canonges (President of the Generalitat)
- Galicia:
  Monte Pío (President of the Xunta)
- Castile and Leon:
  Colegio de la Asunción (President of the Junta)

==== Sweden ====
===== Swedish royal family =====
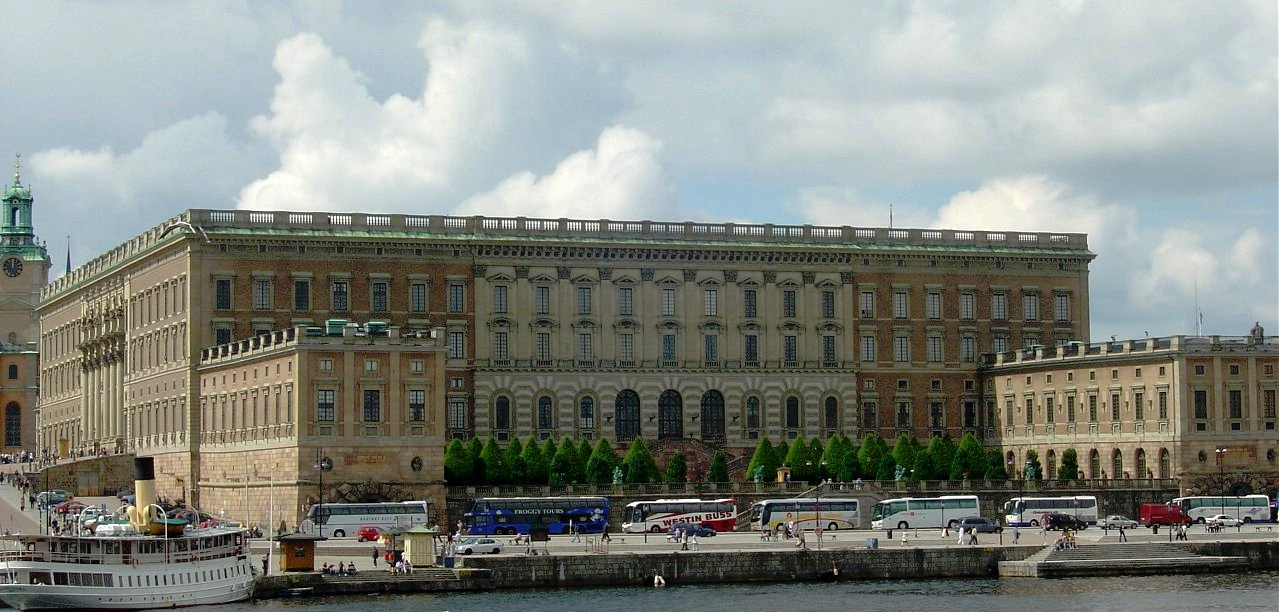
The Royal Palace in Stockholm

Drottningholm Palace

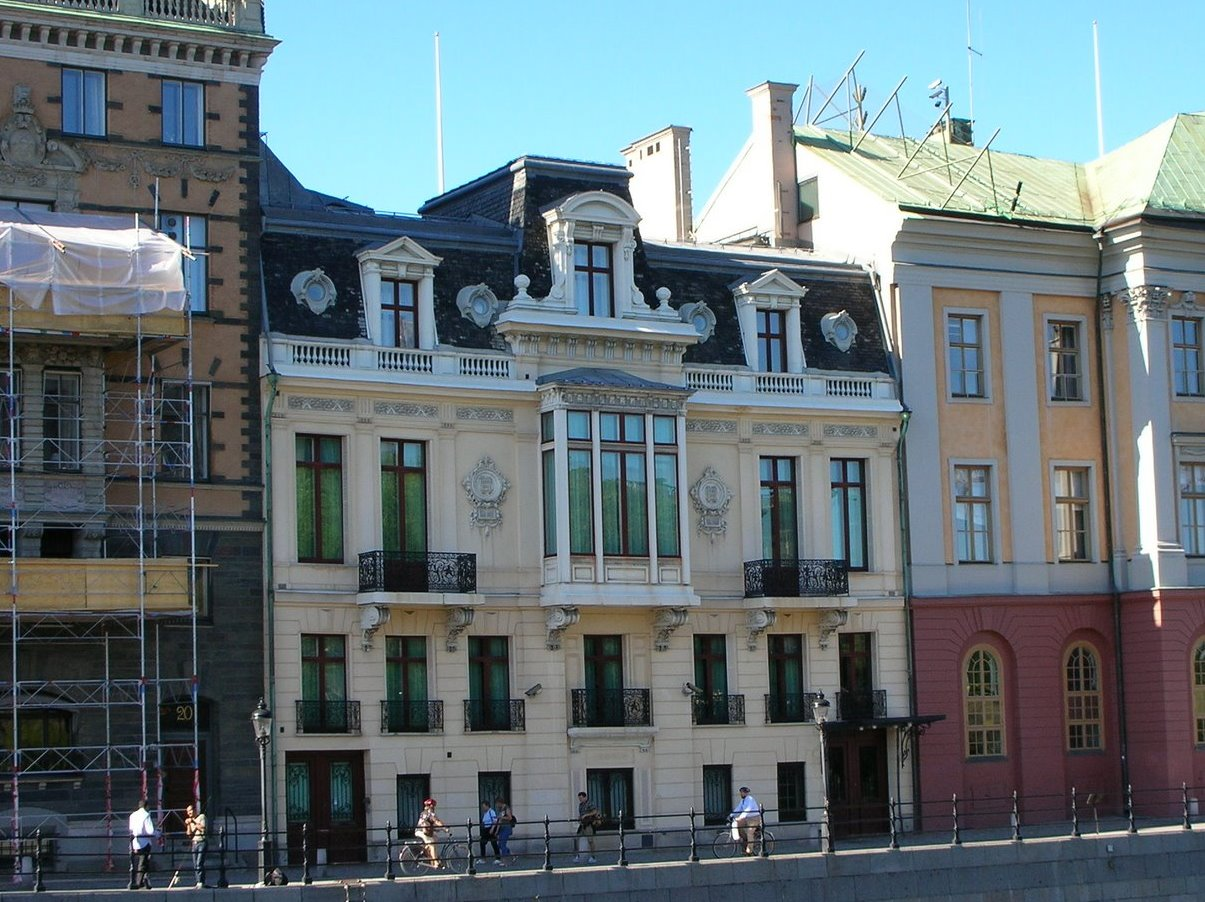
Sager Palace (Prime Minister of Sweden)

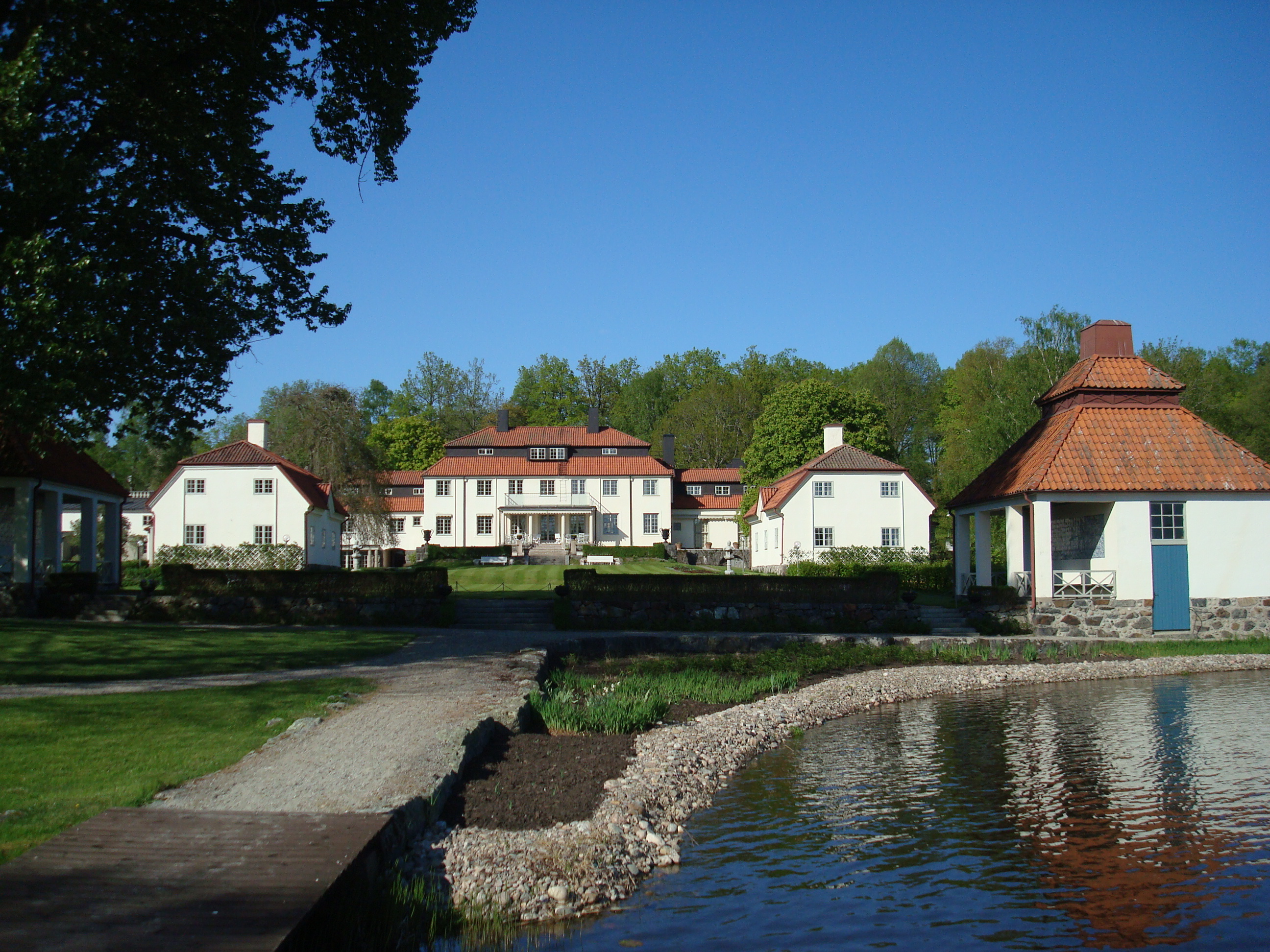
Harpsund

- Royal Palace in Stockholm (official residence since 1754, but not used as such since 1981)
- Drottningholm Palace (everyday residence of TM The King and Queen since 1981)
- Haga Palace (Official residence of TRH The Crown Princess and Prince Daniel, Duke of Västergötland. Palaces owned by the State, at the disposal of the King, but not in use)
- Gripsholm Castle
- Rosendal Palace
- Rosersberg Palace
- Stenhammar Palace
- Strömsholm Palace
- Tullgarn Palace
- Ulriksdal Palace

====== Former royal residences ======
- Arvfurstens palats
- Kalmar Castle
- Karlberg Palace
- Nyköping Castle
- Uppsala Castle
- Vadstena Castle
- Wrangel Palace (Official residence 1697–1754)

===== Prime Ministerial =====
- Sager House (Official residence of the Prime Minister)
- Harpsund (Country retreat for the Prime Minister)

===== Gubernatorial =====
- Gävleborg County
  Gävle Castle (governor)
- Halland County
  Halmstad Castle (governor)
- Jönköping County
  The Residence, Jönköping (governor)
- Skåne County
  The Residence, Malmö (governor)
- Stockholm County
  Tessin Palace (governor)
- Uppsala County
  Uppsala Castle (governor)
- Västmanland County
  Västerås Castle (governor)
- Västra Götaland County
  The Residence, Gothenburg (governor)
- Örebro County
  Örebro Castle (governor)
- Östergötland County
  Linköping Castle (governor)

==== Switzerland ====
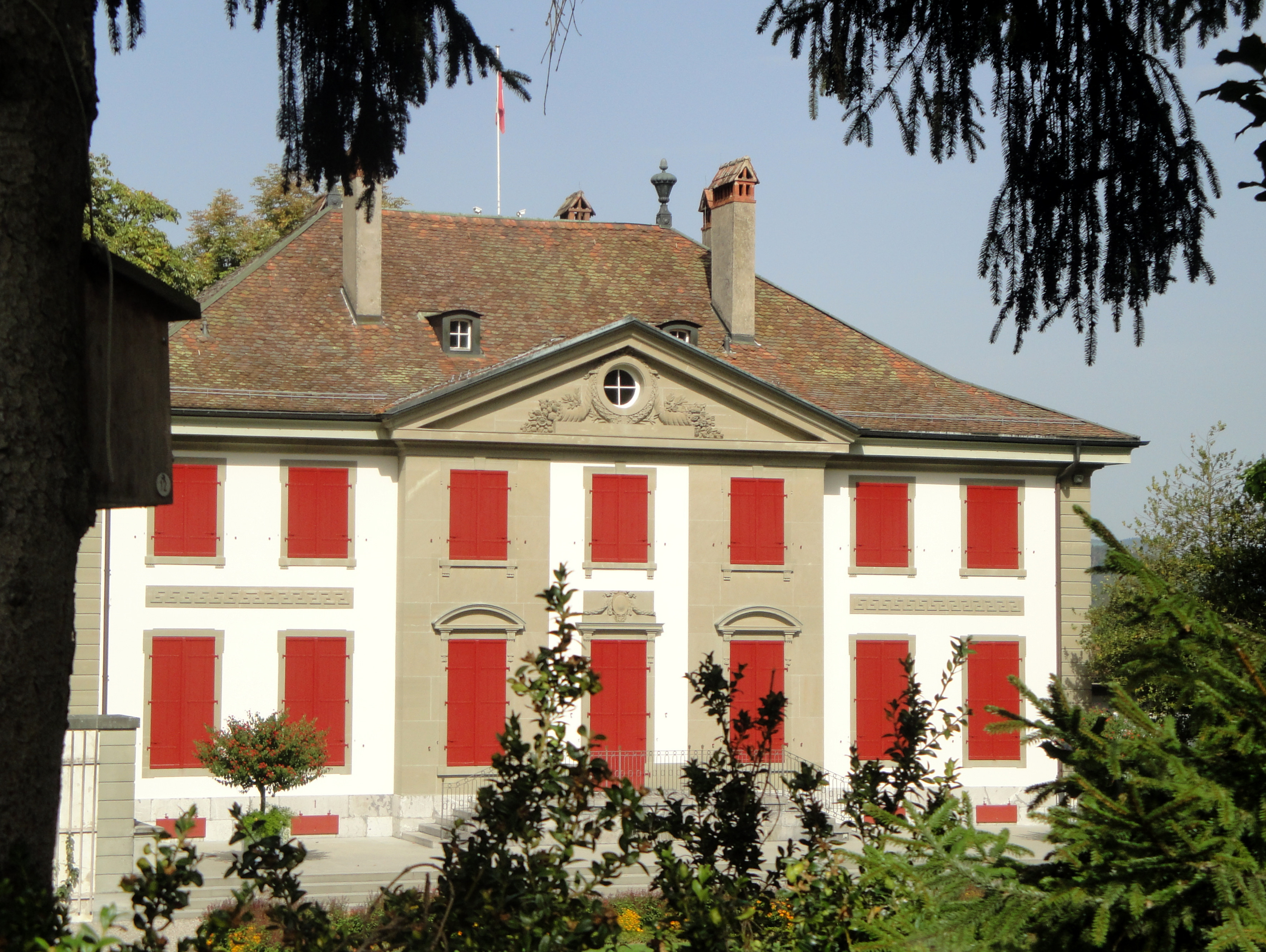
Lohn Estate

Official estates of the Swiss Federal Council:

- Lohn Estate
- Béatrice-von-Wattenwyl-Haus

==== Ukraine ====
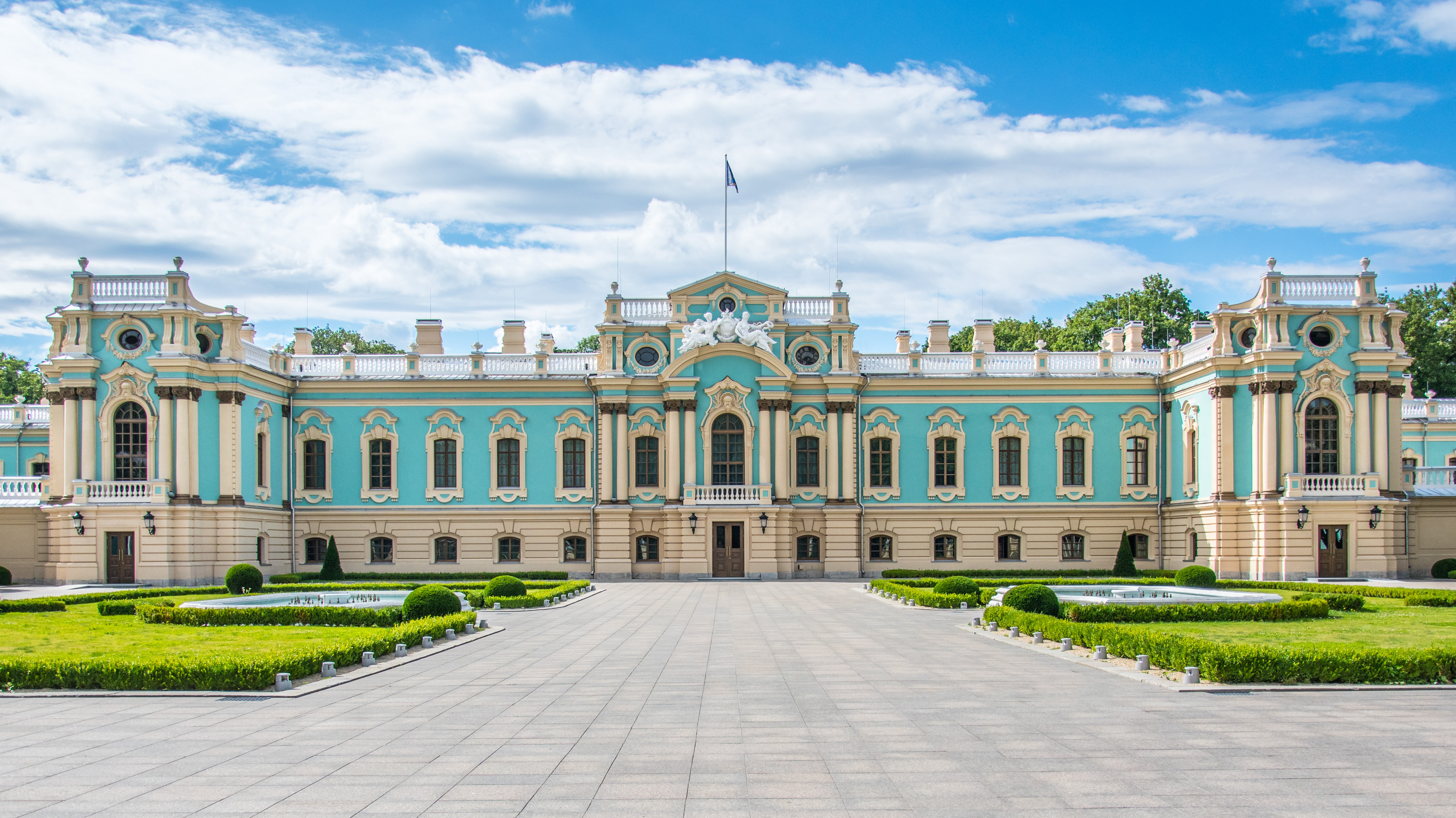
Mariinskyi Palace, Kyiv

- Mariinskyi Palace (President)
- House with Chimaeras (President)
- House of the Weeping Widow (President)
- Pototsky Palace (President)

==== United Kingdom ====
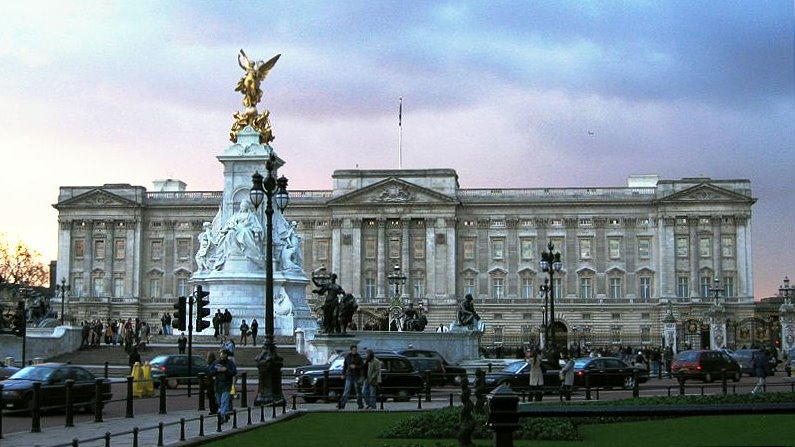
Buckingham Palace, London

- Buckingham Palace (official working palace of the King)
- Windsor Castle (official country residence of the King)
- Hillsborough Castle (official residence of the King in Northern Ireland when in the province, otherwise, the official residence of the Secretary of State for Northern Ireland)
- Clarence House (official London residence of the King and Queen while renovations to Buckingham Palace are ongoing; previously official residence of Queen Elizabeth the Queen Mother)
- Kensington Palace (London residence of the Duke and Duchess of Gloucester, the Duke and Duchess of Kent, the Prince and Princess of Wales and their family)
- St James's Palace (seat of the Royal Court and senior Palace of the Sovereign, London residence of the Princess Royal and Sir Timothy Laurence, the Duke and Duchess of Edinburgh, Princess Alexandra, and Princess Beatrice and Edoardo Mapelli Mozzi)
- 10 Downing Street (official residence of the Prime Minister, in their capacity as First Lord of the Treasury)
- 11 Downing Street (official residence of the Chancellor of the Exchequer, in their capacity as Second Lord of the Treasury)
- 12 Downing Street (official residence of the Government Chief Whip but currently houses the Offices of the Prime Minister)
- Chequers (Country residence of the Prime Minister)
- Carlton Gardens, St. James's (No. 1 is the official residence of the Foreign Secretary and No. 2 houses the Privy Council Office)
- Admiralty House (three ministerial flats for use by Ministers of the Crown)
- Chevening House (country residence of a Minister of the Crown nominated by the Prime Minister, which is by custom given to the Foreign Secretary)
- Dorneywood (country residence of a Minister of the Crown nominated by the Prime Minister, which is by custom given to the Chancellor of the Exchequer)
- Palace of Westminster (Official residence of the monarch, but the royal apartments are generally unused by the monarch except as a place to change clothes and don the regalia of state for state openings of parliament. Includes grand state apartments for the Lord Speaker of the House of Lords, Speaker of the House of Commons, and the Lord Chancellor)

===== Former =====
- Bridewell Palace (King, formerly; demolished)
- Carlton House, London (Prince, formerly; demolished)
- Cumberland House (Prince, formerly; demolished)
- Edinburgh Castle (King, formerly; kept as museum, barracks, vault, and venue for state receptions)
- Eltham Palace (King, formerly; Great Hall kept as museum)
- Falkland Palace (King, formerly; kept as museum)
- Hampton Court Palace (King, formerly; kept as museum)
- Kew Palace (Queen, formerly; kept as museum)
- Linlithgow Palace (King, formerly; damaged in fire (1746), kept as museum)
- Marlborough House (Queen, formerly; kept for headquarters for Commonwealth Secretariat)
- Castle of Mey (Residence of Queen Elizabeth the Queen Mother, now a museum)
- Nonsuch Palace (King, formerly; demolished)
- Osborne House (Queen, formerly; kept as museum)
- Palace of Placentia (King, formerly; demolished)
- Queen's House (Queen, formerly; kept as museum)
- Richmond Palace (King, formerly; demolished)
- Tower of London (King, formerly; kept as museum, barracks and vault)
- Palace of Whitehall (King; destroyed in fire)
- Cathays Park (The Welsh Secretary had an official flat here prior to devolution)
- Cabin Hill (former residence of the Prime Minister of Northern Ireland, later converted into a school)
- Stormont Castle (former residence of the Prime Minister of Northern Ireland)
- Stormont House (former residence of the Speaker of the House of Commons of Northern Ireland)

===== City of London =====
- Mansion House (official residence of the Lord Mayor of London)

===== Religious =====
- Lambeth Palace (official London residence of the Archbishop of Canterbury)
- Old Palace, Canterbury (official residence of the Archbishop of Canterbury in Canterbury)
- Bishopthorpe Palace (official residence of the Archbishop of York)
- Number 2 Rothesay Terrace (official residence of the Moderator of the General Assembly of the Church of Scotland)

===== Territorial =====
- Anguilla: Government House (official residence of the governor)
- Bermuda: Government House (official residence of the governor)
- British Virgin Islands: Government House (official residence of the governor)
- Cayman Islands: Government House (official residence of the governor)
- Falkland Islands: Government House (official residence of the governor)
- Gibraltar: The Convent (official residence of the governor) 6 Convent Place (official residence of the chief minister)
- Guernsey: Government House (official residence of the lieutenant governor)
- Jersey: Government House (official residence of the lieutenant governor)
- Isle of Man: Government House (official residence of the lieutenant governor)
- Montserrat: Government House (official residence of the governor)
- Pitcairn Islands: Government House (official residence of the governor)
- Saint Helena: Plantation House (official residence of the governor) The Castle (former official residence of the governor, now used as the governor's office)
- Turks and Caicos Islands: Government House (official residence of the governor)

===== Scotland =====
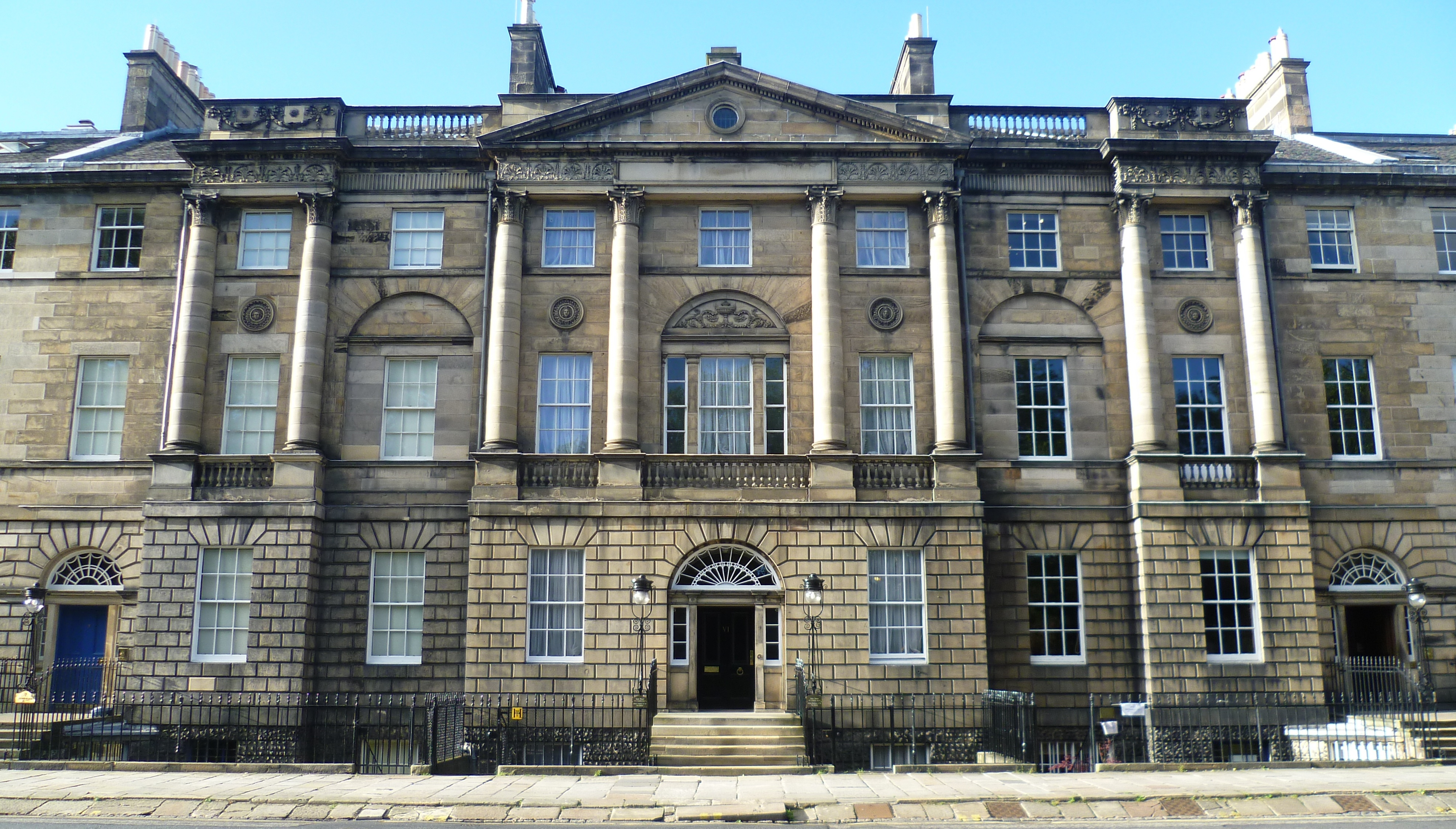
Bute House, official residence of the first minister of Scotland

- Palace of Holyroodhouse (official residence of the King in Scotland)
- Bute House (Official residence of the First Minister of Scotland)
- Stirling Castle (appertaining to the King of Scotland, latterly by the Acts of Union 1707 and 1800, King of the United Kingdom of Great Britain and Northern Ireland)
- Tulliallan Castle (Official residence of the Chief Constable of the Police Service of Scotland)

==== Vatican City ====
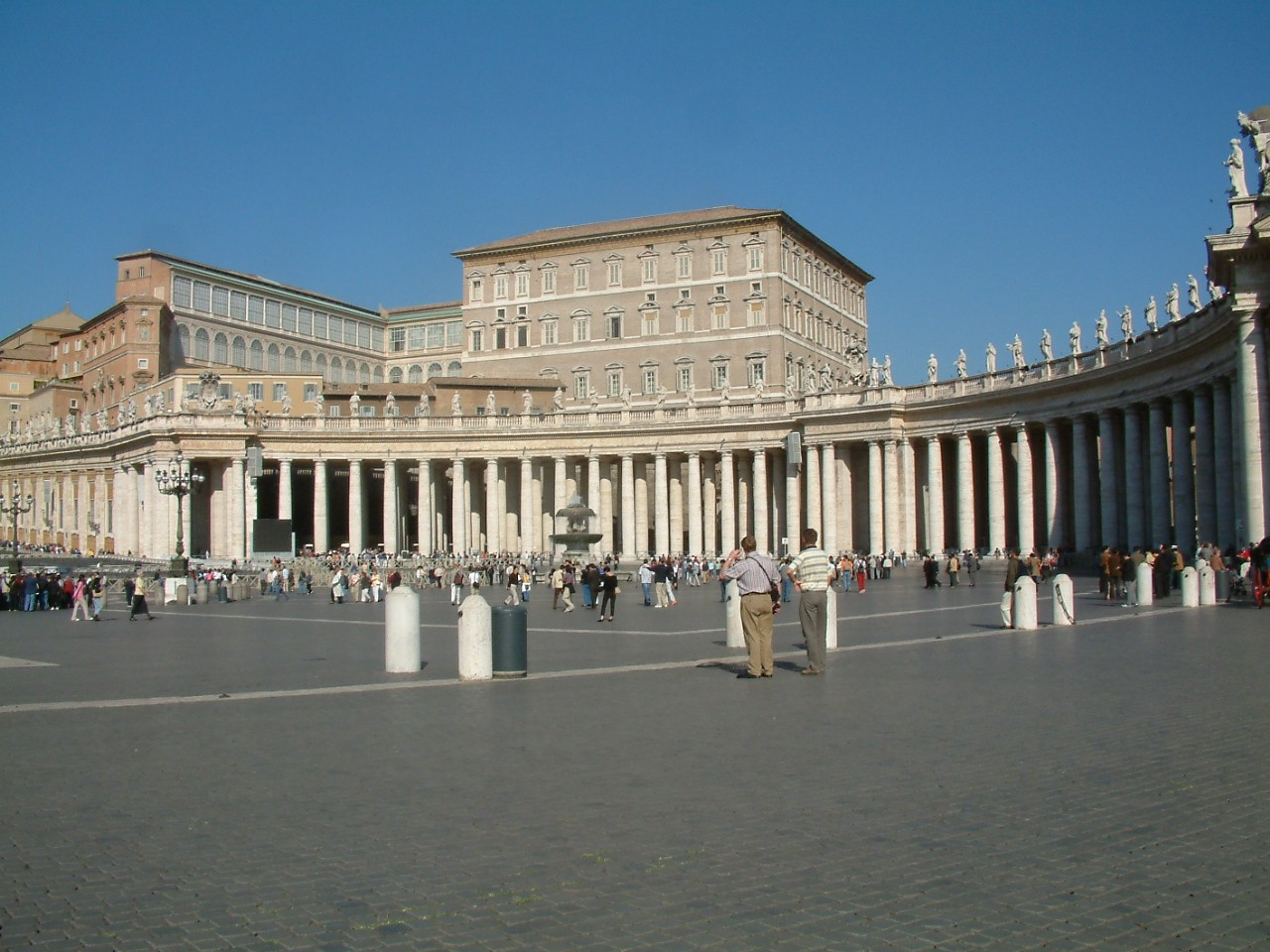
Apostolic Palace, Vatican

- Apostolic Palace (Pope)
- Castel Gandolfo (Pope summer residence; now partly open to the public as a museum and garden)
- Domus Sanctae Marthae (Guest House of Vatican City, Used by Pope Francis until his death in 2025)
- Villa Barberini (Summer Residence of Pope Leo XIV, part of Pontifical Villas of Castel Gandolfo)

===== Former =====
- Lateran Palace (Pope, formerly; currently houses in part the Vicariate of Rome and the Pontifical Museum of Christian Antiquities)
- Palace of the Popes in Viterbo (Pope, formerly; part of the Museo del Colle del Duomo)
- Papal Palace, Orvieto (Pope, formerly; houses the Museo Opera del Duomo)
- Papal Palace, Perugia (Pope, formerly; destroyed by fire in 1534)
- Palace of the Popes in Anagni (Pope, formerly; part of the Museo bonifaciano e del Lazio meridionale
- Palais des Papes, Avignon (Pope, formerly; houses a convention centre and the archives of the département of Vaucluse).
- Castel Sant'Angelo (Pope, formerly; kept as Museo Nazionale di Castel Sant'Angelo)
- Palace of Castel Gandolfo (Pope, formerly; currently a museum)
- Mater Ecclesiae Monastery (Used by Pope Benedict XVI until his death in 2022)

=== North America ===
==== Antigua and Barbuda ====
- Government House (Governor-General)

==== Bahamas ====
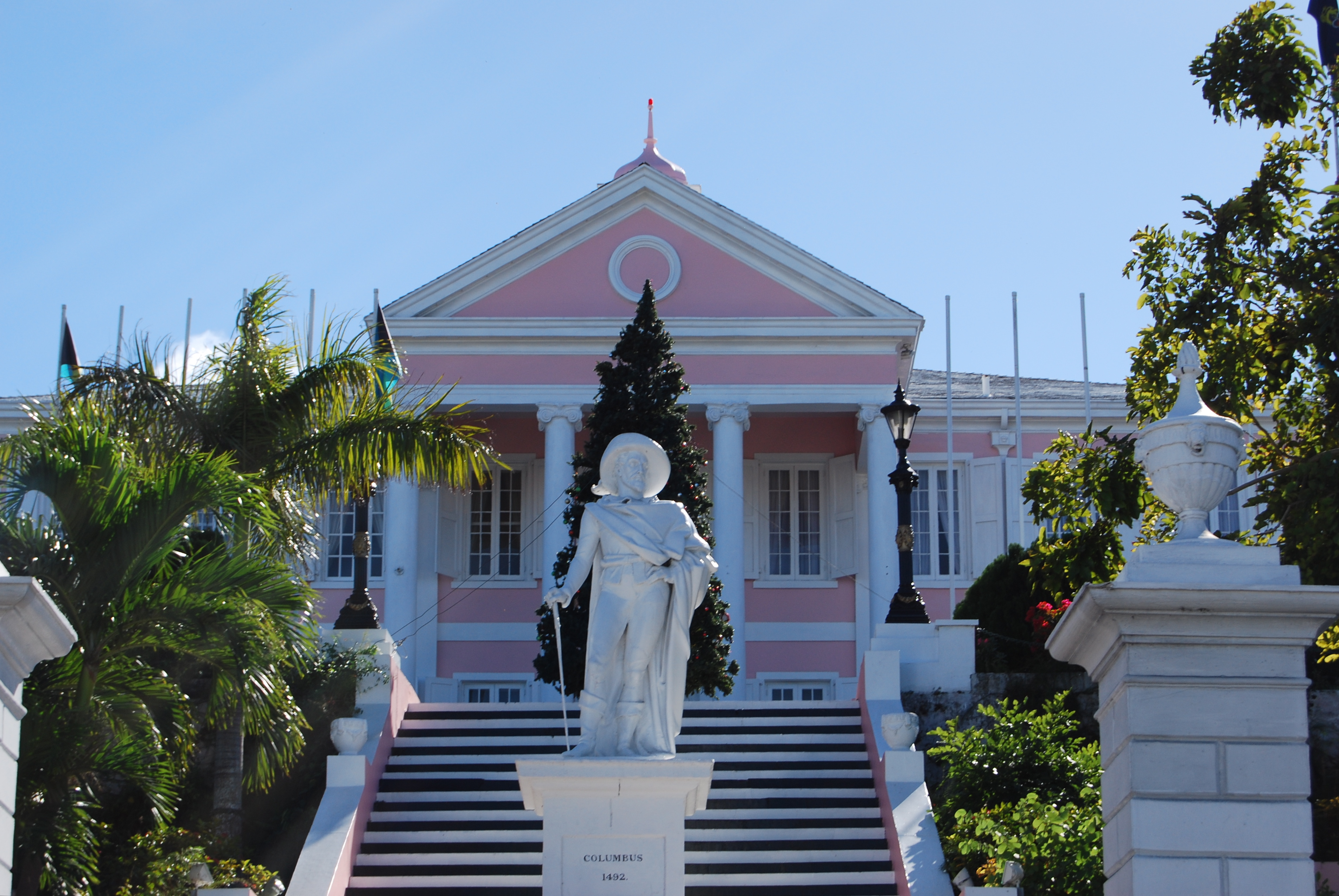
Government House, The Bahamas

- Government House (King and the Governor-General)

==== Barbados ====
- State House (President)
- Ilaro Court (Prime Minister)

==== Belize ====
- Belize House (King and the Governor-General)

===== Former =====
- Government House (King and the Governor-General, formerly; kept for official government functions, state guest house for visiting foreign dignitaries, and as House of Culture Museum)

==== Canada ====
===== Federal =====
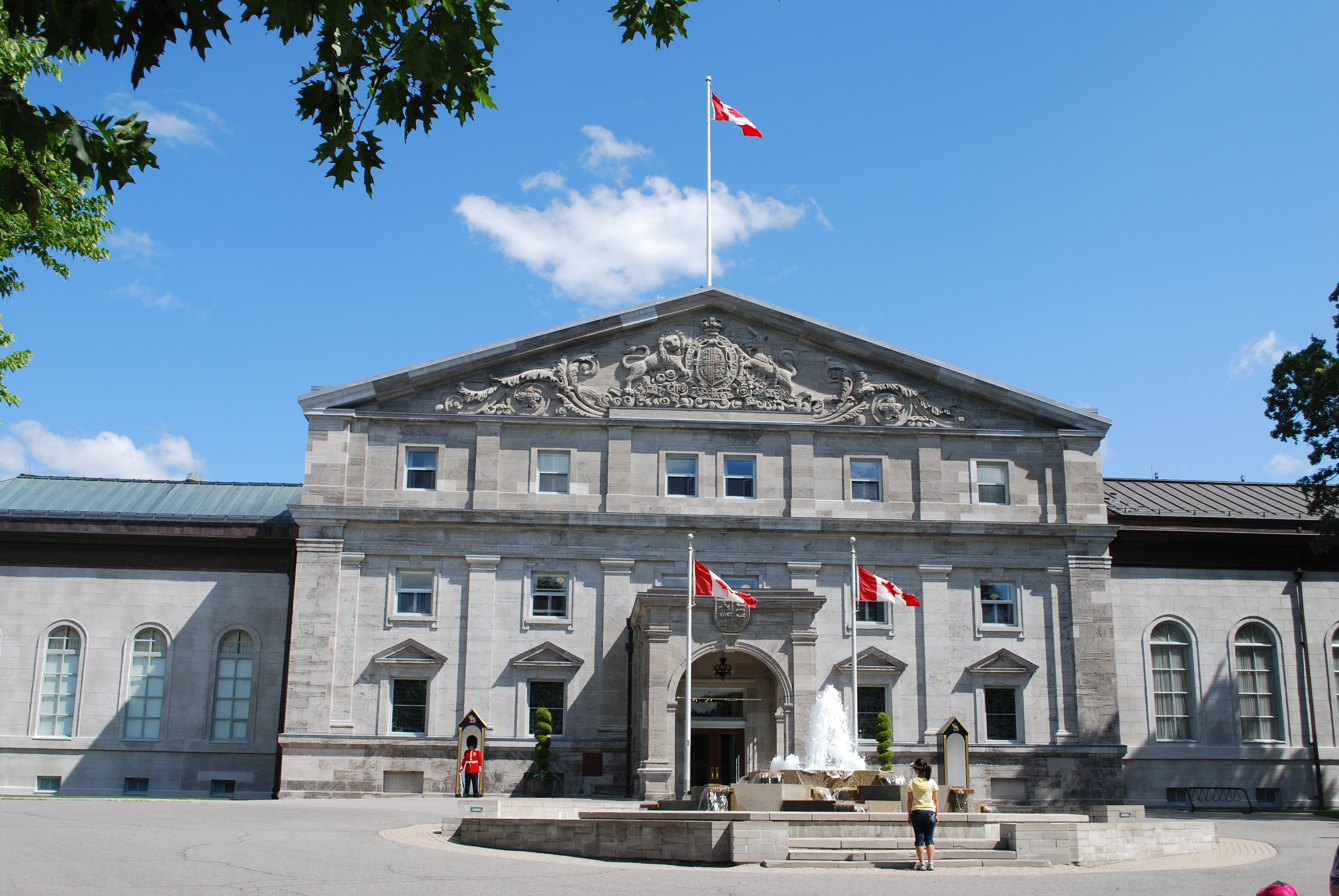
Rideau Hall in Ottawa

- Rideau Hall (King and governor general, Ottawa residence)
- Citadelle of Quebec (King and governor general, Quebec City residence)

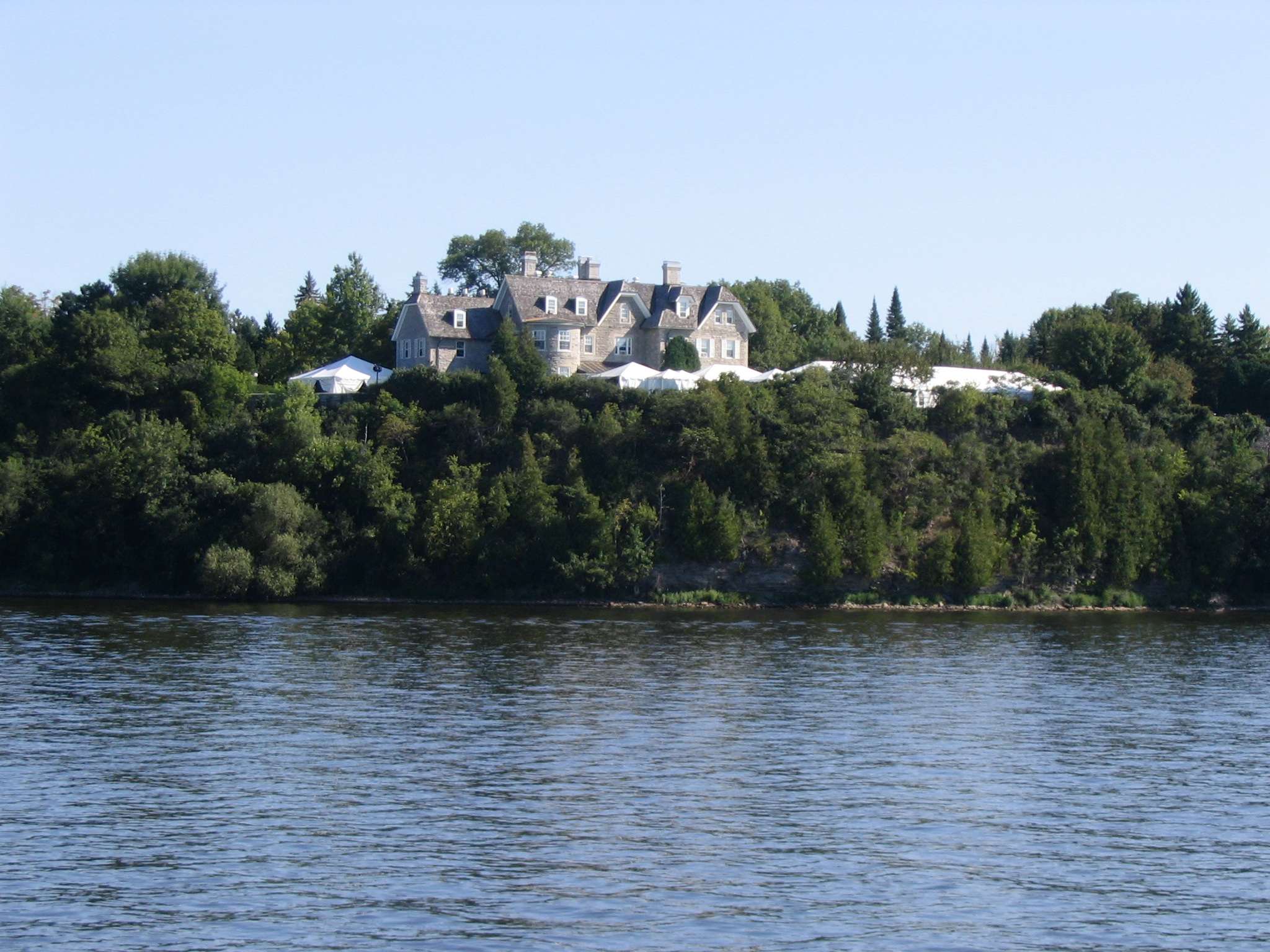
View of 24 Sussex Drive from across the Ottawa River

- 24 Sussex Drive (prime minister)
- Harrington Lake (prime minister, country retreat)
- Stornoway (leader of the opposition)
- The Farm, Gatineau Park (speaker of the House of Commons)
- 7 Rideau Gate (state guest house)

===== Provincial =====
- British Columbia:
  Government House (lieutenant governor)
- Manitoba:
  Government House (lieutenant governor)
- New Brunswick:
  Old Government House (lieutenant governor)
- Newfoundland and Labrador:
  Government House (lieutenant governor)
- Nova Scotia:
  Government House (lieutenant governor)
- Prince Edward Island:
  Government House (lieutenant governor)
- Quebec:
  Édifice Price/Price Building (premier)

The provinces of Ontario and Quebec no longer have official residences for their lieutenant governors, but do provide them with accommodations; in the case of Ontario, only if necessary. There is a Government House in Regina, Saskatchewan, though it does not serve as a residence, containing only the lieutenant governor's offices. Alberta also has a Government House, but it is used solely for official entertaining and meetings.

==== Costa Rica ====
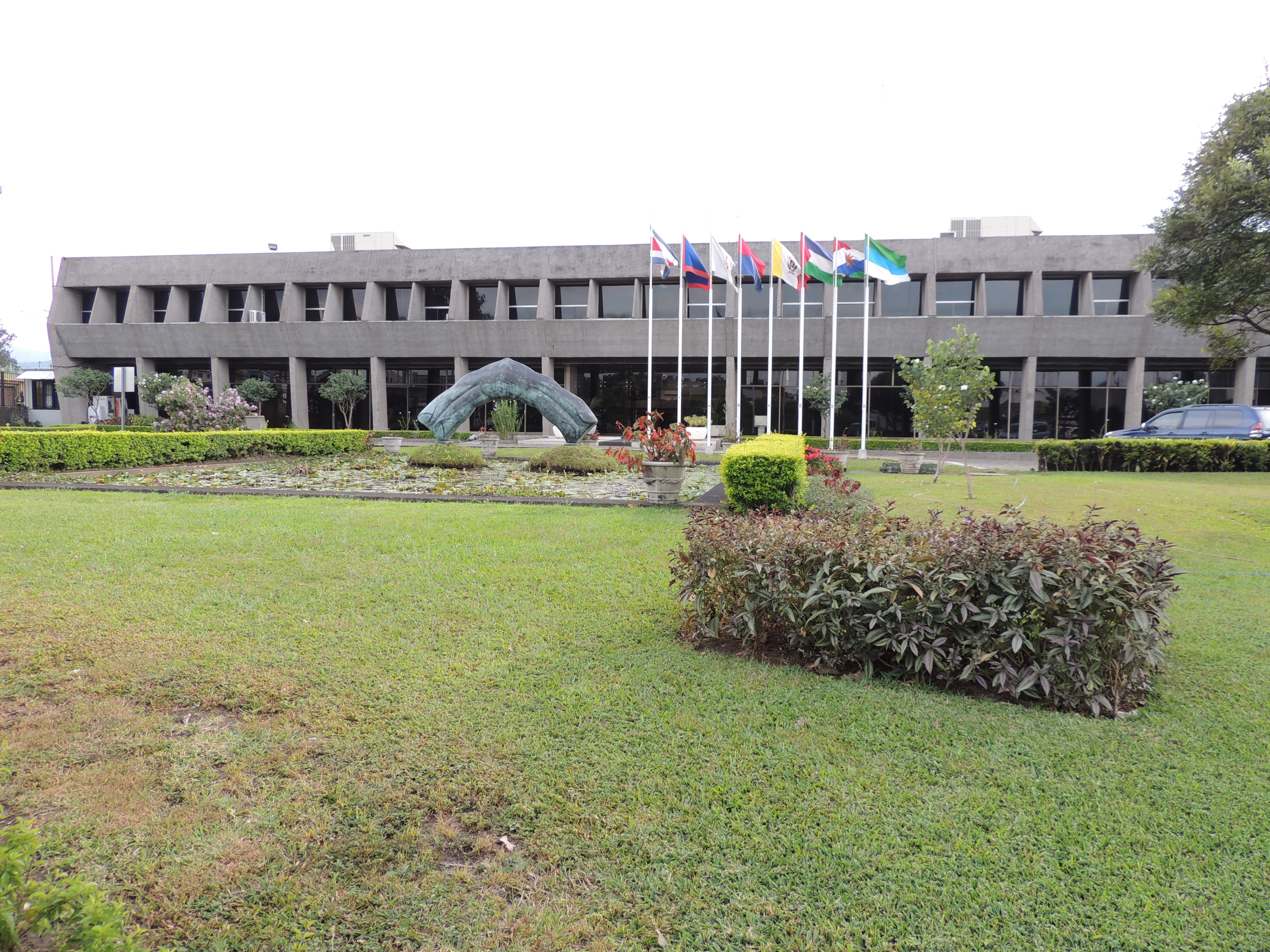
Casa Presidencial

- Casa Presidencial, Costa Rica (President)

==== Cuba ====
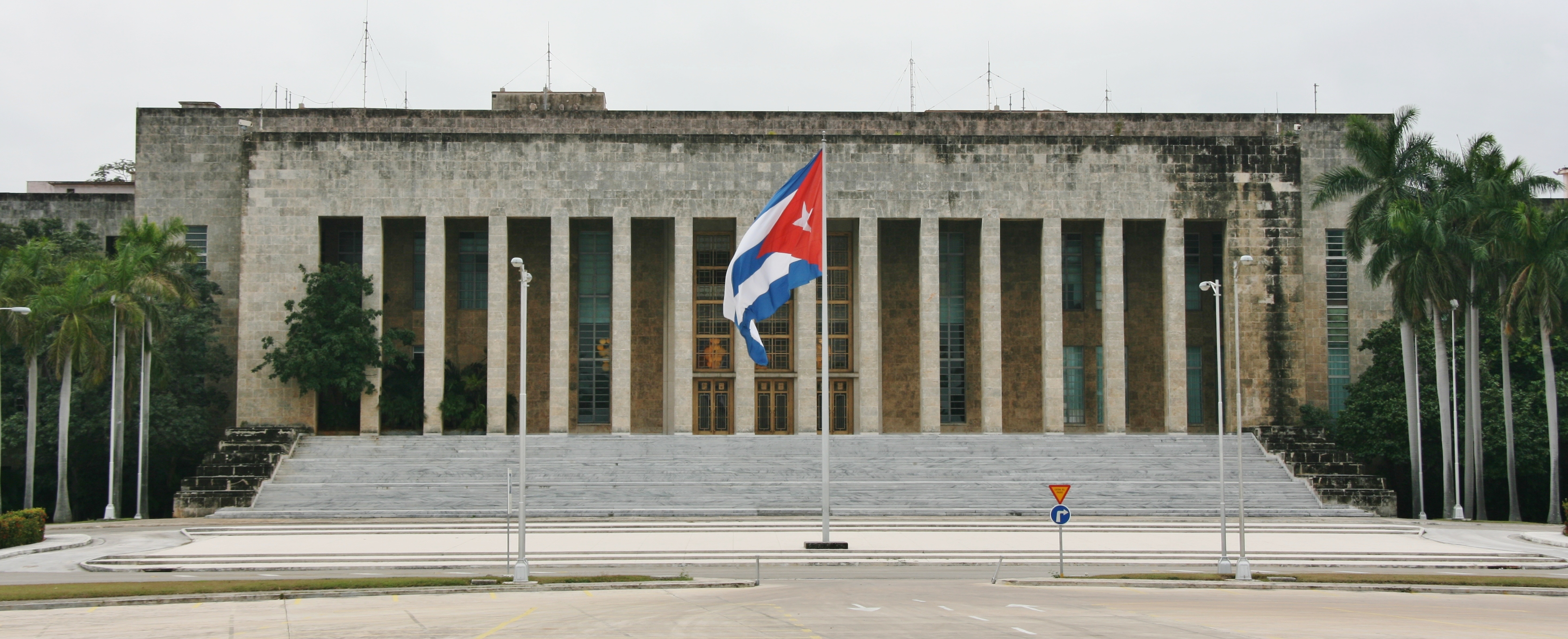
Palace of the Revolution

- Palace of the Revolution (First Secretary)

==== Former ====
- Presidential Palace (President)

==== Dominica ====
- Government House (President)

==== Dominican Republic ====
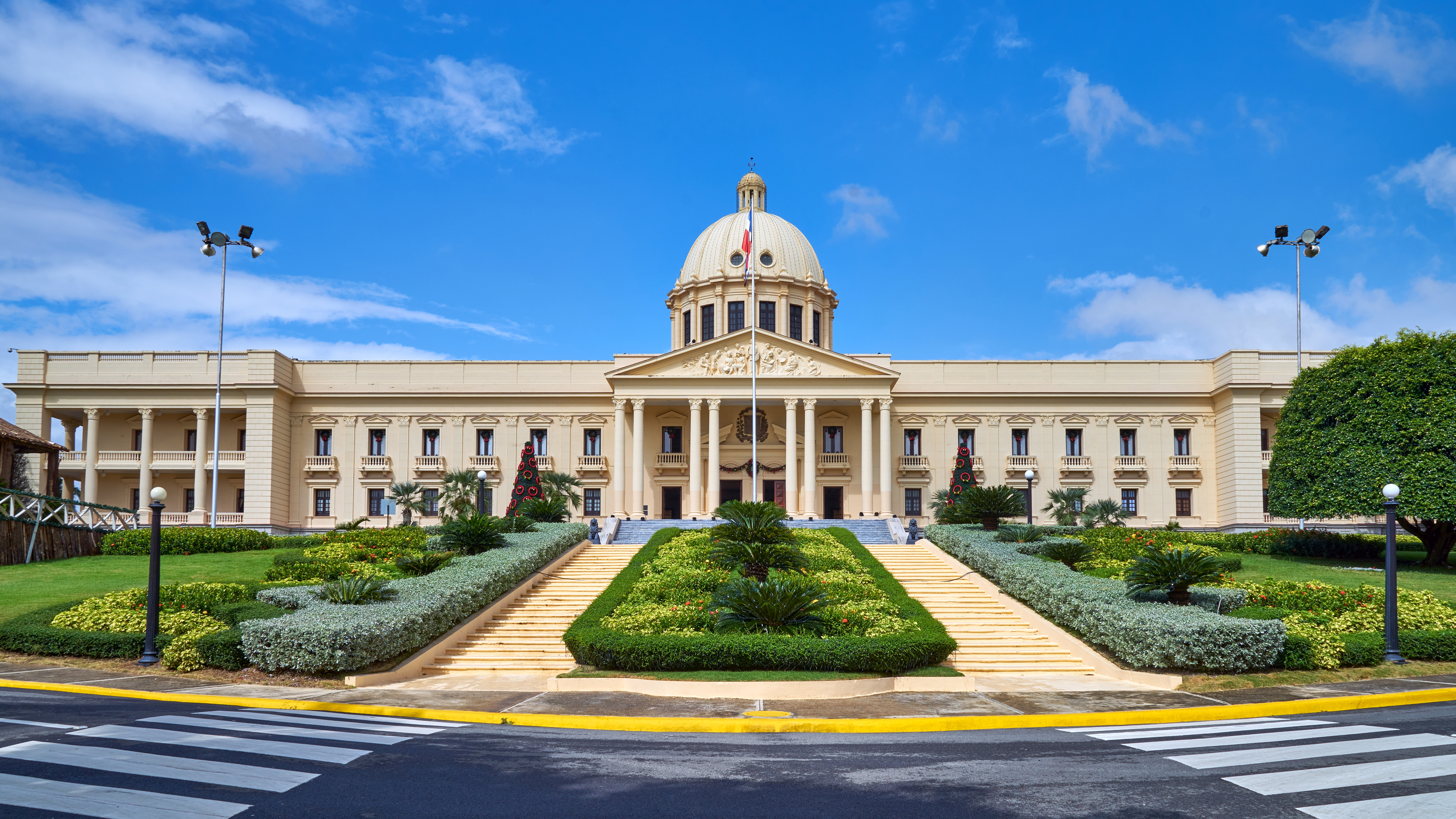
Palacio Nacional, Dominican Republic

- Palacio Nacional, Dominican Republic (President)

==== Grenada ====
- Governor-General's House (Governor-General)
- Mount Royal (Prime Minister)

===== Former =====
- Government House (Governor-General, 1974–2004)

==== Guatemala ====
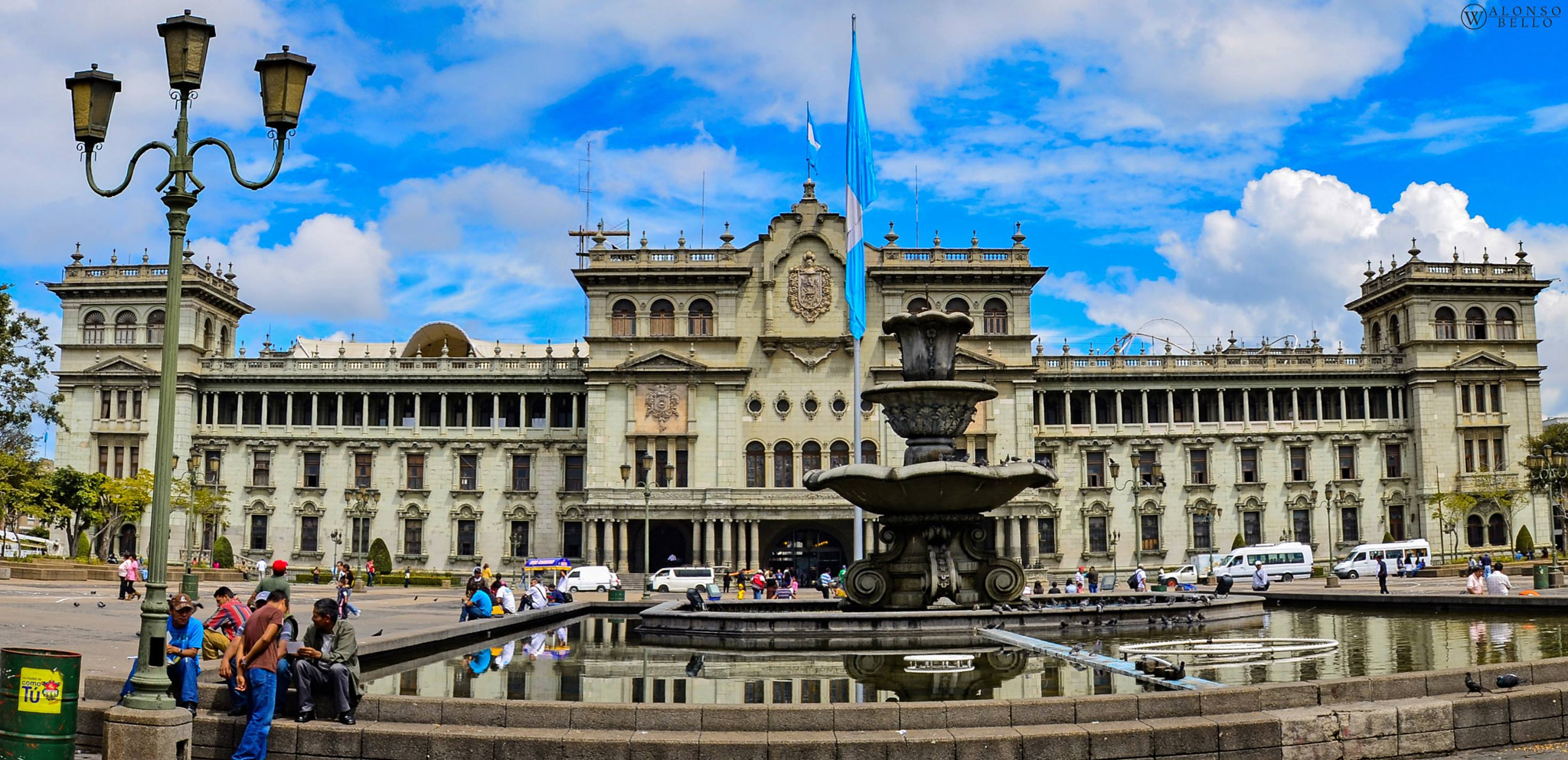
National Palace, Guatemala City (built 1939–1943, renovated 2010, now used as a museum)

- Casa Crema (Casa Presidencial de Guatemala, Guatemala City)

===== Former =====
- National Palace (Guatemala) (built 1939–1943, renovated 2010, now used as a museum)

==== Haiti ====
===== Former =====
- National Palace (destroyed by the 2010 earthquake)

==== Honduras ====
- Palacio José Cecilio del Valle (President)

==== Jamaica ====
- King's House, also Government House (Governor-General)
- Jamaica House (Prime Minister's office)
- Vale Royal (Prime Minister)

==== Mexico ====
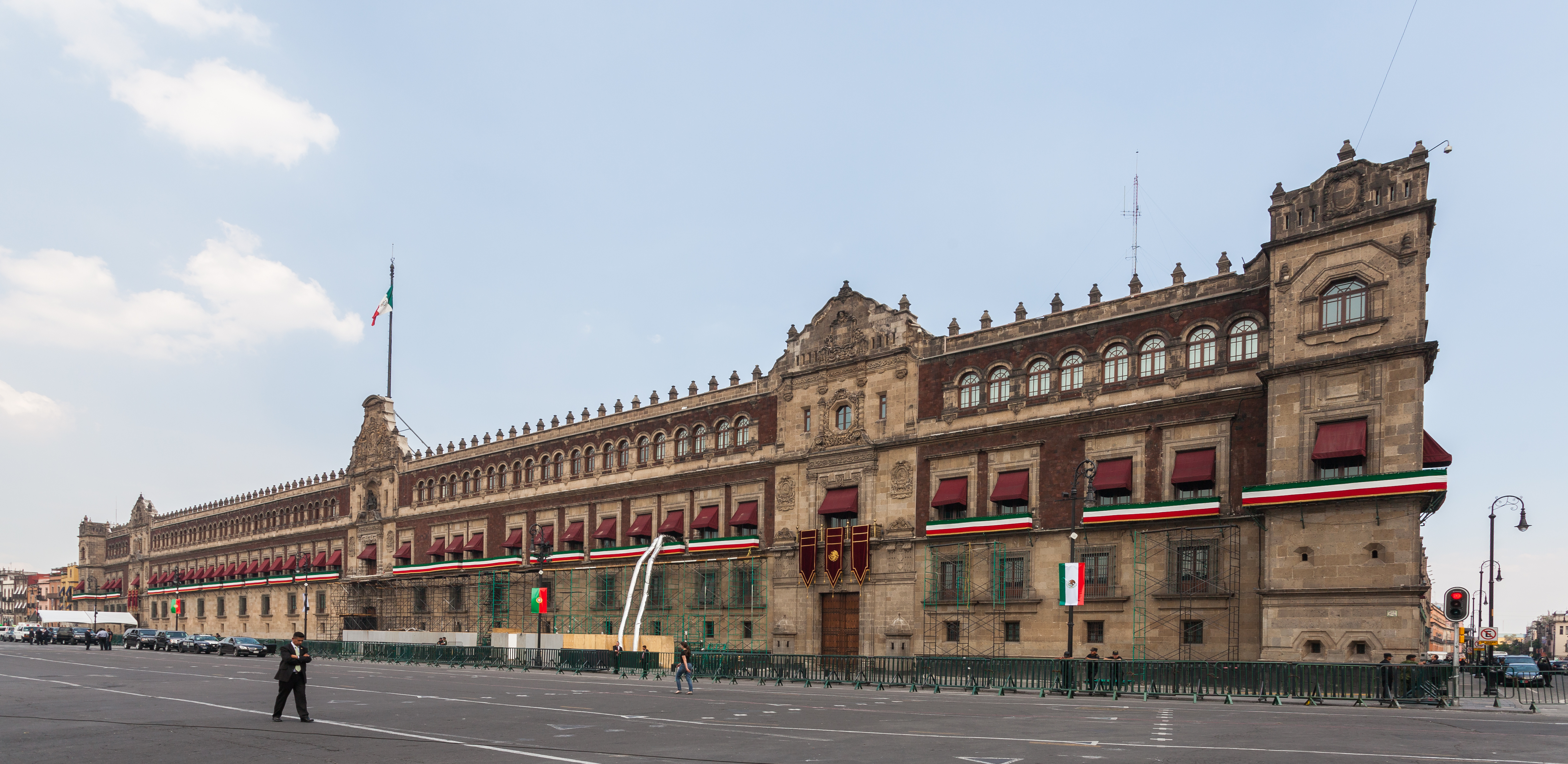
National Palace in Mexico City

- National Palace (President)

===== Former =====
- Los Pinos (Presidential residence and office)
- Castillo de Chapultepec (Emperor then President, formerly; kept as National Museum of History)

*In every state of the Mexico the Palacio de Gobierno, or Government Palace, was the official residence the governor, they are now maintained solely as the relevant governor's offices.

- Casa Borda, Cuernavaca (Emperor's summer residence, formerly; kept as a cultural centre)

===== States =====
Querétaro

- Casa de la Corregidora (Governor mansion)

==== Nicaragua ====
- Presidential Palace
- El Carmen Residence (Residence of president Daniel Ortega)
- Presidential Palace (former)

==== Panama ====
- Palacio de las Garzas (President)

==== Saint Kitts and Nevis ====
- Government House (Governor-General)

==== Saint Lucia ====
- Government House (Governor-General)

==== Saint Vincent and the Grenadines ====
- Government House (Governor-General)

==== Trinidad and Tobago ====
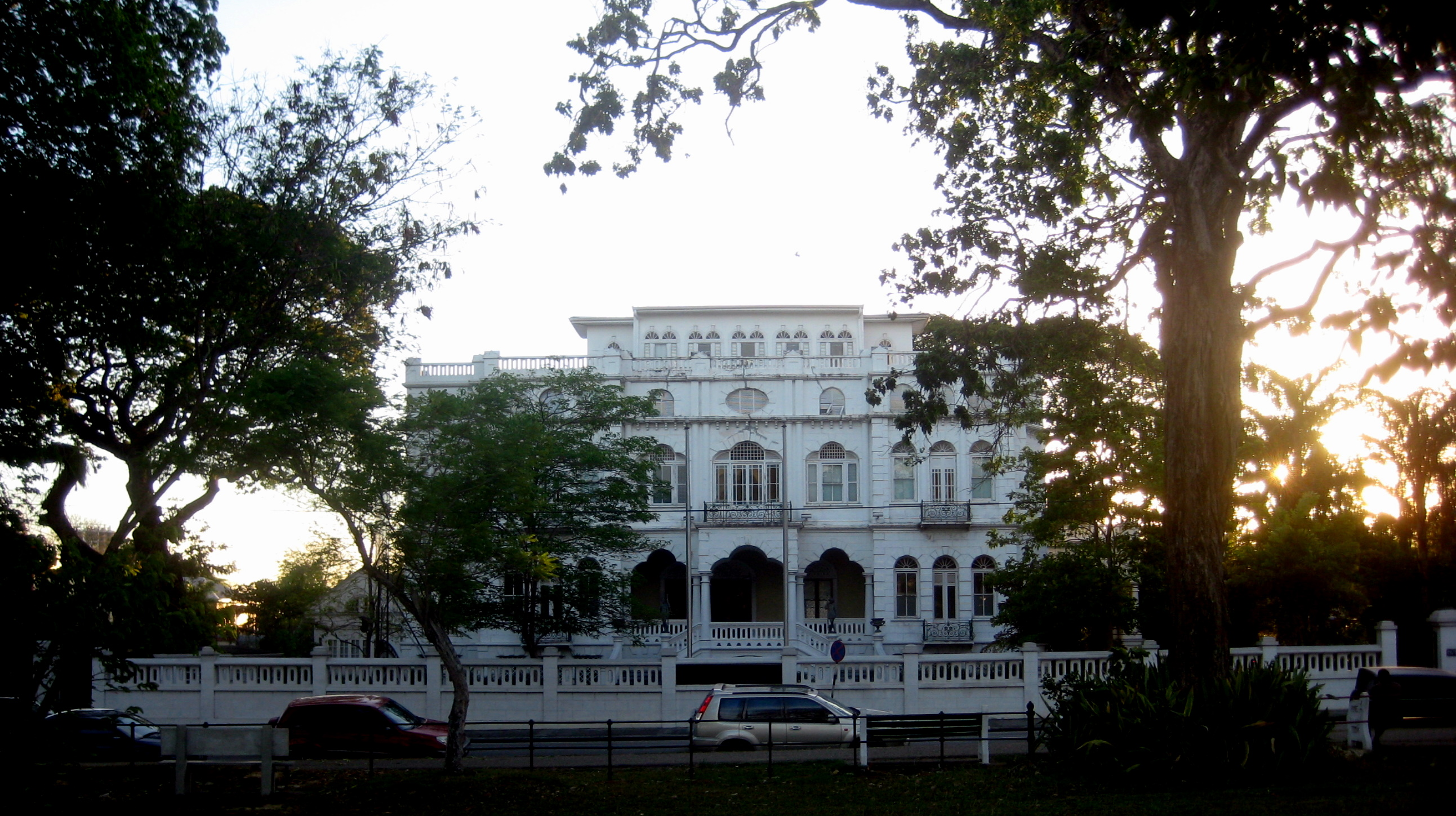
Whitehall, Port of Spain

- President's House
- St. Anns Diplomatic Residence (Prime Minister)
- Whitehall (Prime Minister's office)
- Official residence (Chief Secretary, Tobago House of Assembly)

==== United States ====
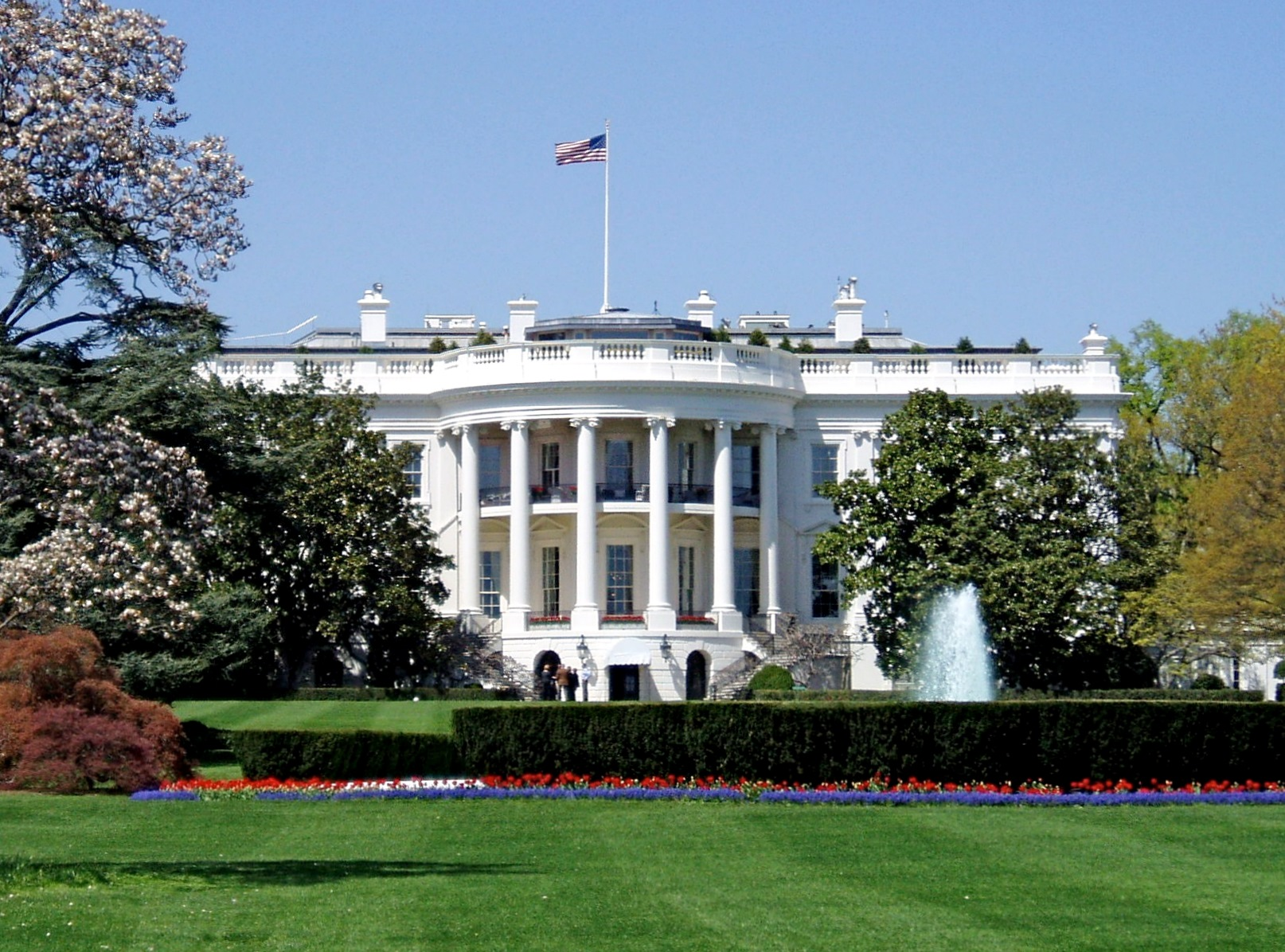
White House, Washington

- White House (President)
- Camp David (President, retreat)
- Number One Observatory Circle (Vice President)
- Blair House (state guest house)
- Presidential Townhouse (guest house for former Presidents)
- Trowbridge House (currently being renovated to replace the Presidential Townhouse)
- Quarters Six (Chairman of the Joint Chiefs of Staff)
- Quarters One (Chief of Staff of the United States Army)
- Quarters Seven / Air House (Chief of Staff of the United States Air Force)
- Tingey House (Chief of Naval Operations)
- Historic Home of the Commandants (Commandant of the Marine Corps)
- 50 United Nations Plaza 37th floor penthouse (Ambassador to the United Nations)
- Childers House (Base Commander of Fort Campbell)

===== State =====
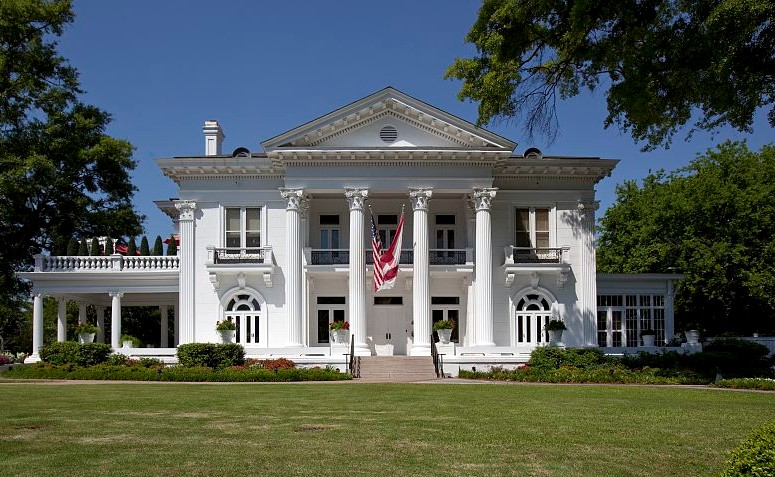
Alabama Governor's Mansion

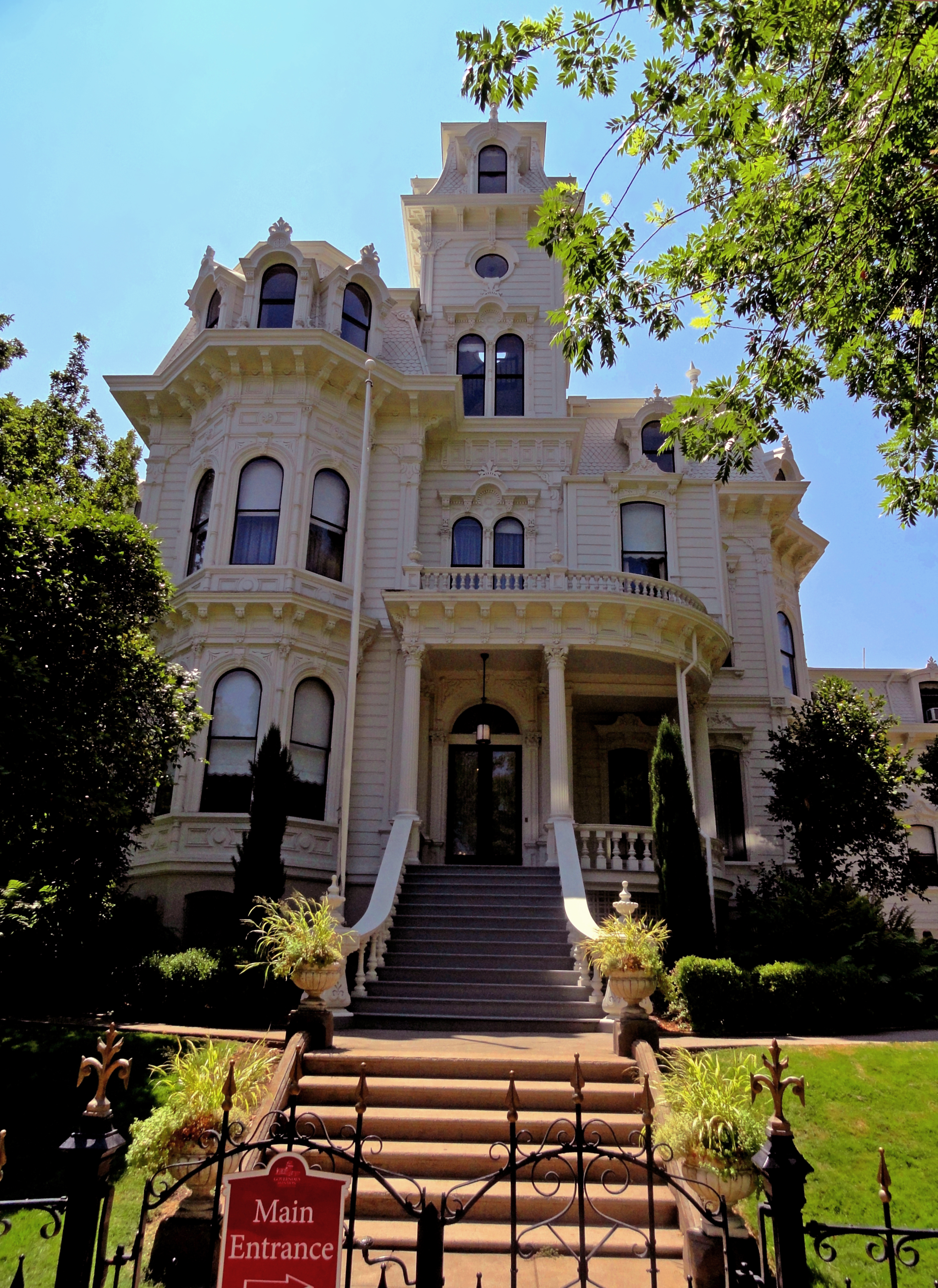
California Governor's Mansion

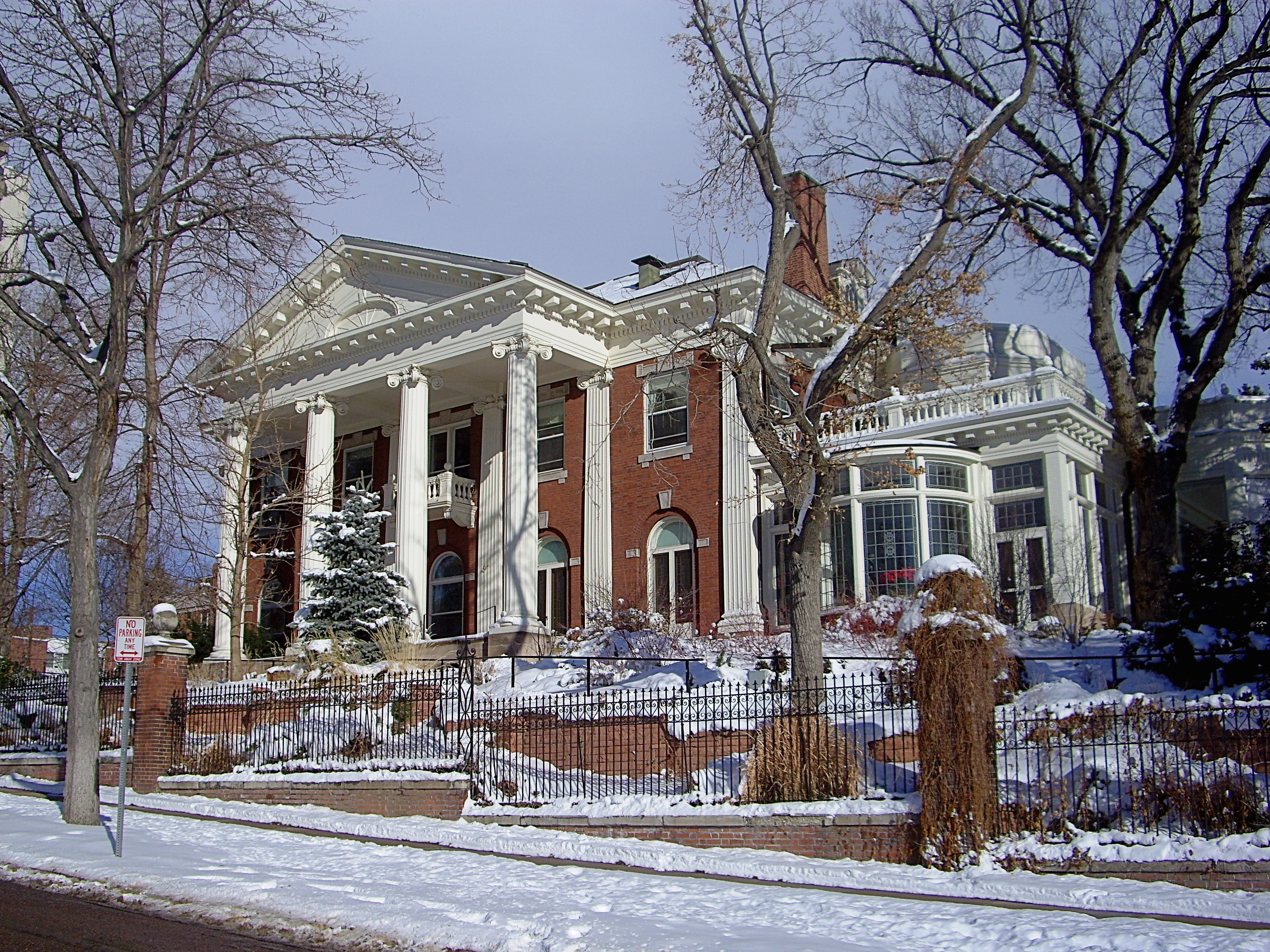
Colorado Governor's Mansion

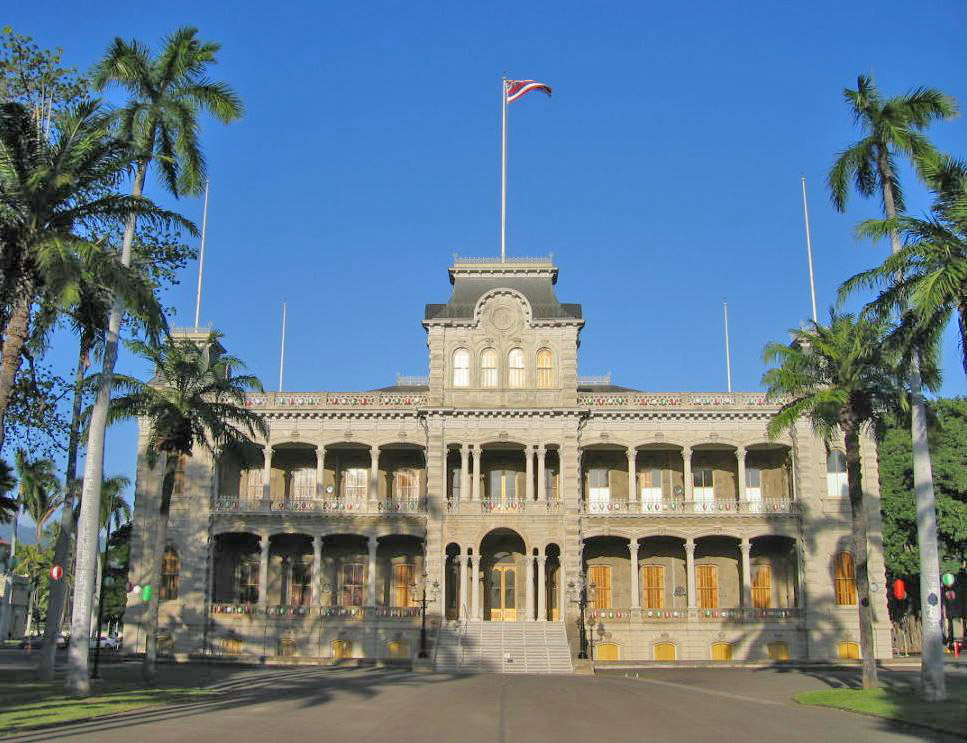
Hawaiʻi: ʻIolani Palace

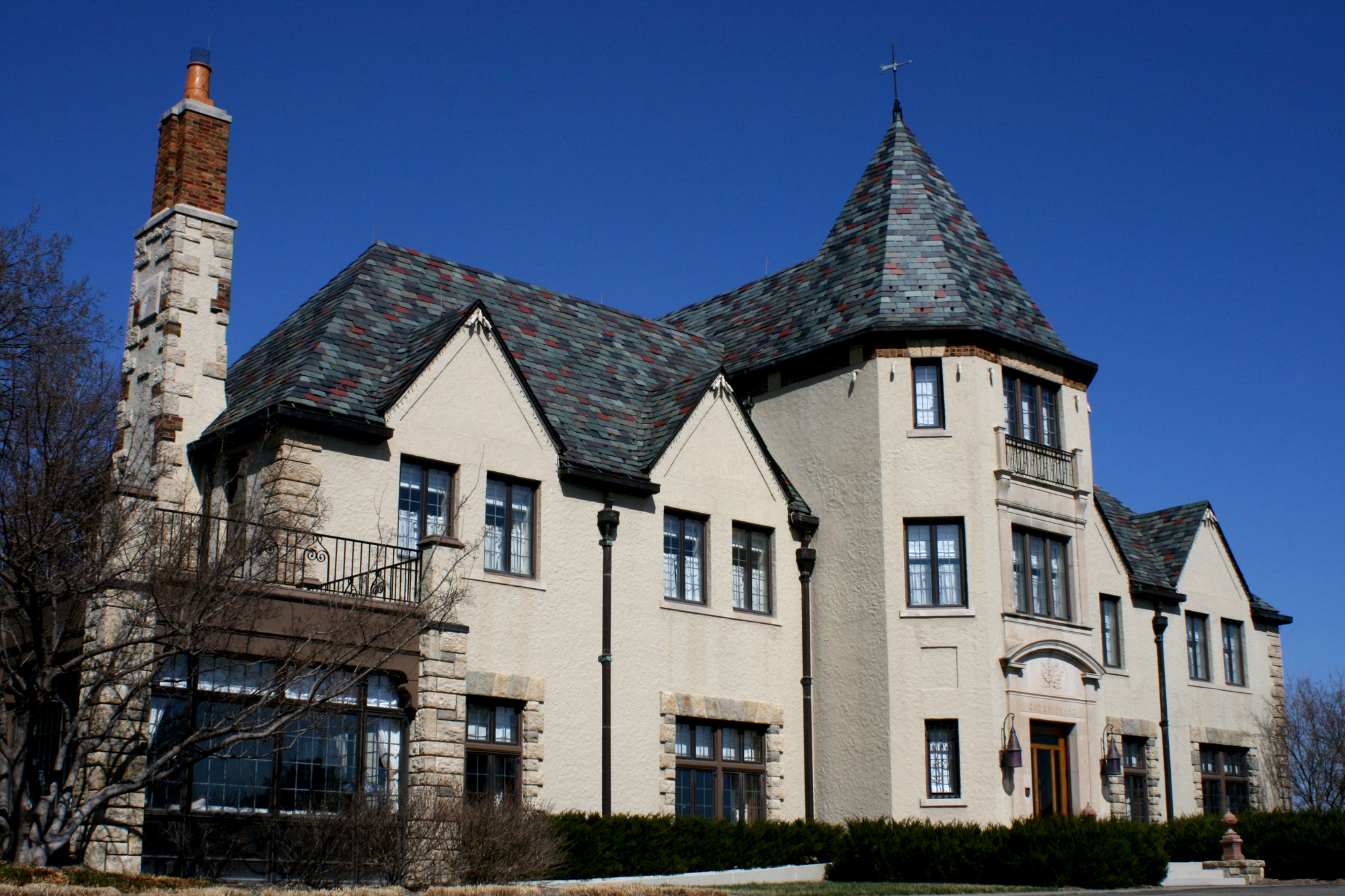
Kansas: Cedar Crest

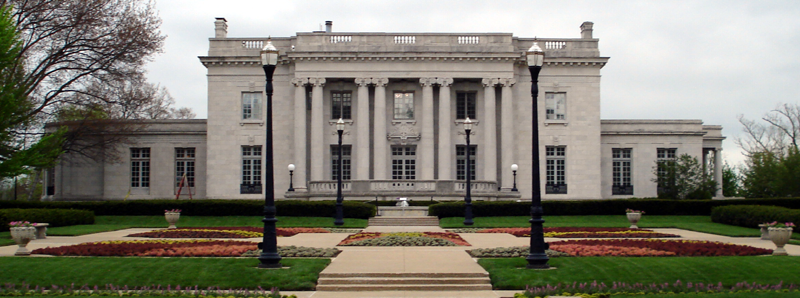
Kentucky Governor's Mansion

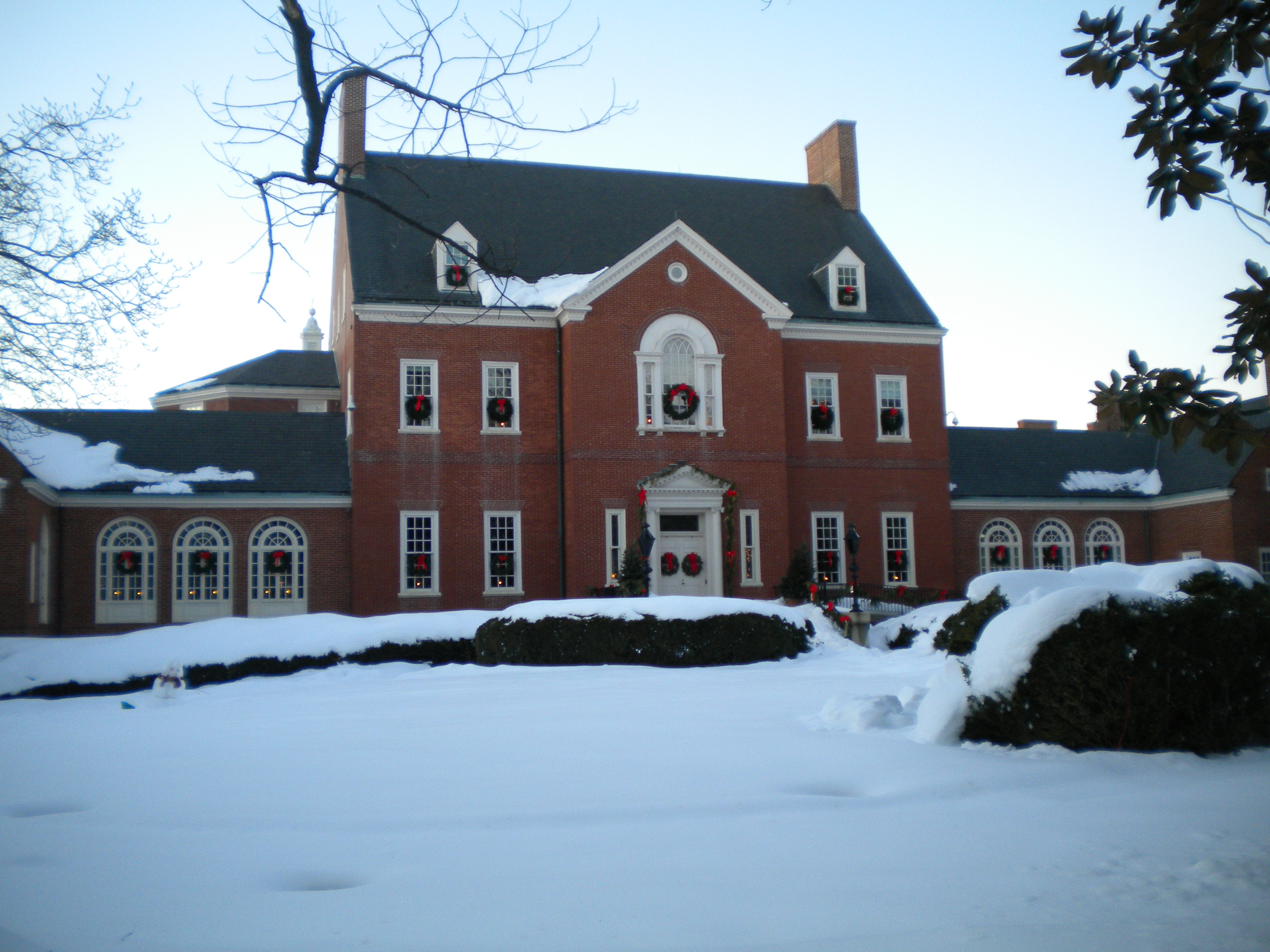
Maryland: Government House

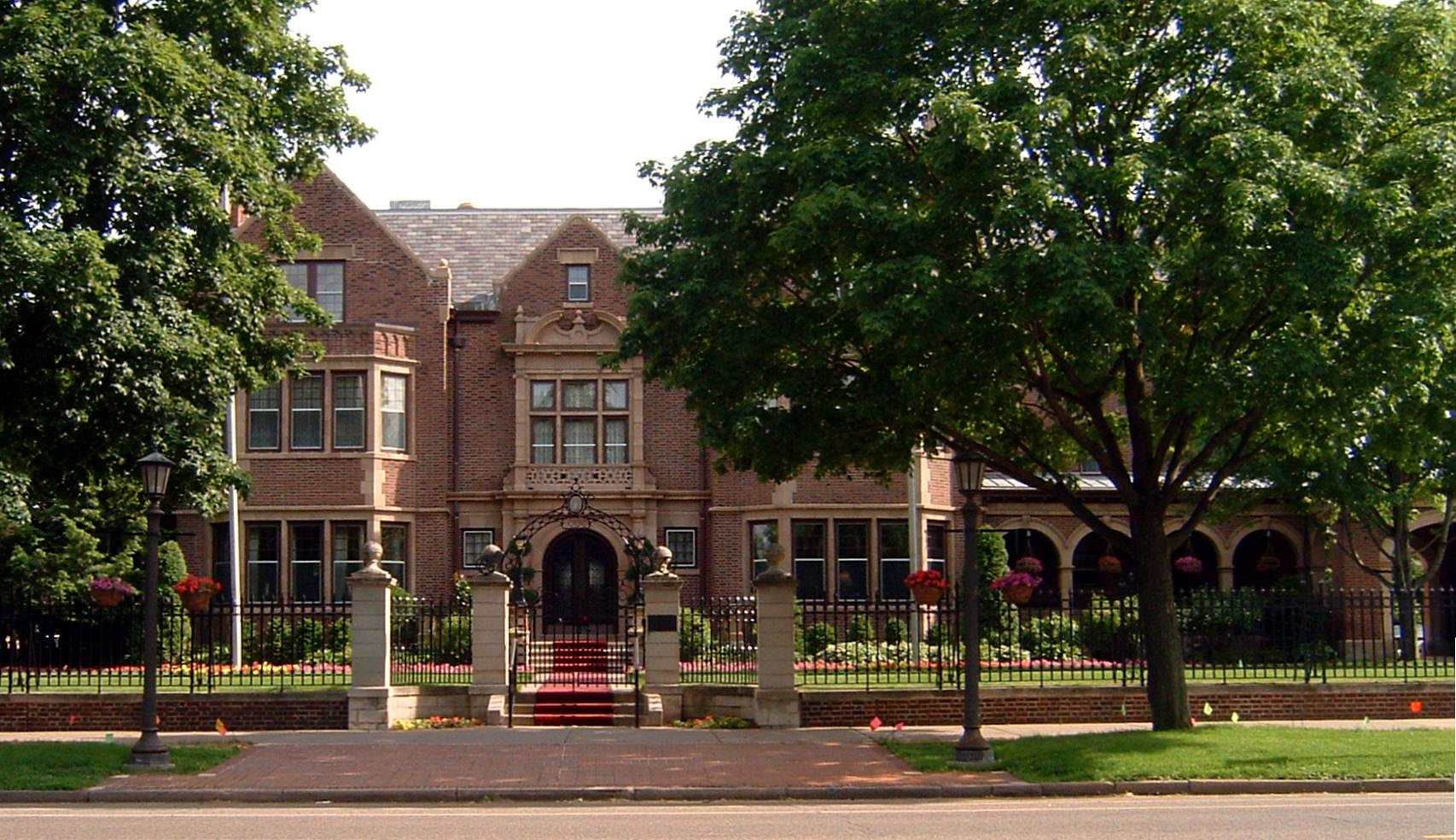
Minnesota Governor's Residence

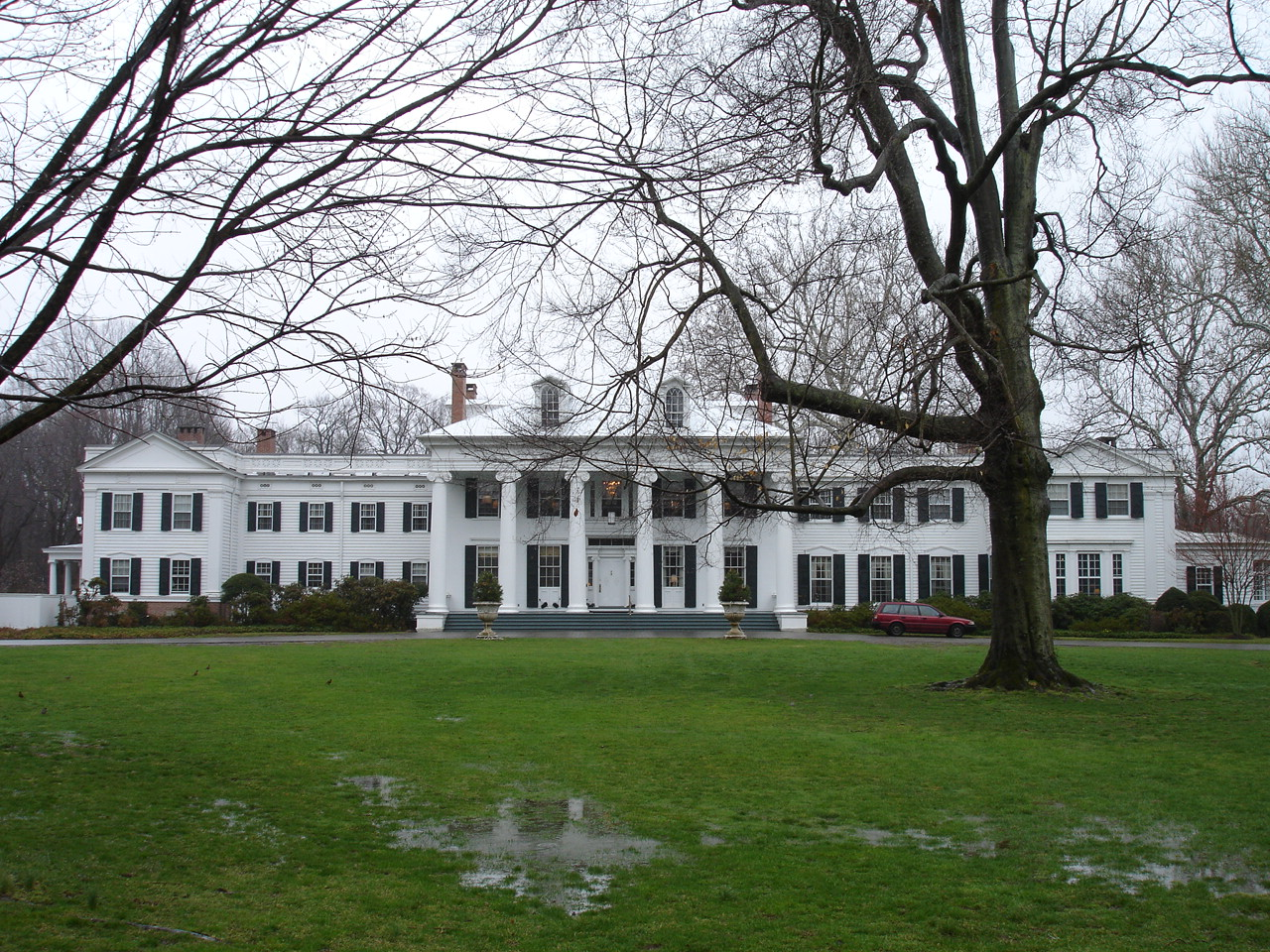
New Jersey: Drumthwacket

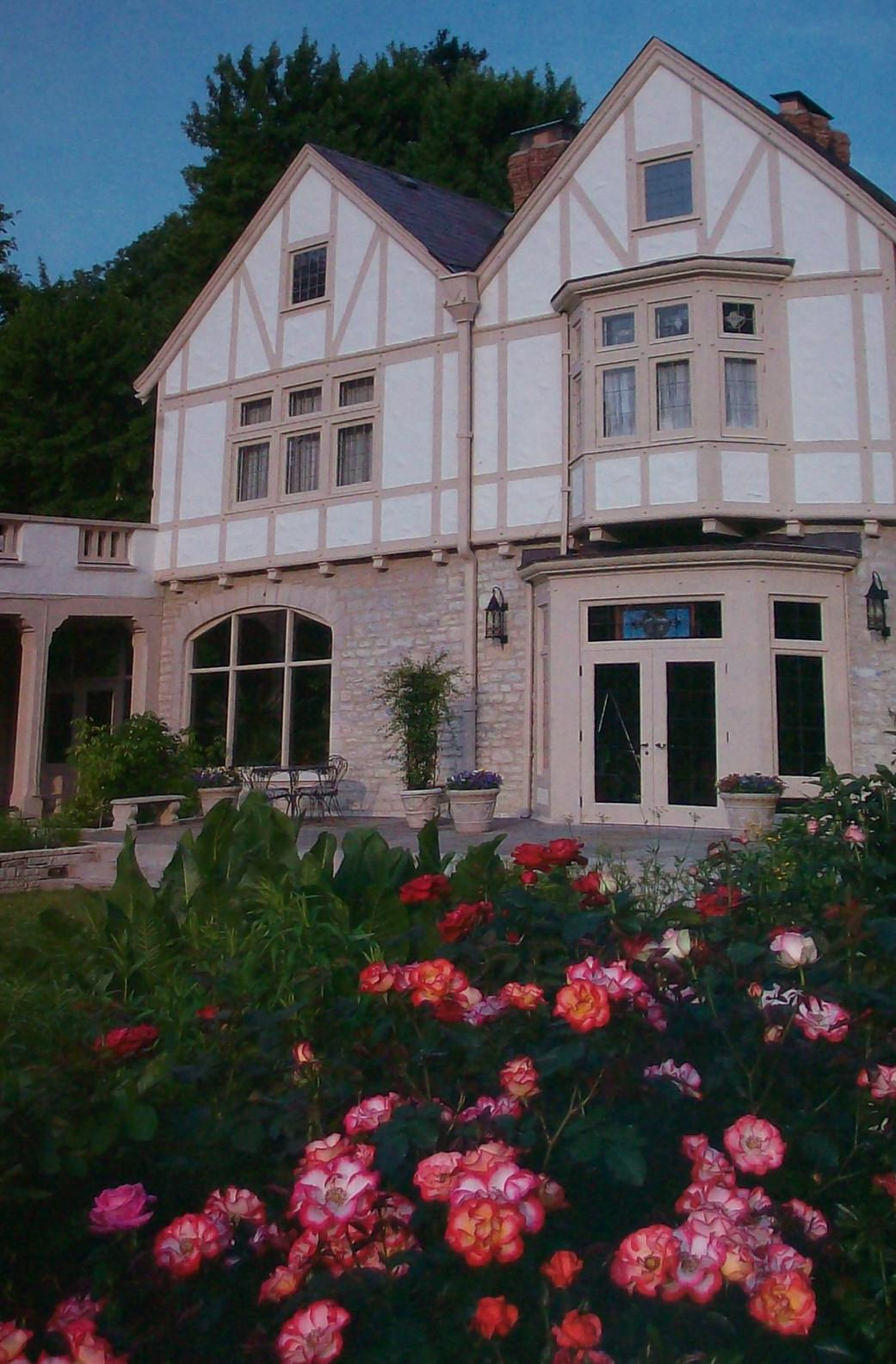
Ohio Governor's Mansion

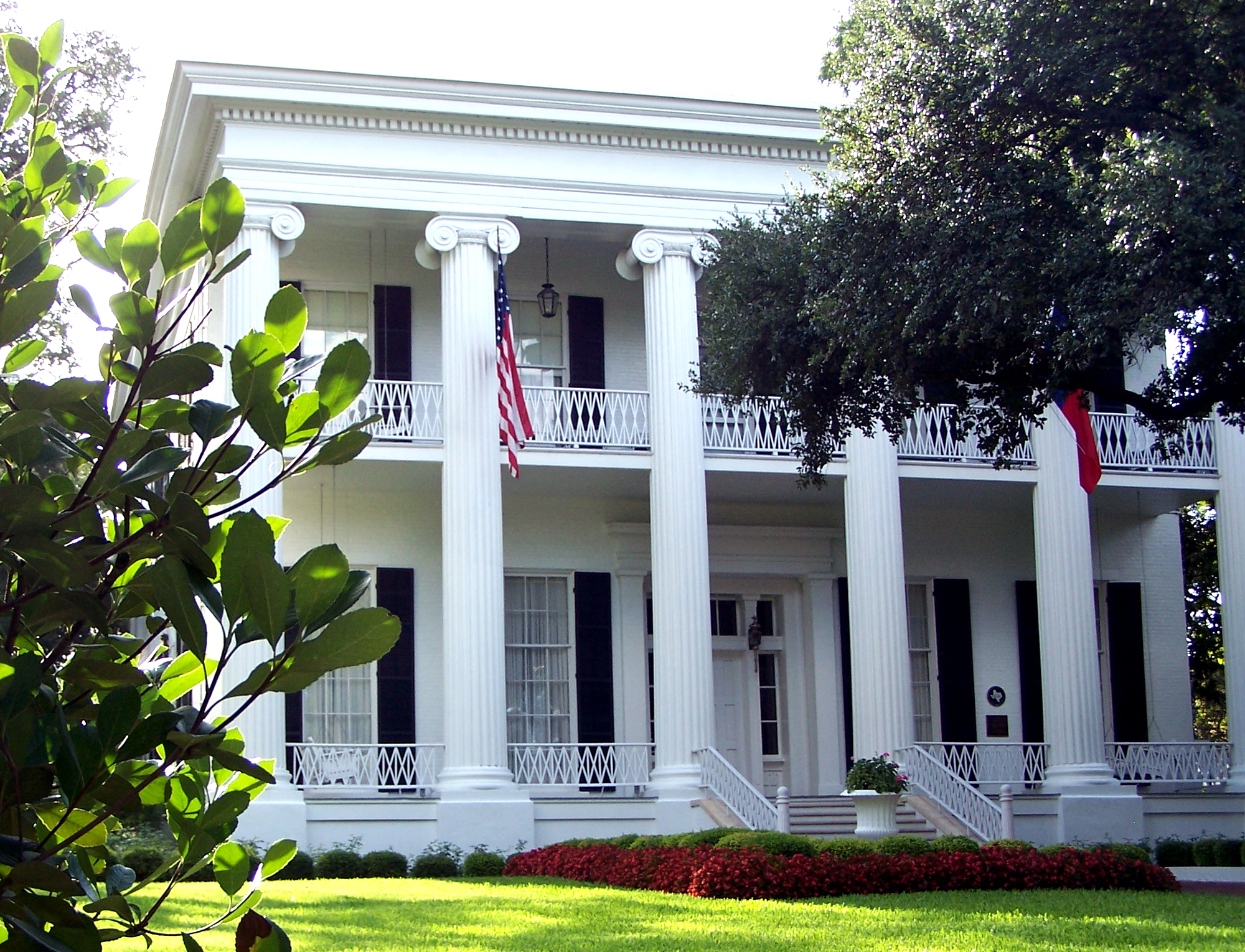
Texas Governor's Mansion

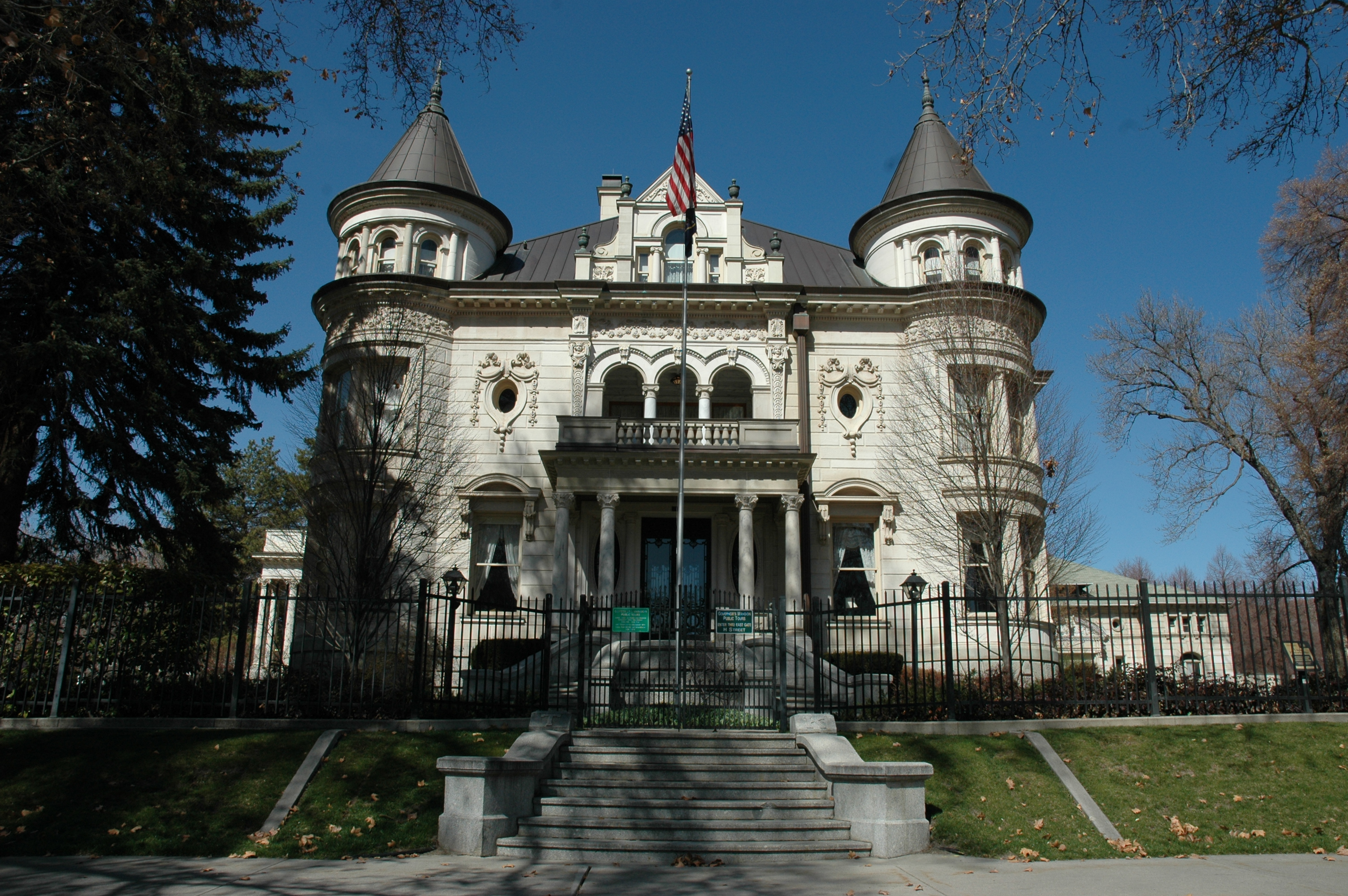
Utah Governor's Mansion

- Alabama:
  Governor's Mansion
- Alaska:
  Governor's Mansion
- Arizona:
  none
- Arkansas:
  Governor's Mansion
- California:
  Governor's Mansion
- Colorado:
  Governor's Mansion
- Connecticut:
  Governor's Mansion
- Delaware:
  Woodburn
- Florida:
  Governor's Mansion
- Georgia:
  Governor's Mansion
- Hawaii:
  Washington Place (Queen then Governor, formerly kept as museum)
  ʻIolani Palace (Monarch, formerly kept for official government functions)
  Huliheʻe Palace (Monarch, formerly retained as museum)
- Idaho:
  none
- Illinois:
  Executive Mansion (Governor)
- Indiana:
  Governor's Mansion
- Iowa:
  Terrace Hill
- Kansas:
  Cedar Crest
- Kentucky:
  Governor's Mansion
  Old Governor's Mansion (now official residence of the lieutenant governor)
- Louisiana:
  Governor's Mansion
- Maine:
  Blaine House
- Maryland:
  Government House
  Jennings House (from 1777 to 1870)
- Massachusetts:
  none
- Michigan:
  Governor's Residence, Lansing
  Governor's Summer Residence, Mackinac Island
- Minnesota:
  Governor's Residence
- Mississippi:
  Governor's Residence
- Missouri:
  Governor's Mansion
- Montana:
  Governor's Mansion
- Nebraska:
  Governor's Mansion
- Nevada:
  Governor's Mansion
- New Hampshire:
  Bridges House
- New Jersey:
  Drumthwacket
  Governor's Ocean Residence (Summer Residence)
- New Mexico:
  Governor's Mansion
- New York:
  Executive Mansion
- North Carolina:
  Executive Mansion
  Western Residence (Mountain Retreat)
- North Dakota:
  Governor's Mansion
- Ohio:
  Governor's Mansion
- Oklahoma:
  Governor's Mansion
- Oregon:
  Stiff-Jarman House (prior to 1988)
- Pennsylvania:
  Governor's Mansion
- Rhode Island:
  none
- South Carolina:
  Governor's Mansion
- South Dakota:
  Governor's Mansion
- Tennessee:
  Governor's Mansion
- Texas:
  Governor's Mansion
  Texas Speaker's Apartment (at Texas State Capitol)
  Texas Lieutenant Governor's Apartment (prior to 1983 fire) (at Texas State Capitol)
- Utah:
  Governor's Mansion
- Vermont:
  The Pavilion
- Virginia:
  Executive Mansion
- Washington:
  Governor's Mansion
- West Virginia:
  Executive Mansion
- Wisconsin:
  Governor's Mansion
- Wyoming:
  Governor's Mansion

===== Territorial =====
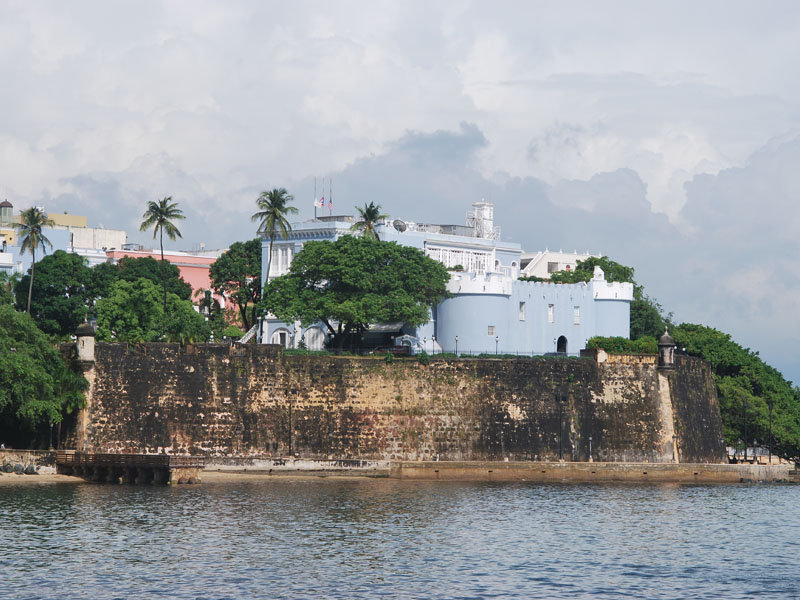
La Fortaleza in Old San Juan is the oldest executive residence in continuous use in the New World, the Americas

- Puerto Rico:
  La Fortaleza (Governor's Mansion)
  Playa El Convento (Governor's Beach Retreat)
- Guam:
  Government House (Governor)

===== Local =====
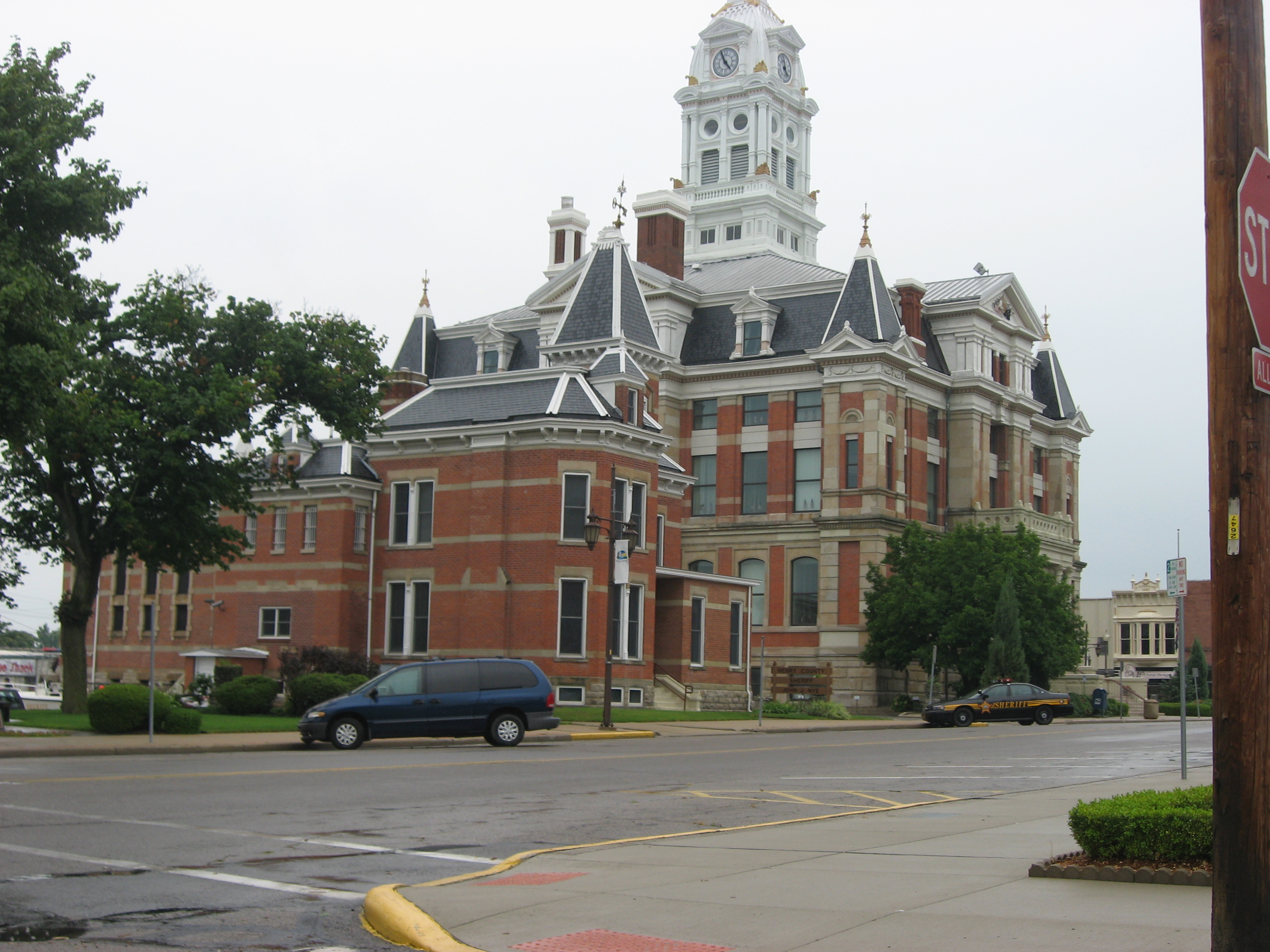
Henry County Sheriff's Residence and Jail

Some mayors in cities with an official mayor's residence choose instead to reside at their private residence, using the official residence for official functions only. This has occurred in the 21st century in Detroit and New York City, although as of 2026 the mayors of both cities live in the official residences. In the case of Denver, no mayor has ever lived in the official residence; the city instead makes it available to certain non-profit groups for special functions.

- Denver, Colorado:
  Cableland
- Detroit, Michigan:
  Manoogian Mansion
- Los Angeles, California:
  Getty House
- New York City:
  Gracie Mansion
- Henry County, Ohio:
  Henry County Sheriff's Residence and Jail (former)

=== South America ===
==== Argentina ====
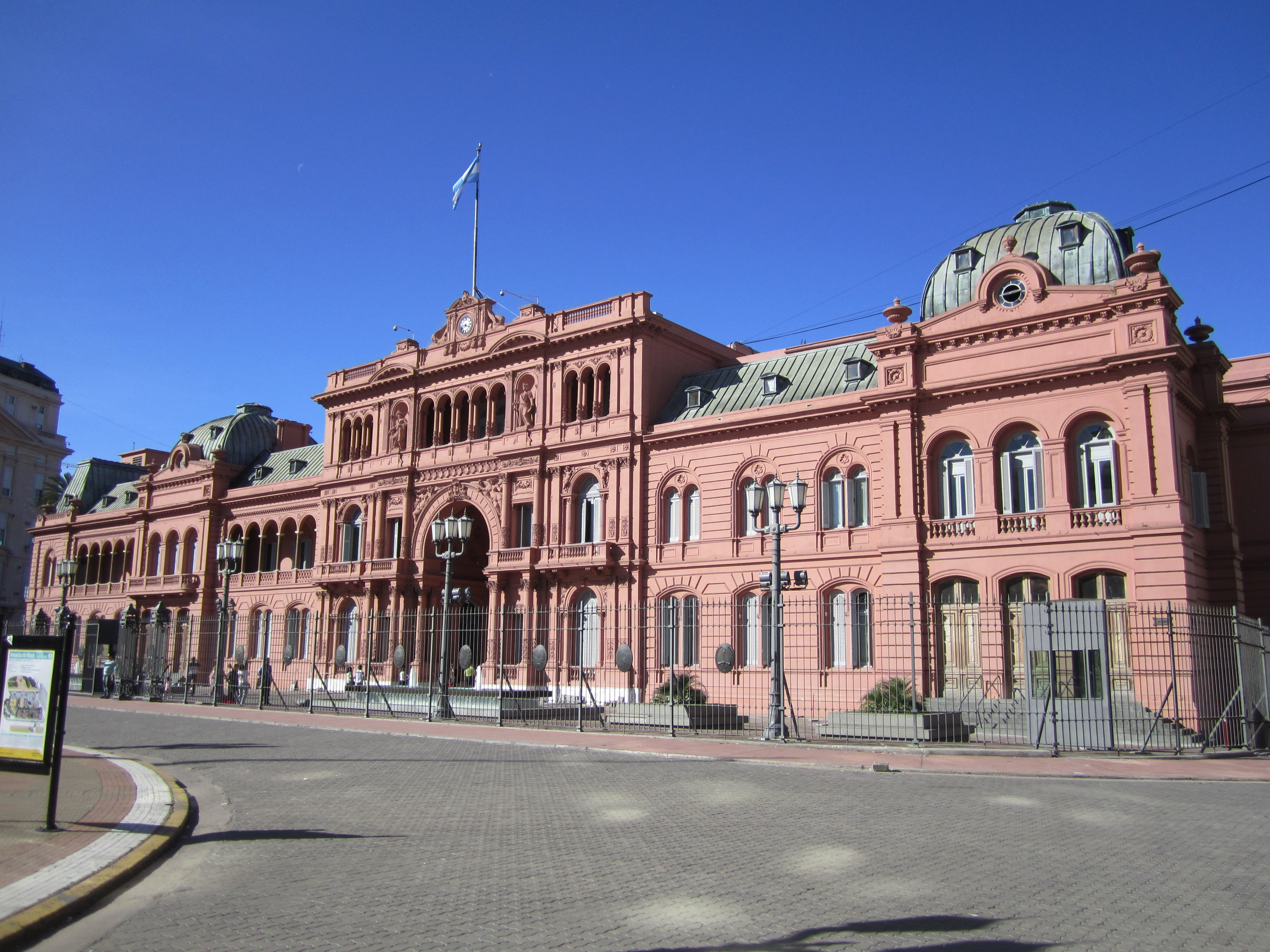
Casa Rosada, Buenos Aires

- Casa Rosada (Presidential office)
- Quinta de Olivos (Presidential residence)
- Chapadmalal Residence (Summer House)

==== Bolivia ====
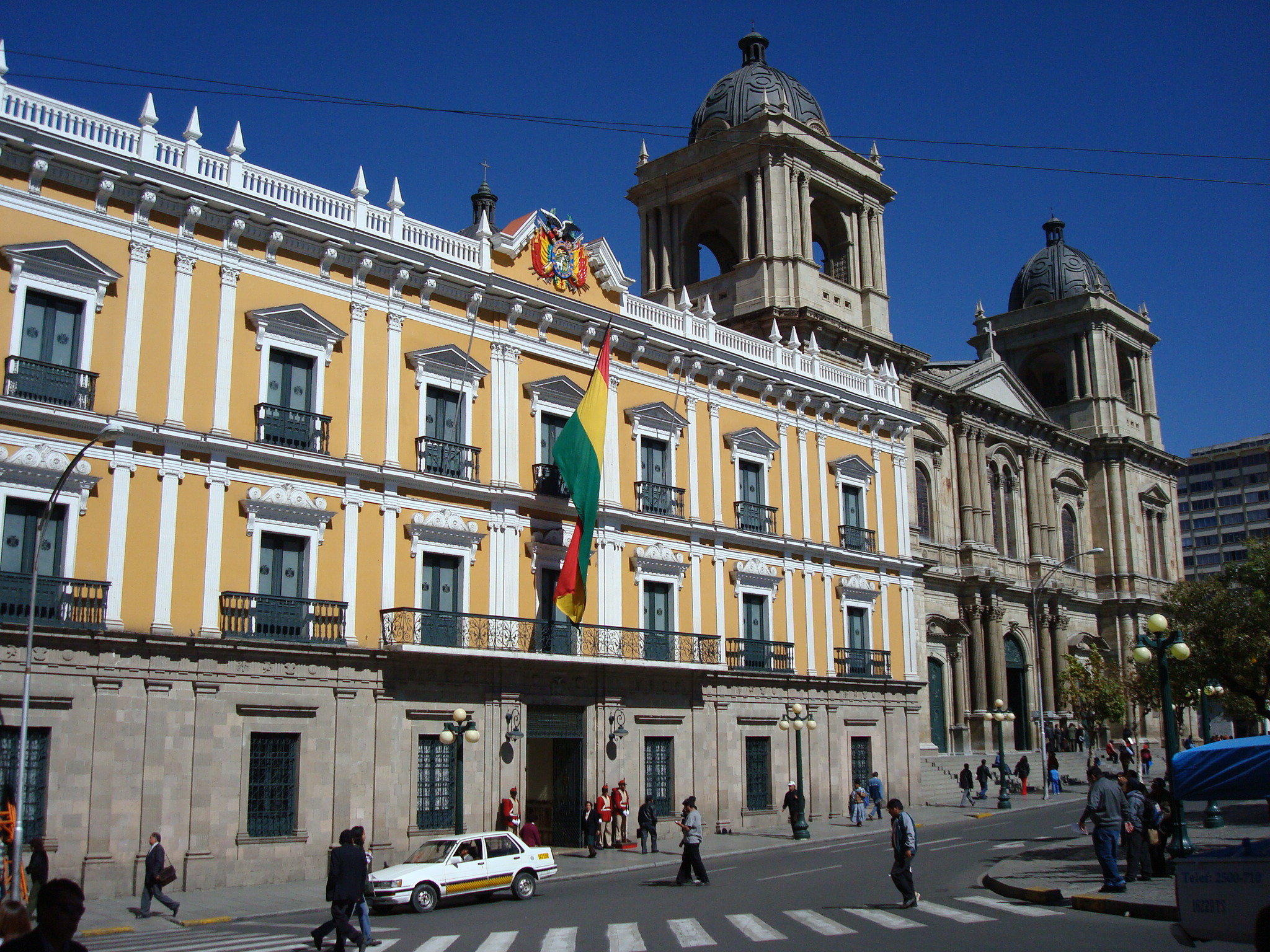
Palacio Quemado

- Casa Grande del Pueblo (President)
- Palacio Quemado (President's office)
- Palace of Calacoto (Official residence of the President)
- Castillo blanco (Winter residence of the President)
- Principado de la Glorieta (Summer residence of the President)
- Villa Albina (Summer residence of the President)
- Mercado street (Office prime minister)
- Casa Verde (Official residence of the prime minister)

==== Brazil ====
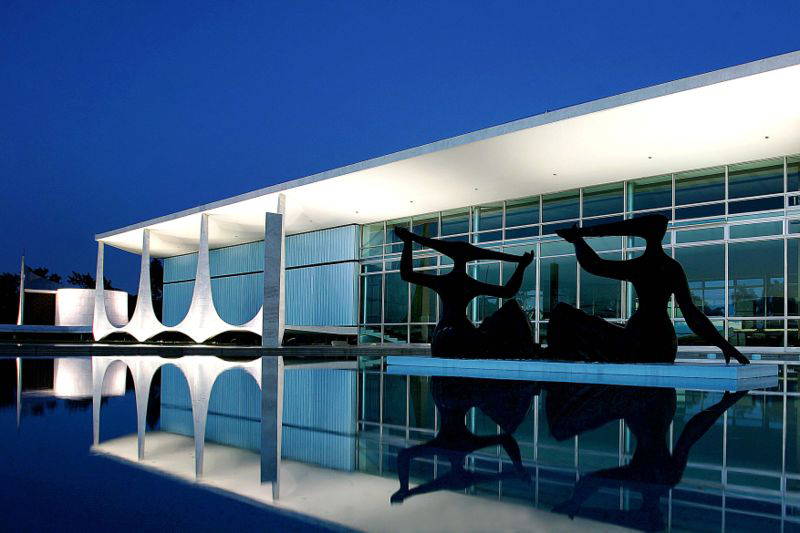
Palácio da Alvorada, Brasília

- Palácio do Planalto (Presidential office)
- Palácio da Alvorada (Presidential residence)
- Granja do Torto (President, retreat)
- Palácio Rio Negro (President, retreat)
- Palácio do Jaburu (Vice President)

===== Former =====
- Catete Palace (President, formerly; kept as Museu da República)
- Palace of São Cristóvão (King and Emperor, formerly; kept as the National Museum of Brazil)
- Palácio Imperial de Petrópolis (Emperor, summer residence, formerly; kept as Imperial Museum of Brazil)

===== State =====
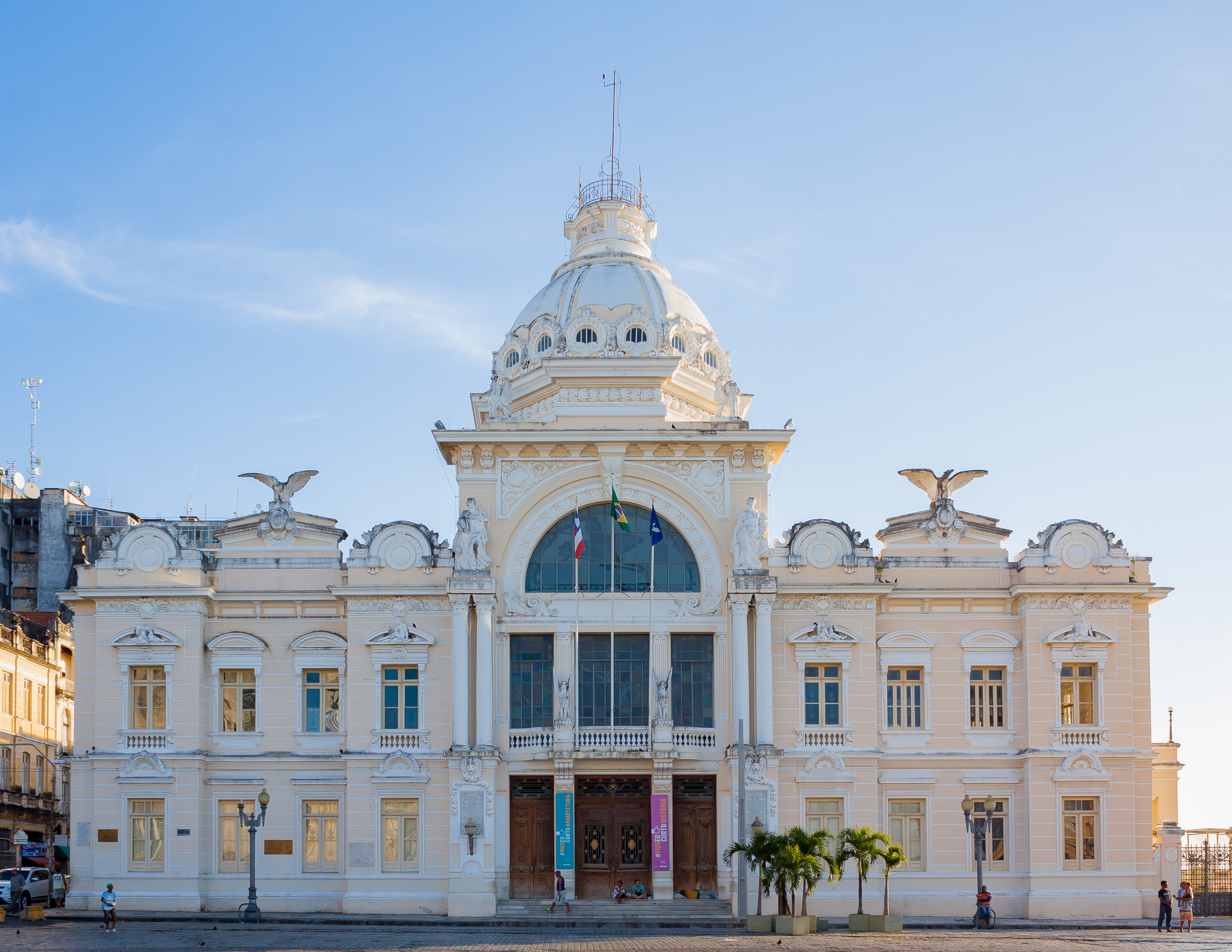
Palácio Rio Branco, Salvador, Bahia

- Bahia
  - Palácio de Ondina
  - Palácio da Aclamação (former)
  - Palácio Rio Branco (former)
- Federal District
  - Palácio do Buriti
- Maranhão
  - Palácio dos Leões
- Minas Gerais
  - Cidade Administrativa de Minas Gerais
- Paraná
  - Palácio Iguaçu
- Pernambuco
  - Palácio do Campo das Princesas
- Rio de Janeiro
  - Palácio das Laranjeiras
- Rio Grande do Sul
  - Palácio Piratini
- São Paulo
  - Palácio dos Bandeirantes

==== Chile ====
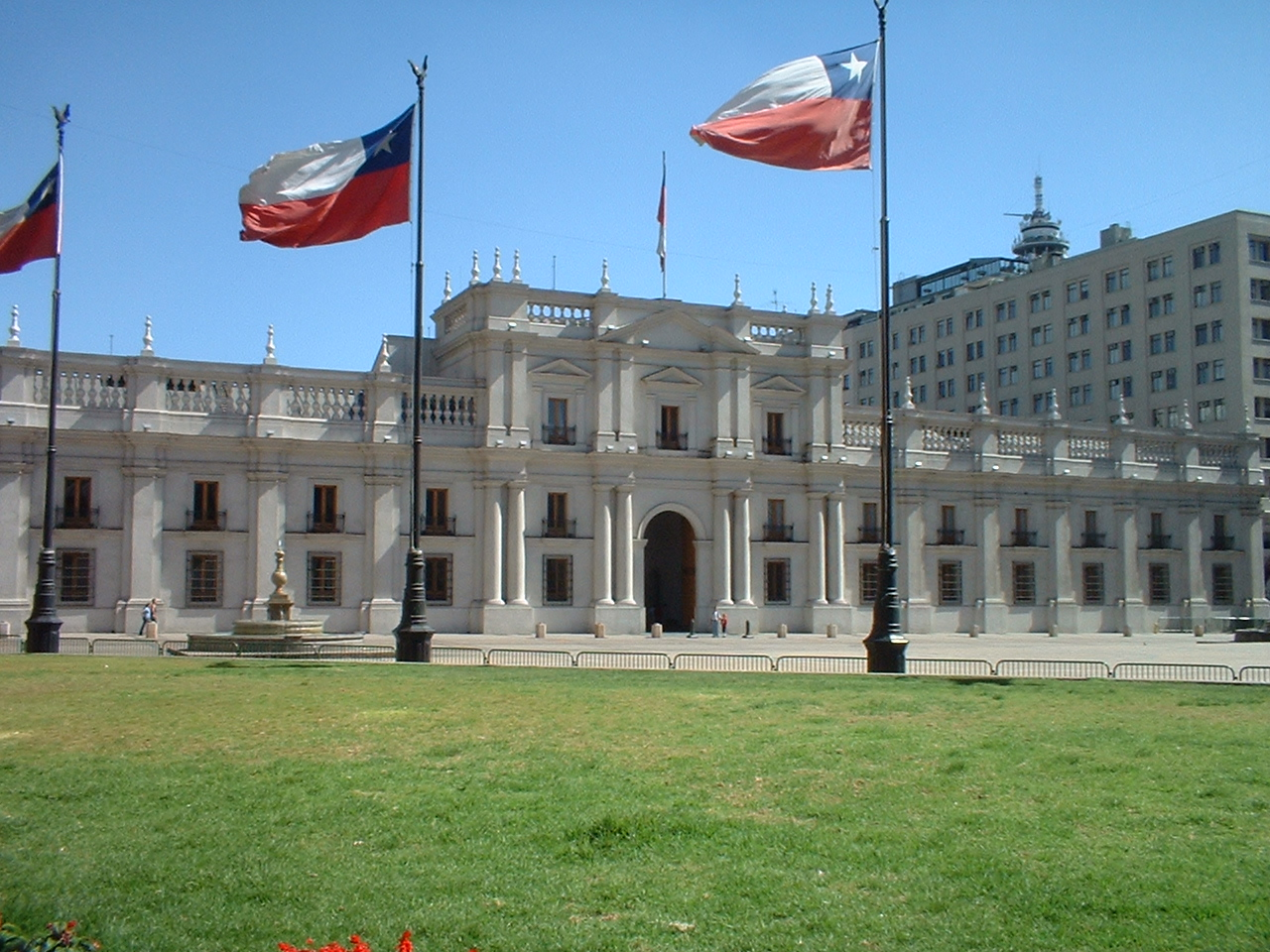
Palacio de La Moneda, Santiago

- None. The President uses own private residence.
- Presidential Palace of Cerro Castillo, Viña del Mar (President, retreat)

===== Former =====
- Palacio de La Moneda (President, formerly; kept as office for president)

==== Colombia ====
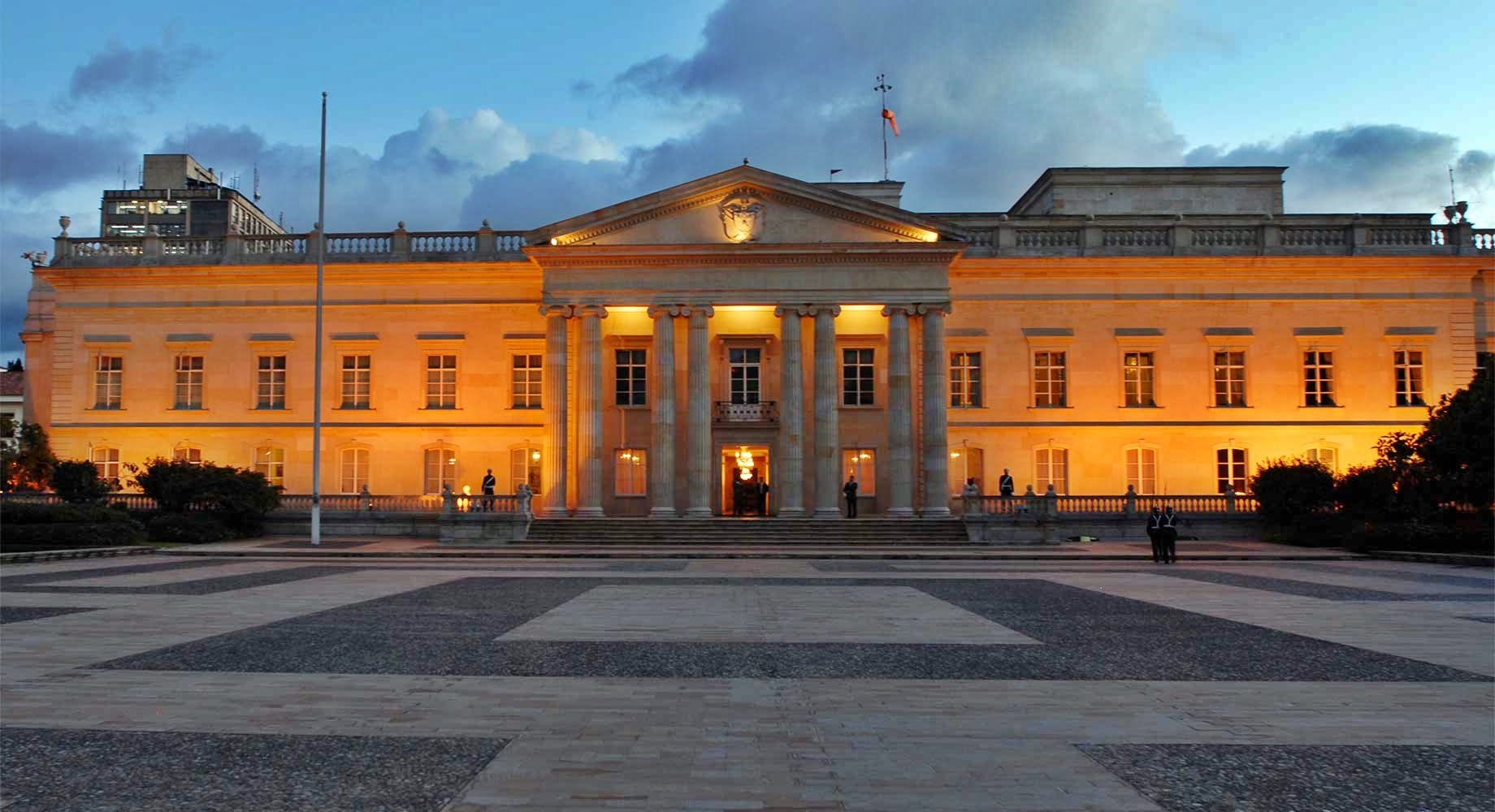
Casa de Nariño, Bogotá

- Casa de Nariño (President)
- Hacienda Hato Grande (President, retreat)
- Casa de Huéspedes Ilustres (President, summer retreat) Cartagena

==== Ecuador ====
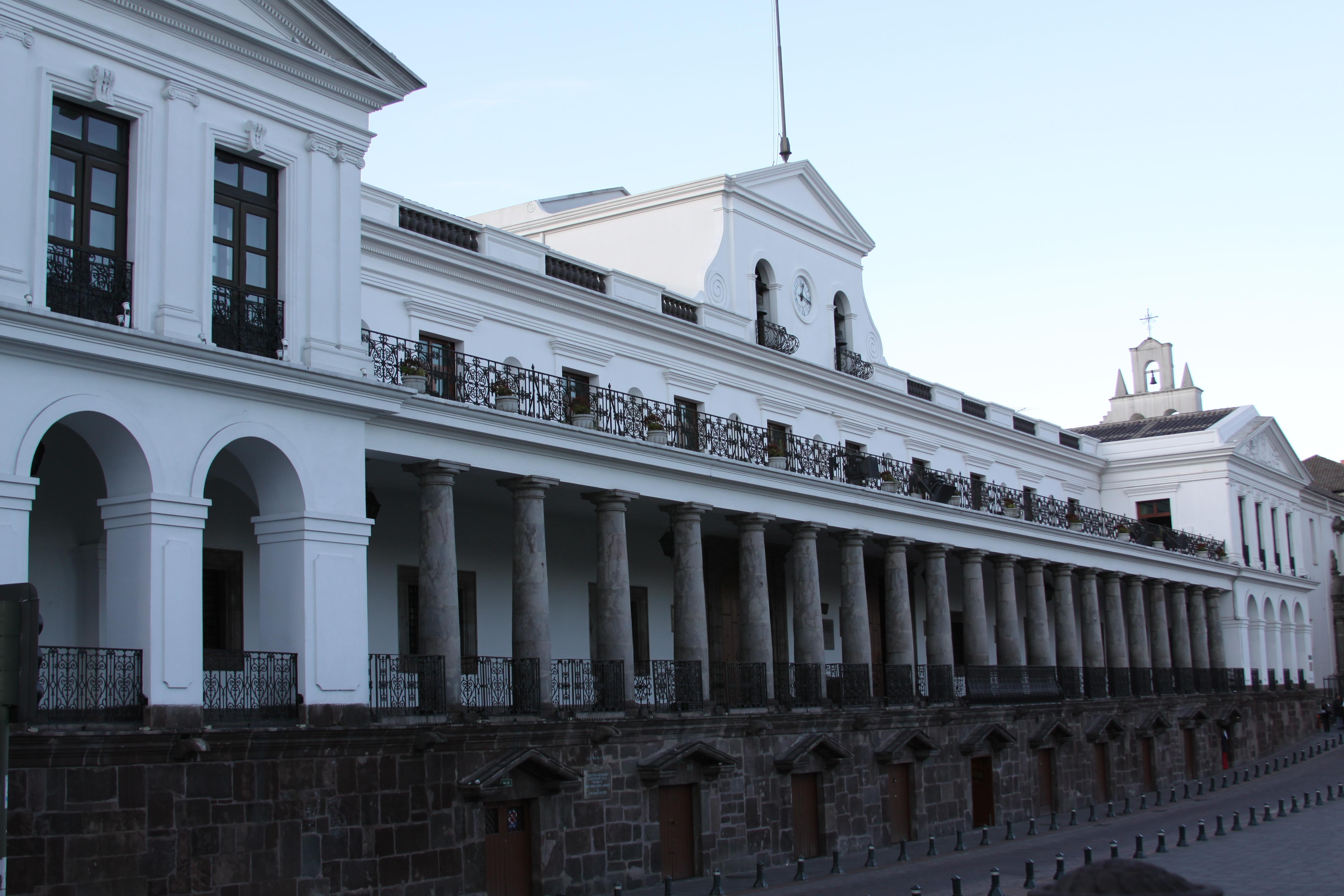
Palacio de Carondelet

- Palacio de Carondelet (President)

==== El Salvador ====
- Casa Presidencial, also called Casa Blanca (President)

==== Guyana ====
- State House (President)

==== Paraguay ====
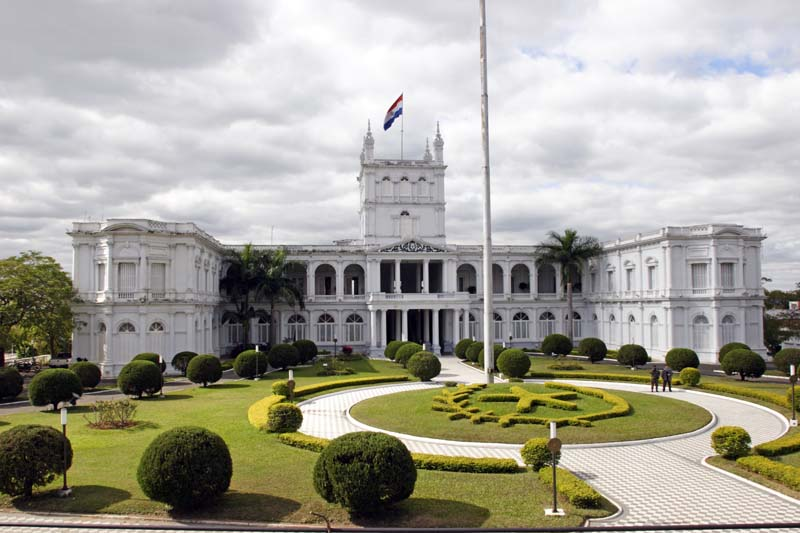
Palacio de los López

- Mburuvichá Roga (President)
- Palacio de los López (Presidential office)

==== Peru ====
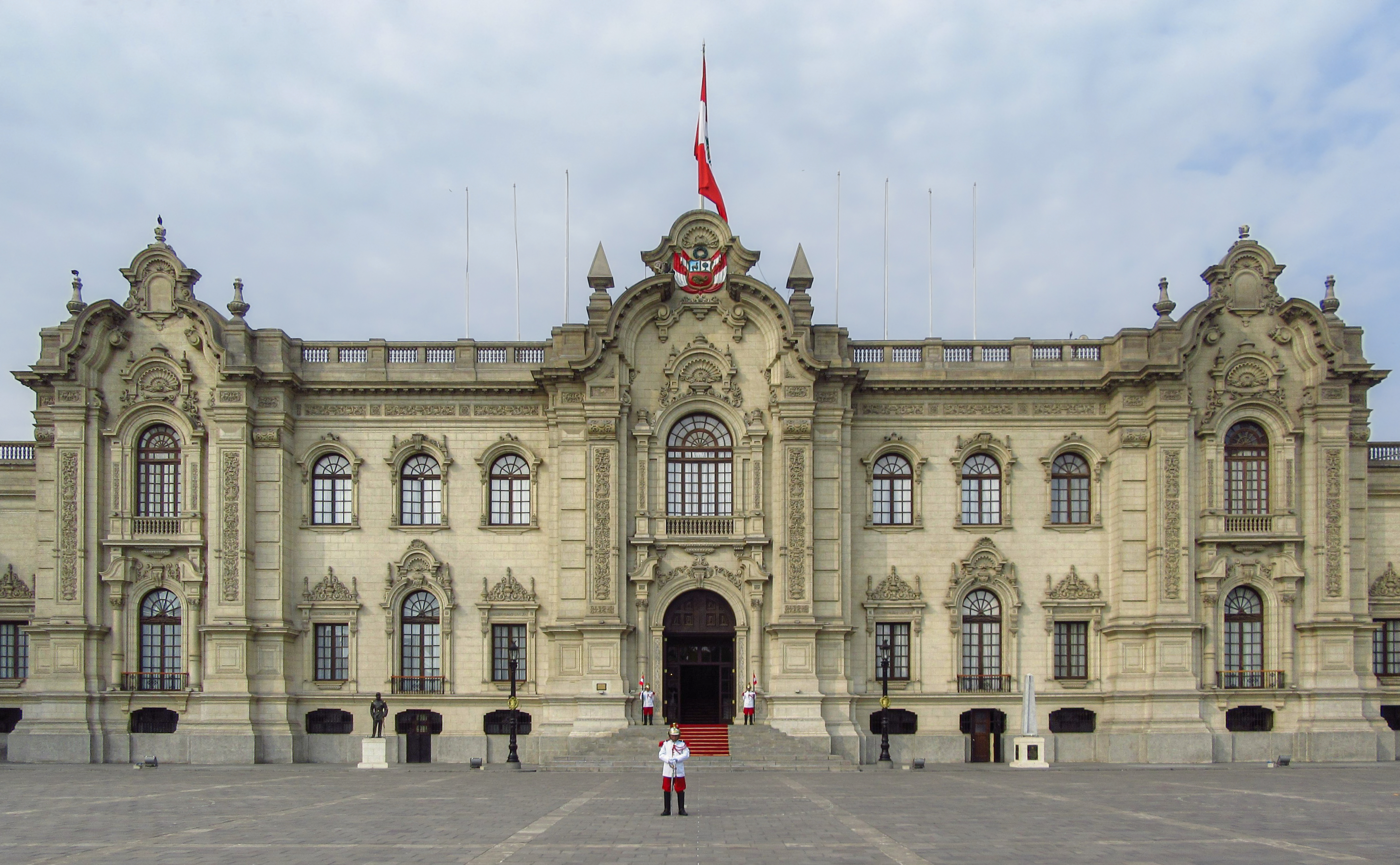
Palacio de Gobierno, Lima

- Palacio de Gobierno (President)

==== Suriname ====
- Gouvernementsgebouw, better known as Presidential Palace

==== Uruguay ====
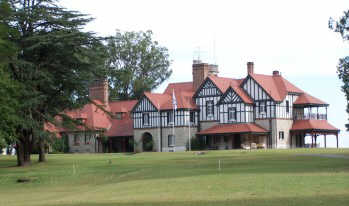
Parque Anchorena, Uruguay

- Palacio Estévez (former Presidential office, now protocolar building)
- Torre Ejecutiva (Presidential office)
- Suarez Residence (Presidential residence)
- Parque Anchorena (Presidential summer residence)
- Residencia de Punta del Este (Presidential summer residence)

==== Venezuela ====
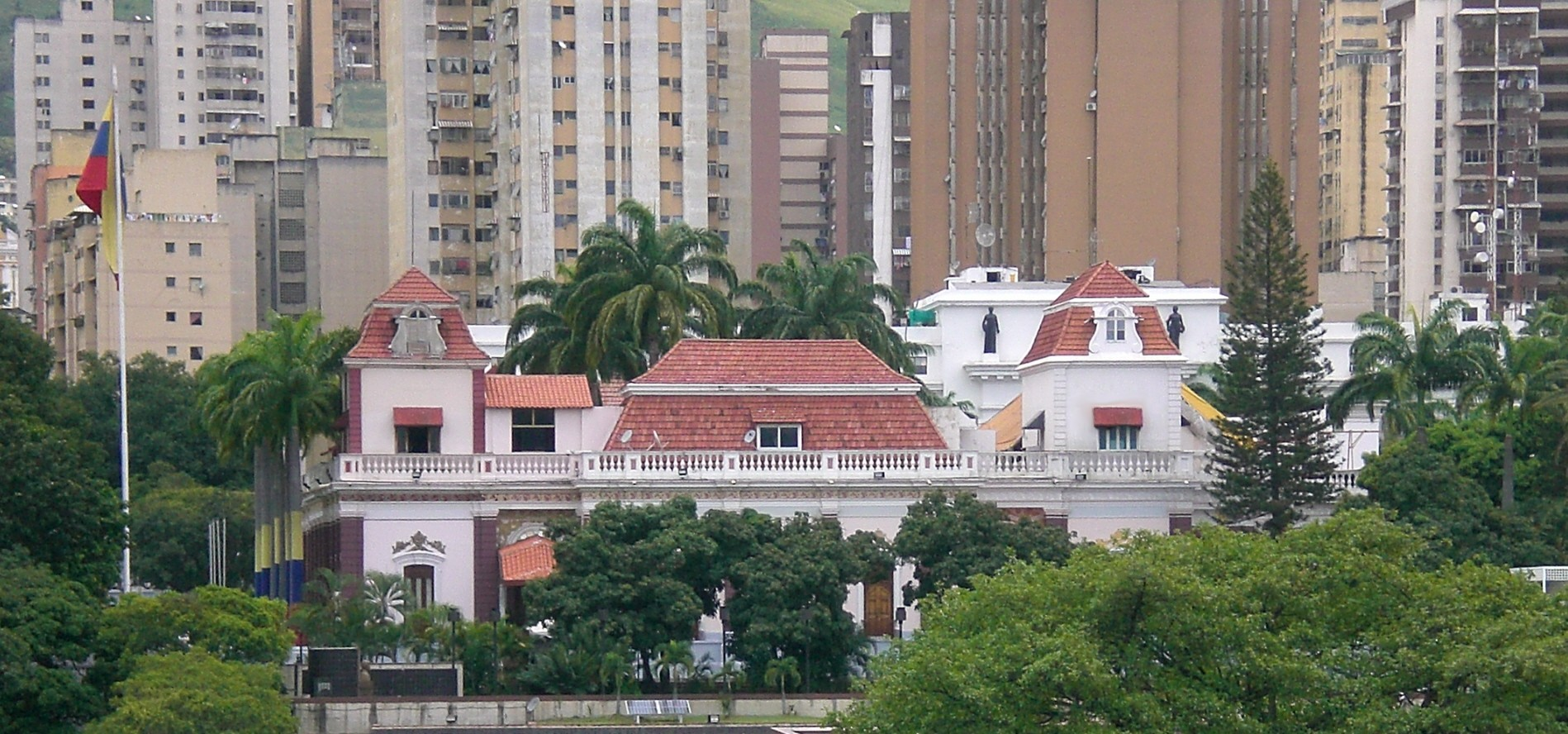
Miraflores Palace

- Palacio de Miraflores (President)
- La Casona (Presidential residence)
- La Guzmania (former Vacation Residence)
- La Viñeta, Fort Tiuna (Vice President; de facto President)

=== Oceania ===
==== Australia ====
===== Federal =====
- Government House (King and the Governor-General)
- Admiralty House (King and the Governor-General, Sydney residence)
- The Lodge (Prime Minister)
- Kirribilli House (Prime Minister, Sydney residence)

===== State =====
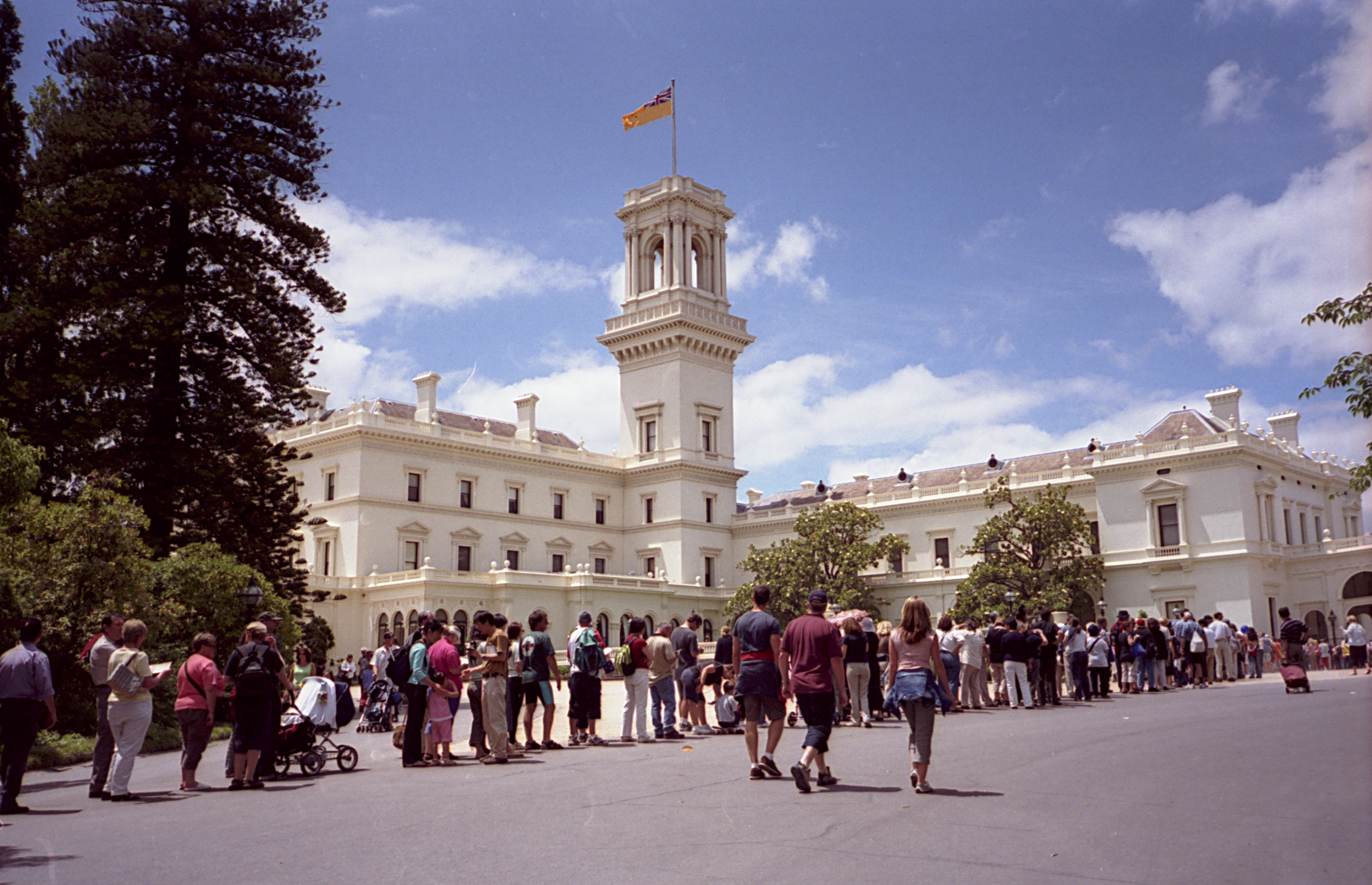
Government House, Melbourne

- New South Wales:
  Government House (Governor)
- Queensland:
  Government House (Governor)
- South Australia:
  Government House (Governor)
- Tasmania:
  Government House (Governor)
- Victoria:
  Government House (Governor)
- Western Australia:
  Government House (Governor)

===== Territorial =====
====== Internal territory ======
- Northern Territory:
  Government House (Administrator)

====== External territories ======
- Christmas Island:
  Government House (Administrator)
- Cocos (Keeling) Islands:
  Government House (Administrator)
- Norfolk Island:
  Government House (Administrator)

====== State, former ======
- New South Wales
  Old Government House (Governor country residence at Parramatta (1790–1855) formerly)
  Hillview, (Governor summer residence at Sutton Forest (1882–1958), formerly)
  Cranbrook, Bellevue Hill, (Governor residence 1901–1917, formerly)
- Queensland
  Adelaide House, (Governor residence (1859–1862) formerly; now The Deanery of St. John's Anglican Cathedral
  Old Government House (Governor residence (1862–1909) formerly; kept as headquarters of the National Trust of Australia)
- South Australia
  Old Government House (Governor summer residence (1860–1880), formerly)
  Marble Hill (Governor summer residence (1880–1955), formerly; destroyed in the Black Sunday Bushfire of 1955)
- Victoria
  La Trobe's Cottage (Lieutenant Governor, residence (1840–1854) formerly; kept as museum)
  Toorak House (Governor residence (1854–1874), formerly; currently being used as a church)
  Bishopscourt (Governor residence (1874–1876), formerly)
  Stonnington Mansion (Governor residence (1901–1931) formerly; currently being restored as private home)
- Tasmania
  Old Government House (Governor's residence (1807–1857, demolished 1858)

==== Fiji ====
- Government House (President)

==== Nauru ====
- State House (President; formerly kept as immigration detention center)

==== New Zealand ====
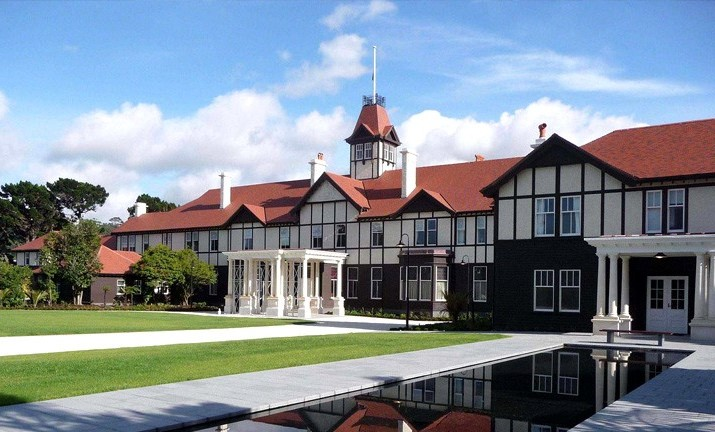
Government House, Wellington

- Government House (Governor-General)
- Government House (Governor-General, Auckland residence)
- Premier House (Prime Minister)

===== Former =====
- Old Government House, Auckland

===== Realm =====
- Cook Islands: Government House (Queen's Representative)
- Tokelau: Government House (Administrator)

==== Papua New Guinea ====
- Government House (Governor-General)

==== Samoa ====
- Government House (Head of State)

===== Former =====
- Villa Vailima

==== Solomon Islands ====
- Government House (Governor-General)

==== Tonga ====
- Royal Palace (King)

==== Tuvalu ====
- Government House (Governor General)

==== Vanuatu ====
- State House (President)

== International organizations ==
=== Caribbean Community ===
==== Former ====
- Colgrain House, Camp Street, Georgetown (former residence of the Secretary-General of the Caribbean Community, 1968–2011)

=== Commonwealth of Nations ===
- The Garden House, 40B Hill Street, Mayfair, London (residence of the Commonwealth Secretary-General)

=== International Olympic Committee ===
- Château de Vidy, 11 Rue de Vidy, Lausanne (former residence of the President of the International Olympic Committee; currently being kept for office functions)
- Lausanne Palace, Lausanne (residence of the President of the International Olympic Committee)

=== United Nations ===
- 3 Sutton Place, Manhattan, New York City (residence of the Secretary-General of the United Nations)

== See also ==
- Air transports of heads of state and government
- Castle
- List of palaces
- Palace
- Presidential palace
