= List of gubernatorial residences in the United States =

This is a list of current and former official residences of governors in the United States. Most U.S. States have at least one official residence, the exceptions are five states; Arizona, Idaho, Massachusetts, Vermont and Rhode Island. The official residences include private homes that were bequeathed or sold by private citizens to state governments, as well as buildings that were constructed specifically for the governor. The California Governor's Mansion was originally vacated in 1967, but returned to regular use from 2015 to 2019. Other states have unofficial residences used by their governors.

^{*}	Current official residence
^{†}	Listed on the National Register of Historic Places (NRHP)
^{††}	NRHP-listed and also designated as a National Historic Landmark

== Current and former official residences ==
State	Residence	Image	Location	Dates of use	Notes
Alabama	Governor's Mansion^{*}		1142 South Perry Street, Montgomery; 32°21′43″N 86°18′26″W	1951–present	Classical Revival Built 1907, known as Robert Ligon Jr. House; began use as Governor's Mansion, 1951; Added to National Register of Historic Places, 1972
Alabama	First residence		South Perry and South Sts., Montgomery	1911–1950	A Beaux Arts brownstone built in 1906, which the state purchased for $46,500. Demolished in 1963.
Alabama	Governor George Smith Houston House		101 N. Houston St., Athens; 34°48′22″N 86°58′41″W		NRHP-listed
Alaska	Governor's Mansion^{*}		716 Calhoun Avenue, Juneau; 58°18′10″N 134°24′54″W	1912–present	Completed and first occupied, 1912; Added to National Register of Historic Places, 1976
Arizona	None currently				
Arizona	Old Governor's Mansion		400 block of W. Gurley, Prescott; 34°32′29″N 112°28′23″W		Built 1864; now part of Sharlot Hall Museum; Added to National Register of Historic Places, 1971
Arkansas	Governor's Mansion^{*}		1800 Center Street, Little Rock; 34°43′54.83″N 92°16′33.57″W	1950–present	First and only official residence in Arkansas. Construction began in December 1947; officially opened on January 10, 1950; first occupied on February 3, 1950. Included within Governor's Mansion Historic District which was NRHP-listed in 1978.
California	Historic Governor's Mansion of California		1526 H Street, Sacramento; 38°34′48.52″N 121°29′1.25″W	1903–1967, 2015–2019	Built in 1877; purchased by state in 1903. Now part of Governor's Mansion State Historic Park, a state park Added to National Register of Historic Places, 1970; California Historical Landmark, 1974
Colorado	Governor's Mansion^{*} (Governor's Residence at the Boettcher Mansion)		400 East 8th Avenue, Denver; 39°43′43″N 104°58′53″W	1960–present	Built in 1908, accepted as gift to the state in 1959; Restored in the 1980s Added to National Register of Historic Places, 1969. Colonial Revival.
Connecticut	Governor's Residence^{*}		990 Prospect Avenue, Hartford; 41°46′43″N 72°42′48″W	1945–present	Built in 1909; acquired by state in 1943; served as governor's residence since 1945. Georgian Revival; a contributing property in an NRHP historic district
Delaware	Governor's Mansion^{*}		151 Kings Highway, Dover; 39°9′41″N 75°31′25″W	1965–present	Also known as Woodburn. Built c. 1798 in Georgian style; purchased by state for use as governor's residence in 1965. NRHP-listed in 1972
Florida	Governor's Mansion^{*} (The People's House of Florida)		700 North Adams Street, Tallahassee; 30°26′59″N 84°16′57″W	1907–1955; 1957–present	Funds for mansion appropriated by Legislature in 1905; completed in Colonial Revival style in 1907; Funds for new mansion appropriated after original mansion determined to be structurally unsound in 1952; funds for new mansion appropriated by Legislature in 1953; Plans for new mansion approved and old mansion demolished, 1955; New mansion completed, 1956; re-occupied by governor, spring 1957; expanded, 2005; Added to National Register of Historic Places, 2006
Georgia	Governor's Mansion^{*}		391 West Paces Ferry Road NW, Atlanta	1968–present	Built 1967 in Greek Revival style, heavily damaged by tornado and renovated soon thereafter, 1975.
Georgia	Old Governor's Mansion (Milledgeville, Georgia)		120 S. Clark St., Milledgeville, Georgia; 33°4′42″N 83°13′53″W	1838–1868	NRHP-listed, in original state capital in Milledgeville, occupied 1838–1868 and still open today for public tours.
Georgia				1868–1870	Unofficial three story, 14-room Charles A. Larenden on east side of Peachtree Street in Atlanta occupied 1868-1870
Georgia	Third Georgia Governor's Mansion		Cain Street and Peachtree Street, Atlanta	1870–1921	First official mansion in Atlanta, previously owned by Mayor John H. James, purchased in 1870, occupied by 17 governors; vacated, 1921; demolished, 1923.
Georgia	The Prado		In Ansley Park	1925–1968	Granite estate of Edwin P. Ansley, acquired by state in 1925; occupied by 11 governors; vacated and demolished in 1968
Georgia	Governor L. G. Hardman House		Commerce	1927-1931	NRHP-listed.
Hawaii	Hale Kia Aina*			2002–present	
Hawaii	Washington Place^{††}		320 Beretania Street, Honolulu	1918–present	Built 1847 in Greek Revival style; used as palace of Liliuokalani; site of Overthrow of the Kingdom of Hawaii, 1893; became Executive Mansion, 1918; Remodeled, 1922; vacated and became historic house museum, 2002; Added to National Register of Historic Places, 1972; designated National Historic Landmark, 2007
Idaho	None currently				
Idaho	Idaho House		4000 Simplot Lane, Boise	2009–2013	Built in 1979; donated to state by J. R. Simplot in November 2005; never occupied by a governor; demolished in January 2016.
Idaho	Pierce House		1805 N. 21st Street, Boise	1947–1989	
Illinois	Governor's Mansion*^{†}		410 East Jackson Street, Springfield; 39°47′47.85″N 89°38′59.86″W	1855–present	Completed in 1855 in Italianate style; one of the oldest continuously occupied governor's mansions in the United States; It is also the largest Governor's Residence in the country at 45,000 square feet; Governor and family generally live in a seven-room private apartment behind the mansion; mansion itself mainly maintained as historic site and use for state functions Added to National Register of Historic Places, 1976
Indiana	Governor's Residence*		4750 North Meridian Street, Indianapolis	1973–present	English Tudor Revival style; built in 1924, purchased by state in 1973.
Indiana	Grouseland^{††}		Vincennes, Indiana; 38°41′7.76″N 87°31′33.62″W		Built 1804 in Federal style, for William Henry Harrison in Vincennes, Indiana, during his term as Governor of the Indiana Territory. Designated a National Historic Landmark in 1960
Iowa	Terrace Hill*^{††}		2300 Grand Avenue, Des Moines41°35′0″N 93°38′56″W	1976–present	Construction of current mansion began in 1866; completed in Second Empire style in 1869; donated to state by Hubbell family and first occupied by governor in 1976. Added to National Register of Historic Places, 1972; designated National Historic Landmark, 2003.
Iowa	Witmer House		2900 Grand Avenue, Des Moines	1947–1976	Purchased in 1947.
Kansas	Cedar Crest*		1 SW Cedar Crest Road, Topeka	1962–present	Built in 1928 in country French chateau style. Bequeathed to state in 1955; first occupied by governor, 1962; Added to National Register of Historic Places, 1982.
Kansas	Original official residence		801 Buchanan Street, Topeka	1901–1962	Original official residence, built in 1887 and purchased by state in 1901; auctioned off in 1963 and demolished in 1964.
Kansas	Governor L. D. Lewelling House		1245 N. Broadway, Wichita	1893-1895	NRHP-listed in Sedgwick County
Kentucky	Governor's Mansion*		East lawn of the Capitol at end of Capital Avenue, Frankfort; 38°11′14″N 84°52′25″W		Built 1912–1914 in Beaux-Arts style to replace old governor's mansion; used as executive residence since. NRHP-listed in 1972
Kentucky	Old Governor's Mansion		420 High St., Frankfort; 38°11′58″N 84°52′26″W		Referred to as "the Palace" in early years Funds appropriated by Kentucky General Assembly in 1796; completed in 1798. Replaced by current Governor's Mansion but continued to be used as official residence of Lieutenant Governor of Kentucky, though not used by past three lieutenant governors. Asserted to be the oldest official executive residence officially still in use in the United States. Added to National Register of Historic Places, 1971
Louisiana	Governor's Mansion*		1001 Capitol Access Road, Baton Rouge; 30°27′32″N 91°10′50″W	1963–present	Greek Revival (with some Colonial Revival features)
Louisiana	Old Governor's Mansion		502 North Boulevard, Baton Rouge; 30°26′47″N 91°11′6″W	1930–1961	After 1961 site of Louisiana Arts and Science Center Museum, 1964–1976; reopened as historic house museum, 1978; Added to National Register of Historic Places, 1975
Louisiana	Mouton House		261 North Liberty Street, Opelousas	1862–1863	Built in 1850 for former Lt. Governor Charles Homer Mouton. During the height of the Civil War from 1862 to 1863, the home served as the Governor's Mansion for Governor Thomas Overton Moore when the State Capitol was moved to Opelousas from Baton Rouge. Added to National Register of Historic Places, 1991
Maine	The Blaine House*^{††}		Capitol and State Sts., Augusta; 44°18′28.38″N 69°46′53″W	1919–present	Built 1833; purchased by James G. Blaine in 1862; donated by Blaine's youngest daughter to the state and established as official residence by Legislature in 1919. Added to National Register of Historic Places, 1969; Designated National Historic Landmark, 1964
Maryland	Government House*		State Circle, Annapolis	1870–present	
Maryland	Jennings House			1777–1870	Demolished in 1901.
Massachusetts	None currently				
Massachusetts	Province House	Province House, Boston	Marlborough Street, Boston,	After 1716	Used for Governors of Massachusetts Bay Colony; burned 1864, torn down 1922
Michigan	Governor's Mansion*		Moore River Drive estates, Lansing	1969–present	Designed by American architect Wallace Frost and built in 1957 as a private residence, the mansion in Lansing was donated to the state in 1969 and is maintained with private funds. The mansion was renovated under Governor Jennifer Granholm and is 8,700 sq ft (810 m^{2}).
Michigan	Michigan Governor's Summer Residence		Mackinac Island	1945–present	Built in 1902, the Governor's summer residence on Mackinac Island is a three-story structure located on a bluff overlooking the Straits of Mackinac. It was originally built as a private residence for Chicago attorney Lawrence Andrew Young and later owned by the Hugo Scherer family of Detroit. In 1944, the Mackinac Island State Park Commission purchased the home for its original cost of $15,000. NRHP-listed in 1997.
Michigan	Governor's Mansion (Marshall, Michigan)		621 S. Marshall Ave., Marshall; 42°15′54″N 84°57′16″W		Built in Greek Revival style in 1839; NRHP-listed in Calhoun County
Minnesota	Governor's Residence*		1006 Summit Avenue, Saint Paul; 44°56′27.77″N 93°8′34.44″W	1965–present	
Mississippi	Governor's Mansion*^{††}		316 East Capitol Street, Jackson; 32°17′59.77″N 90°11′0.01″W	1842–present	Built between 1839 and 1842 with funds appropriated by the state legislature. Occupied by Mississippi's governors since 1842, making it the nation's second-oldest continually-used gubernatorial mansion. Designed by architect William Nichols (1780-1853), the mansion is considered to be one of the nation's finest examples of Greek Revival architecture. Added to National Register of Historic Places, 1969; designated National Historic Landmark, 1975; Designated Mississippi Landmark, 1986
Missouri	Governor's Mansion*		100 Madison Street, Jefferson City; 38°34′40″N 92°10′10″W	1871–present	Added to National Register of Historic Places, 1969
Montana	Governor’s Residence*		2 Carson Street, Helena	1959–	
Montana	Hauser Mansion		720 Madison Avenue, Helena	2024-	
Montana	Former Montana Executive Mansion		6th Ave. and Ewing St., Helena; 46°35′16″N 112°2′3″W	1913–1959	Queen Anne style house designed by Cass Gilbert
Nebraska	Governor's Mansion*		1425 H Street, Lincoln; 40°48′23″N 96°42′1″W	1958–present	Added to National Register of Historic Places, 2008
Nevada	Governor's Mansion*		606 Mountain Street, Carson City; 39°10′3″N 119°46′23″W	1909–present	Added to National Register of Historic Places, 1976
New Hampshire	Governor's Mansion* (Bridges House)		21 Mountain Road, Concord; 43°14′20″N 71°32′16″W	1969–present	Added to National Register of Historic Places, 2005
New Jersey	Drumthwacket*†		354 Stockton Road, Princeton; 40°20′21.57″N 74°40′29.36″W	1982–present	Added to National Register of Historic Places, 1975
New Jersey	Governor's Ocean House		Island Beach State Park, Berkeley Township; 39°53′11″N 74°4′54″W	1953–present	Cape Cod Colonial Revival; Formerly known as "Ocean House," one of three houses built for a planned resort development by Henry Phipps Jr. Built circa 1927, bought by the State of New Jersey in 1953.
New Jersey	Morven†		55 Stockton Street, Princeton; 40°20′50.97″N 74°40′1.03″W	1954–1981	Officially known as Morven Museum & Garden. Built 1730. Added to National Register of Historic Places, 1971
New Mexico	Governor's Mansion*		1 Mansion Drive, Santa Fe	1954–present	Modified Territorial
New Mexico	Previous mansion			1909?–1954	
New Mexico	Palace of the Governors		105 W Palace Ave, Santa Fe	1610–1909	
New York	State Executive Mansion*†		138 Eagle Street, Albany; 42°38′48″N 73°45′41″W	1875–present	Queen Anne; Added to National Register of Historic Places, 1971
North Carolina	Executive Mansion*†		35°46′59″N 78°38′7″W	1891–present	Queen Anne; Added to National Register of Historic Places, 1970
North Carolina	Governor's Western Residence		45 Patton Mountain Rd., Asheville	1964–present	
North Carolina	Governor's Palace		Raleigh, North Carolina	1816–1865	Demolished in 1885
North Dakota	Governor's Residence*		Bismarck; 46°49′3″N 100°47′5.85″W	2018–present	
North Dakota	Former Governor's Residence (demolished)		Bismarck	1960–2018	
North Dakota	Former North Dakota Executive Mansion		320 Ave. B., E., in Bismarck; 46°48′40″N 100°47′10″W	1893–1960	
Ohio	Governor's Mansion* (Malcolm Jeffrey House)		358 N. Parkview, Bexley; 39°58′35″N 82°56′25″W	1957–present	Built 1923–25. Tudor Revival/Jacobethan Revival.
Ohio	Old Governor's Mansion		1234 East Broad Street, Columbus; 39°57′59″N 82°58′6″W		Also known as Ohio Archives Building or as Charles H. Lindenberg Home, built 1904. NRHP-listed in 1972
Oklahoma	Governor's Mansion*		820 NE 23rd Street, Oklahoma City	1928–present	Dutch Colonial Revival
Oregon	Mahonia Hall* (Thomas and Edna Livesley Mansion)		533 Lincoln Street South, Salem		Built 1924 in Tudor Revival style, acquired by state in 1988 with private donations. NRHP-listed in 1990
Pennsylvania	Governor's Residence*		2035 North Front Street, Harrisburg; 40°16′39″N 76°53′55″W	1969–present	Colonial Revival
Puerto Rico	Palacio de Santa Catalina*^{††} (Palace of Saint Catherine)		Old San Juan; 18°27′50″N 66°7′9″W	1533–present	The Palacio de Santa Catalina (Santa Catalina Palace), most commonly known as La Fortaleza or "The Fortress" is the oldest continuously used government building in the Americas, originally built as a fort between 1533 and 1540, it has been expanded and renovated several times to give it palatial functions and characteristics.
Rhode Island	None currently				
South Carolina	Governor's Mansion*†		800 Richland Street, Columbia; 34°0′28″N 81°2′37″W	1868–present	NRHP-listed in 1970
South Dakota	Governor's Mansion*		119 North Washington Avenue, Pierre	2005–present	
South Dakota	Governor William J. Bulow House†		Beresford		NRHP-listed, in Union County
South Dakota	Governor Leslie Jensen House†		Hot Springs; 43°25′46″N 103°28′12″W		NRHP-listed, in Fall River County
South Dakota	Governor John L. Pennington House†		Yankton; 42°52′12″N 97°23′8″W		NRHP-listed, in Yankton County
Tennessee	Governor's Mansion*	Tennessee Residence	Oak Hill	1949–present	Three-story Georgian-style mansion that was built as a private home for William Ridley Wills and his family in 1929.
Texas	Governor's Mansion*^{††}		1010 Colorado St., Austin; 30°16′21.72″N 97°44′34.79″W	1856–present	Built in 1855; home of every governor since 1856. NRHP-listed in 1970; designated National Historic Landmark in 1974
Texas	Spanish Governor's Palace		San Antonio; 29°25′30″N 98°29′40″W		Built c. 1722; NRHP-listed
Utah	Governor's Mansion^{*†}		603 East South Temple Street, Salt Lake City; 40°46′11″N 111°52′23″W		Built in 1902; donated to state to serve as governor's mansion in February 1937, NRHP-listed in 1970
Vermont	None currently				
Virginia	Executive Mansion*^{††}		Capitol Square, Richmond; 37°32′19″N 77°25′57″W	1813–present	Built 1811 in Federal style. NRHP-listed in 1969; designated National Historic Landmark in 1988
Virginia	Governor's Palace		Duke of Gloucester Street, Williamsburg	1776–1780	Constructed over 16 years and completed in 1721; Home to seven governors; the last was Thomas Jefferson; Main building destroyed by fire, December 22, 1781; Surviving outbuildings demolished during the Civil War; Reconstructed Governor's Palace opened April 23, 1934
Washington	Governor's Mansion*		Olympia	1909–present	Built in 1908 in Colonial Revival.
West Virginia	Governor's Mansion*†		1716 Kanawha Boulevard, Charleston; 38°20′10″N 81°36′53″W	1925–present	Colonial Revival, NRHP-listed in 1974
Wisconsin	Governor's Mansion*		99 Cambridge Road, Maple Bluff	1949–present	Built in 1920 in Classical Revival style; sold to state in 1949
Wyoming	Governor's Mansion*		5001 Central Avenue, Cheyenne		Built in 1976 in Colonial Revival style
Wyoming	Old Governor's Mansion†		300 East 21st Street, Cheyenne; 41°8′13″N 104°48′53″W		Colonial Revival style, NRHP-listed in 1969

== See also ==
- List of residences of presidents of the United States
- List of university and college presidents' houses in the United States
