= Governor of South Dakota =

- Seal of South Dakota

- State flag

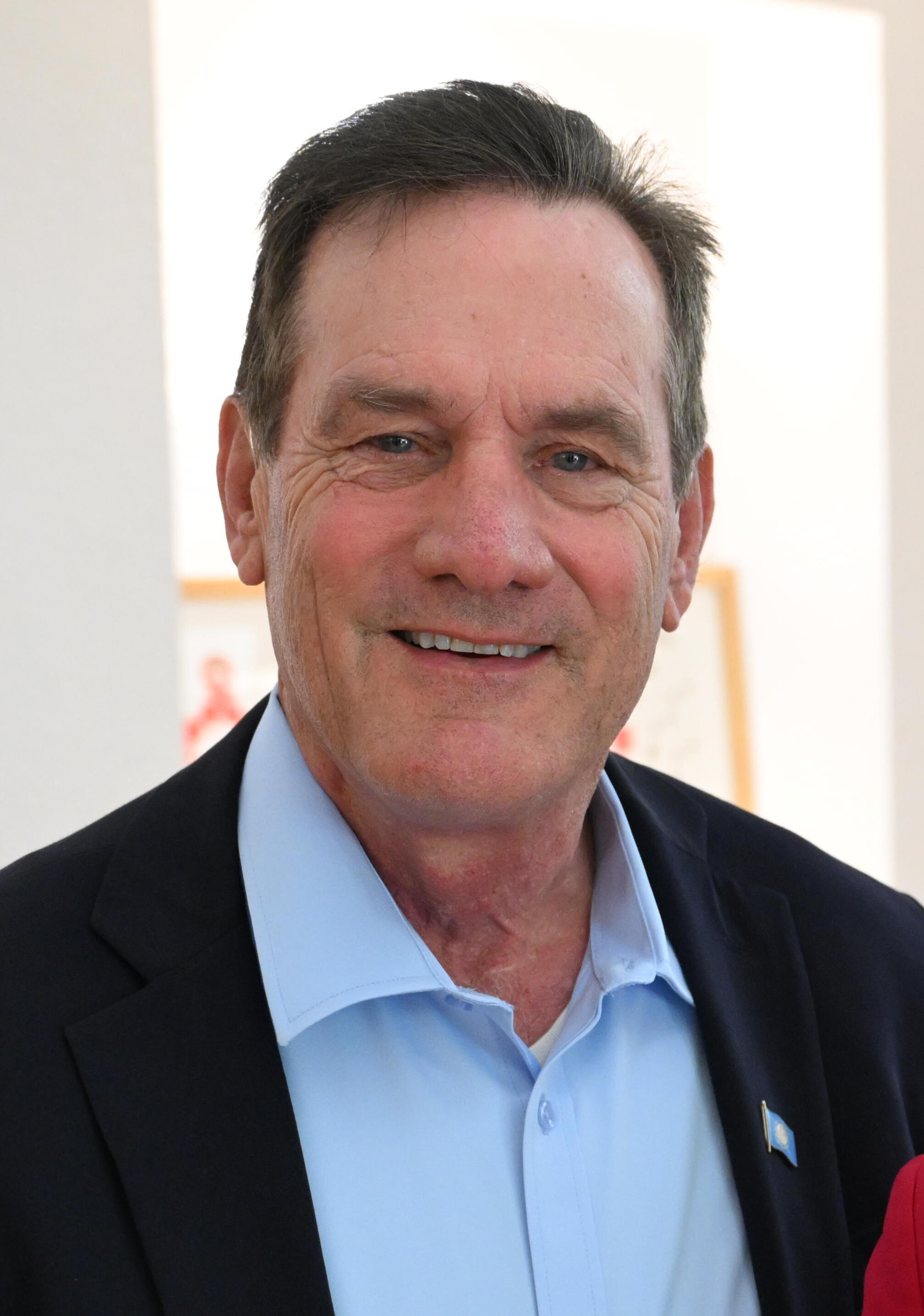
- Incumbent; Larry Rhoden since January 25, 2025
- Government of South Dakota
- Style: The Honorable
- Residence: The Governor's Mansion
- Term length: Four years, renewable once consecutively
- Inaugural holder: Arthur C. Mellette; 1889
- Formation: Constitution of South Dakota
- Succession: Line of succession
- Deputy: Lieutenant Governor of South Dakota
- Salary: $146,472.00
- Website: Official website

The governor of South Dakota is the head of government of South Dakota. The governor is elected to a four-year term in even years when there is no presidential election.

The current governor is Larry Rhoden, a member of the Republican Party who took office on January 25, 2025 upon Kristi Noem's resignation following her confirmation as Secretary of Homeland Security by the United States Senate.

== Qualifications ==
Anyone who seeks to be elected Governor of South Dakota must meet the following qualifications:

- Be a citizen of the United States
- Be at least 21 years old
- Be a resident of South Dakota for at least two years as of the election

== Powers and duties ==
The governor holds many powers and duties, which in many ways are similar to those held by the president of the United States:

- The governor serves as a spokesperson for the state, promoting business and economic development interests.
- The governor is actively involved in the legislative process; they may introduce legislation, and have the power to veto bills passed by the South Dakota Legislature (though vetoes may be overridden by a two-thirds vote of each house).
- The governor oversees the executive branch, and appoints the cabinet members. The governor also appoints the members of a wide array of state boards and commissions.
- The governor is the commander-in-chief of the South Dakota National Guard.
- The governor may grant pardons to those convicted of criminal offenses under state law.
- The governor fills vacancies that occur in the state legislature, the state judiciary, and other state constitutional offices. The governor also fills vacancies in United States Senate seats from South Dakota.
- The governor is the titular head of their political party.

== History ==
From 1889 to 1974, the governor served a 2-year term. Until the 1940s, the governor was allowed to serve unlimited terms; since that time, governors have been limited to 2 consecutive terms. The gubernatorial term was extended to 4 years in 1974. The governor and lieutenant governor run on a single ticket. The gubernatorial nominee must win a primary, whereas the lieutenant governor nominee is selected at a state party convention. After the convention, they run on a single ticket.

South Dakota’s first governor was Arthur C. Mellette, who was also the last governor of the Dakota Territory.

Three of South Dakota's governors have left office before their terms expired. In 1978, Richard F. Kneip resigned from office 6 months before the expiration of his term to accept an appointment as United States ambassador to Singapore. On April 19, 1993, George S. Mickelson was killed in a plane crash near Dubuque, Iowa; Mickelson is the only South Dakota governor to die in office. Mickelson and his father, George Theodore Mickelson, are the only father-son duo to serve as governor. On January 25, 2025, Kristi Noem resigned to become the United States Secretary of Homeland Security in the Cabinet of President Donald Trump.

South Dakota's longest-serving governor was Bill Janklow; he was the first governor to complete two four-year terms, and he did it twice, serving from 1979 to 1987 and again from 1995 to 2003. Janklow is also the only person to serve non-consecutive terms as governor.

Several governors have gone on to serve in other high offices. Coe I. Crawford, Peter Norbeck, William H. McMaster, William J. Bulow, Harlan J. Bushfield, and Mike Rounds followed their tenures as governor by serving in the United States Senate. Bill Janklow served briefly in the United States House of Representatives following his second stint as governor. Kristi Noem was South Dakota's first female governor.

As of 2026, of the 50 states, South Dakota currently holds the longest non-interrupted party control of the governorship. The Republican Party has controlled the South Dakota governorship since January 1, 1979.

== Timeline ==
Timeline of South Dakota governors
