= Governor's Mansion (Shawnee, Oklahoma) =

Historic house in Oklahoma, United States

- Governors Mansion
- U.S. National Register of Historic Places
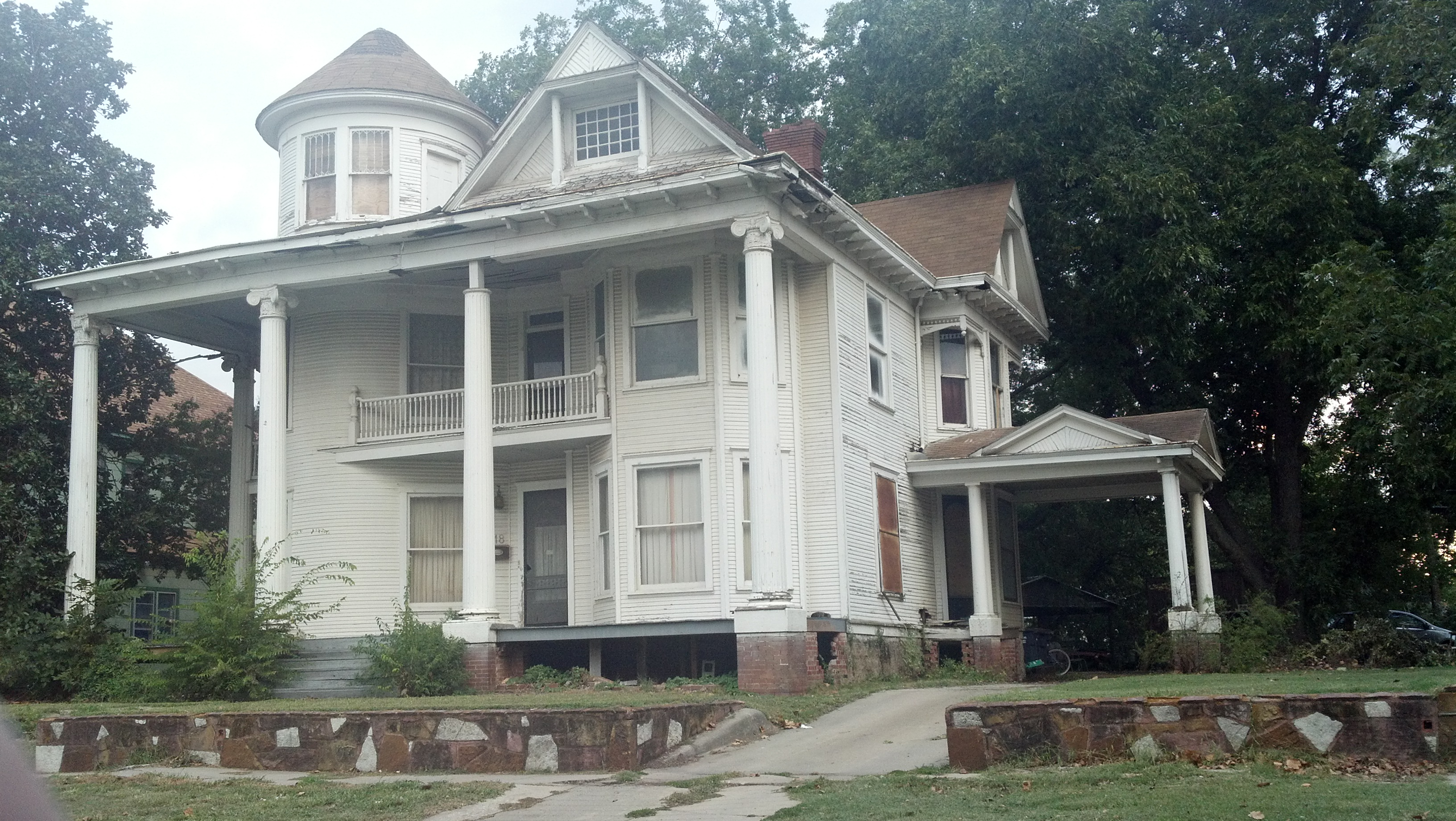
- "Governor's Mansion" in Shawnee; September 26, 2012.

- Location within Oklahoma Location within the United States
- Location: 618 N. Park St., Shawnee, Oklahoma
- Coordinates: 35°20′9″N 96°55′36″W
- Area: less than one acre
- Built: 1903
- Architectural style: Neoclassical
- MPS: Shawnee Historic Homes TR
- NRHP reference No.: 83002122
- Added to NRHP: January 21, 1983

The Governor's Mansion in Shawnee, Oklahoma was built in 1903, on the speculation that Shawnee would be selected as the state capital and that this structure would become the Governor's official residence when Oklahoma became a state. However, Oklahoma did not attain statehood until 1907, and the Legislature chose Guthrie as the first capital, before naming Oklahoma City as the permanent state capital in 1910.

The house was built in an area known as Shawnee's first neighborhood, "...where the first generation of merchants, town leaders and early professionals lived." (Note: The neighborhood is bounded by Highland, Wallace, Kickapoo and Union streets.)

The house was never used as the Governor's Mansion. Once it was clear that Shawnee would not become the state capital, the mansion became just another private residence. It is also known as the Giza House, because it was once owned by Zygmund O. Giza. (Note: The late Zygmund and his wife bought Ruth bought the house in 1971 and lived in it for several years.) It is still considered a local landmark and local residents still refer to it as the Governor's Mansion. It was registered with the National Register of Historic Places in 1983. (Note: Evidently the Gizas had sold the house prior to its nomination in 1983, because the nomination noted that a new owner was then having the house restored to its original condition.)

== Description ==
The footprint of the three-story house is about 60 feet (18 m) by 70 feet (21 m). It sits on a city lot about 1 acre (4,000 m^{2}) in area. Most of the rooms have ceilings that are 12 feet (3.7 m) high. The house has a brick foundation, clapboard siding and a gabled wood shingle roof. The architectural style has been called neoclassical.

The east and south sides of the house are decorated with Ionic columns. The front has a bay window decorated with an open balcony on the first and second stories, which extends into a gable on the third story. The first two stories are rounded on the south end extend into a turret on the third story. A balcony across the second story on the front of the house extends from the bay window to the rounded portion of the house. Except for the windows in the gables, all other windows are double hung. Those in the gables are four by six fixed type style.

The gable on the south side of the third floor is similar to the one on the front of the house. The north side of the house has a bay window on both the first and second stories that extend into a third-story gable. The second-story bay window is decorated with spindles. The north side of the house has an attached porte-cochere that is supported by Doric columns and decorated with two small gables.

== See also ==
- Governor's Mansion (Marshall, Michigan): similar house in the proposed capital of Michigan
