= Governor of Louisiana =

Head of government of the U.S. state of Louisiana

- Gouverneur de la Louisiane (French); Gobernador de Luisiana (Spanish)
- Great Seal of the State of Louisiana

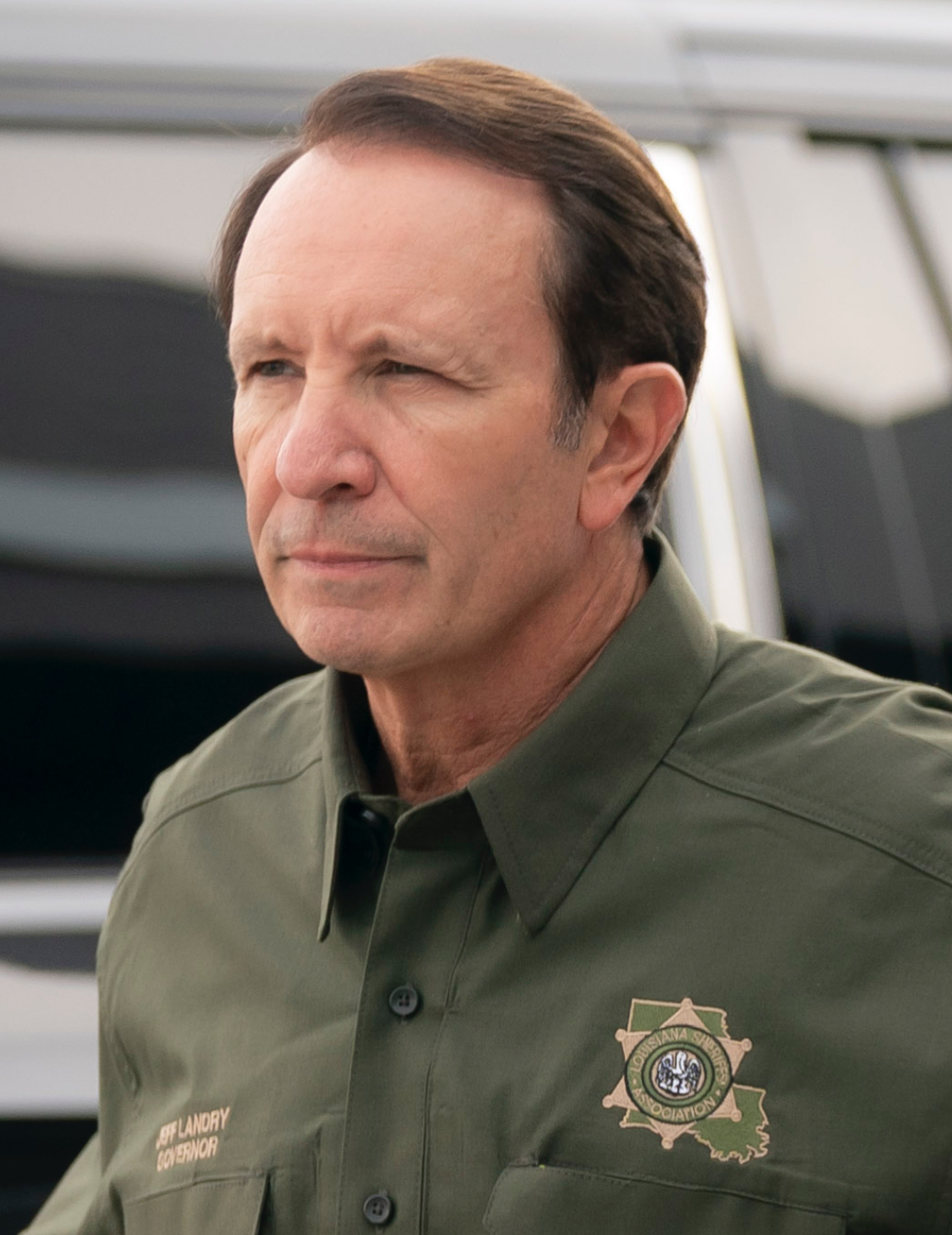
- Incumbent; Jeff Landry since January 8, 2024
- Government of Louisiana
- Style: The Honorable
- Residence: Louisiana Governor's Mansion
- Term length: Four years, renewable once
- Precursor: Governor of Orleans Territory
- Inaugural holder: William C. C. Claiborne
- Formation: April 30, 1812 (214 years ago)
- Succession: Line of succession
- Deputy: Lieutenant Governor of Louisiana
- Salary: US$130,000 per year
- Website: Official Website

The governor of Louisiana (French: Gouverneur de la Louisiane; Spanish: Gobernador de Luisiana) is the chief executive of the U.S. state government of Louisiana. The governor also serves as the commander in chief of the Louisiana National Guard. Republican Jeff Landry has held the office since January 8, 2024.

== History ==
Louisiana ratified its first constitution in 1812. The document provided for a governor who would serve a four-year term and was responsible for appointing all non-elected state officials, making the holder of the office one of the most powerful such executives in the United States at the time. Candidates for the office were limited to white men of at least 35 years of age who held at least $5,000 worth in landed property. Popular gubernatorial elections were held, but the Louisiana State Legislature was given the responsibility of deciding the winner from among the two top-performing candidates. Governors were forbidden from holding consecutive terms. William C. C. Claiborne served as the state's first governor.

The 1845 constitution eliminated minimum property requirements for gubernatorial candidates and ensured the governor would be chosen directly by popular vote. In 1879, governors were authorized to hold successive terms, but this was eliminated in the 1898 constitution. After the 1930s and 1940s, governors increasingly had to manage their image over mass media while their staffs grew in size. In the 1960s, governors assumed responsibility over executing federally-funded programs. In 1966, the state constitution was amended to permit governors to seek consecutive terms in office. The 1974 constitution imposed term limits on the governor and weakened the qualifications for candidates seeking the office. In 2026, the state constitution was amended to prohibit anyone who has served at least six years as governor from running again.

== Election ==
Only qualified voters in Louisiana are eligible to be elected governor. Any candidates for the office must be at least 25 years of age and have resided in the state for the five previous years. Gubernatorial elections in Louisiana occur concurrently with the elections of other statewide officials in the year prior to the United States' next presidential election. The governor serves a four-year term and may serve no more than two terms in their lifetime. Winning candidates traditionally take office in public inaugural ceremonies accompanied by a speech and followed by a ball.

== Powers and duties ==
=== Executive authority and responsibilities ===
The governor is the chief executive of state government in Louisiana, though they share executive authority with other elected officials. They are empowered to request agency heads in state government to report to them on subjects relating to the operation of governmental departments. They are ex officio commander in chief of Louisiana's armed forces—except when the guard is pressed into federal service—and are authorized to call it into service "to preserve law and order, to suppress insurrection, to repel invasion, or in other times of emergency." They are empowered to grant pardons, reprieves, and commutations to convicted criminals.

=== Legislative authority and responsibilities ===
The governor is constitutionally required to report the legislature on "the affairs of state, including its complete financial condition" at the beginnings of their regular sessions. The constitution also obligates the governor to submit an annual operating budget proposal to the legislature as well as a "five-year capital outlay program" during each such session. The governor can exercise veto power over all bills passed by the legislature except proposed constitutional amendments. They have line-item veto power over appropriations bills and are constitutionally obligated to issue line-item vetoes when necessary to ensure that state government operates on a balanced budget. A veto can be overridden by a two-thirds majority vote of the legislature. The governor is also empowered to call the legislature into special session at their discretion to consider matters of their choosing.

== Vacancies and succession ==
Article 4, Section 14 of the state constitution enumerates the line of succession in the event there is a permanent vacancy in the governor's office. The position of governor passes sequentially as follows: first to the lieutenant governor, then the secretary of state, then the attorney general, then the state treasurer, then the presiding officer of the Senate, and finally the Speaker of the House. They serve the remainder of the original governor's term. In the event of the governor's momentary absence from Louisiana, the constitution tasks the lieutenant governor with serving as acting governor. (Note: Evolution in telecommunications technology since this constitutional provision was ratified have enabled the governor to maintain more effective contact with their subordinates despite being out of the state. Court rulings in the state have historically noted differences in the scope of governor's absences with regards to their ability to return and assert their leadership on short on notice.) While there is no firm legal direction regarding temporary succession in the event both the governor and lieutenant governor are out of state at the same time, in practice the position of acting governor is passed down the line of succession enumerated for permanent vacancies.

== Office structure ==
The office of the governor is made up of several departments: Chief of Staff's Office, Deputy Chiefs of Staff, Special Assistants to the Governor, Communications and Press, Constituent Services, Legal, Legislative Affairs, Policy, Programs and Planning, the Office of Coastal Activities, Boards and Commissions, Finance and Administration, and the Office of Elderly Affairs. There are 12 executive agencies under the governor's purview. The appointed secretaries which lead the agencies constitute the governor's cabinet. The governor's compensation is determined by law. They collect an annual salary of $130,000.

== Political dynamics ==
Governors usually informally serve as the state leader of whatever political party to which they belong. In this political capacity they often raise funds for their party, recruit candidates for elections, and advocate for major policy proposals. Vetoes issued by governors of the state are typically not overturned.

== Timeline ==
Timeline of Louisiana governors

== Works cited ==
- Dawson, Joseph G. III (1990). The Louisiana Governors: From Iberville to Edwards. Louisiana State University Press. ISBN 9780807115275.
- Hargrave, W. Lee (2011). The Louisiana State Constitution. Oxford University Press. ISBN 9780199779031.
- Qualifications of Candidates (PDF), Government of Louisiana, October 2022
- State And Local Government In Louisiana: An Overview (PDF) (11th ed.). Baton Rouge: Louisiana House of Representatives Legislative Services. 2011. OCLC 775011735.
