= Governor of New Mexico =

Head of government of the U.S. state of New Mexico

- Spanish: Gobernadora de Nuevo México
- Seal of the governor

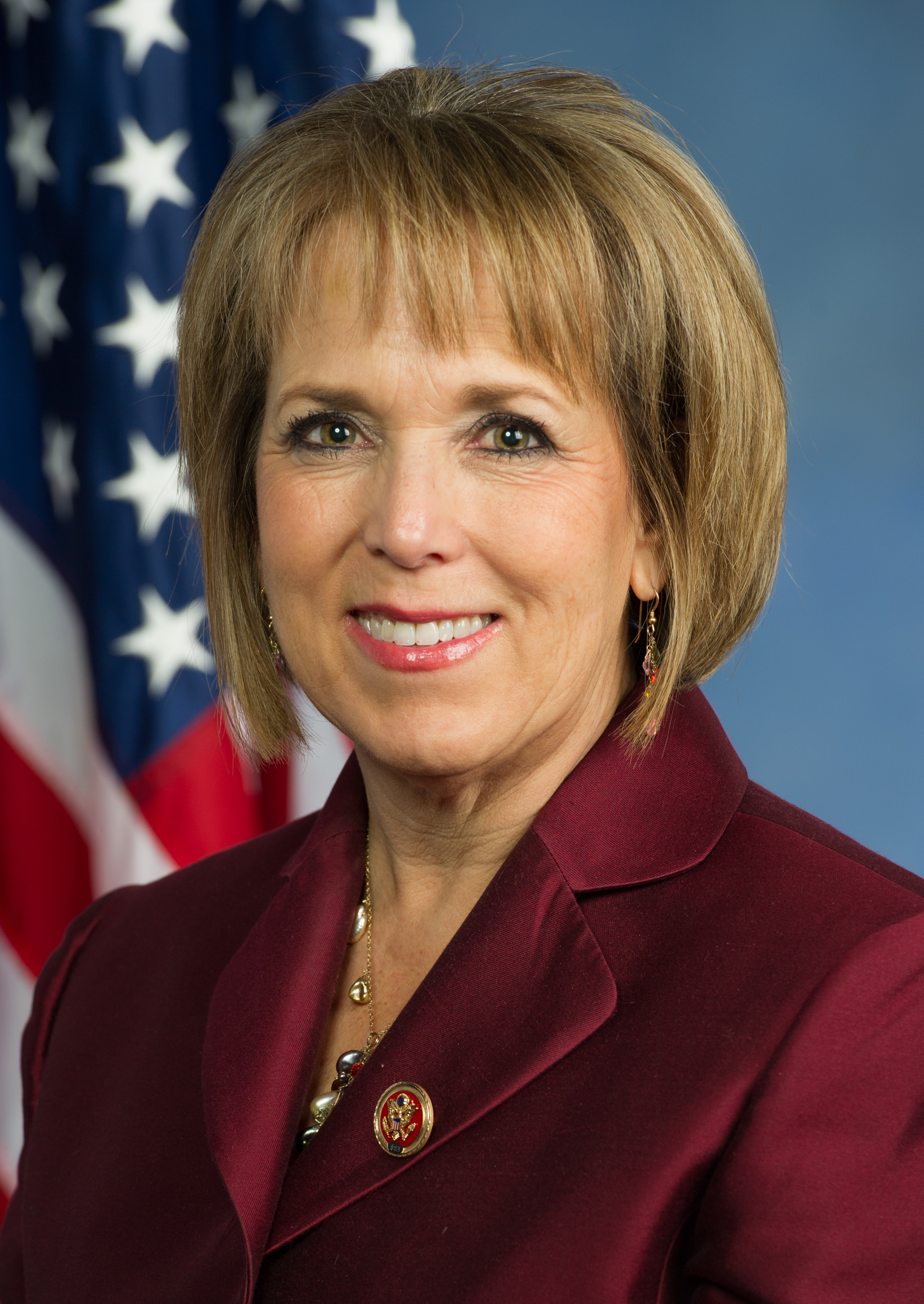
- Incumbent; Michelle Lujan Grisham since January 1, 2019
- Style: Governor (informal); The Honorable (formal)
- Status: Head of state; Head of government
- Residence: New Mexico Governor's Mansion
- Term length: Four years, renewable once consecutively
- Constituting instrument: New Mexico Constitution
- Precursor: Governor of Nuevo México; Spanish governors; Mexican governors; Governor of New Mexico Territory
- Inaugural holder: William C. McDonald
- Formation: January 14, 1912 (114 years ago)
- Succession: Line of succession
- Deputy: Lieutenant Governor of New Mexico
- Salary: $110,000 (2022)
- Website: Official website

The governor of New Mexico (Spanish: gobernador de Nuevo México) is the head of government of New Mexico. The governor is the head of the executive branch of New Mexico's state government and the commander-in-chief of the New Mexico National Guard. As noted in the governor's seal, this gubernatorial office is a scion of the Spanish and Mexican governors of Nuevo México (1598) and the governors of the New Mexico Territory (1851). The officeholder is afforded the courtesy title of The Honorable for life. The current governor is Michelle Lujan Grisham, a Democrat, who was sworn in as the 32nd governor of New Mexico on January 1, 2019.

== History ==
During the occupation of New Mexico by the United States Military starting in 1846, a military governor was appointed to oversee the area; military governors, at times, were assisted by civilian governors. In 1850, New Mexico was organized as a Territory, and the governor was appointed by the President of the United States. The office of governor was created in 1912 when New Mexico was officially admitted to the United States as the 47th state.

== Election to the governorship ==
=== Requirements to hold office ===
Section Three of Article V of the New Mexico Constitution establishes the requirements a person must meet in order to become governor. The governor must be a citizen of the United States, be at least 30 years old, and have been a resident of New Mexico for at least five years prior to election.

=== Term(s) of office ===
Under Section One of Article V of the New Mexico Constitution, a governor may be elected any number of times, but not more than twice in a row. Governors serving two consecutive terms are eligible to run again after sitting out one full term.

== Relationship with lieutenant governor ==
The lieutenant governor of New Mexico is elected jointly as the running mate of the gubernatorial candidate in general elections.

== Powers ==
While the governor heads the Executive Branch of the New Mexico state government, the governor does not have absolute power. Other state executives, such as the lieutenant governor, the secretary of state, and the attorney general are also elected to office.

=== Duties ===
Responsibilities include making annual State of the State addresses to the New Mexico State Legislature, submitting the budget, and ensuring that state laws are enforced.

== Residence ==
Since 1954, the Governor of New Mexico has resided in the New Mexico Governor's Mansion. Prior to its construction, the governor's residence was located adjacent to the New Mexico State Capitol in downtown Santa Fe. Before 1909, the governor resided in the Palace of the Governors, which is listed as a National Historic Landmark. The Palace of the Governors is the oldest continuously occupied public building in the United States.

== Line of succession ==
According to Section Seven of Article V of the New Mexico Constitution, in the event of the death, resignation, removal, impeachment, absence from the state, failure to qualify, or incapacity due to illness of the governor, the lieutenant governor is the first person in the order of succession and thus serves as governor.

If there is no lieutenant governor, or that person is unable to perform the duties of governor, the Secretary of State serves as governor. If there is no Secretary of State, the President pro Tempore of the Senate serves as governor. If there is no President pro Tempore of the Senate, or if that person is unable to perform the duties of governor, then the Speaker of the House serves as governor.

#	Office	Current officer
	May succeed to governorship	
	Governor of New Mexico	Michelle Lujan Grisham
1	Lieutenant Governor of New Mexico	Howie Morales
2	Secretary of State of New Mexico	Maggie Toulouse Oliver
3	President Pro Tempore of the Senate	Mimi Stewart
4	Speaker of the House of Representatives	Javier Martínez
	May serve as Emergency Interim Successor	
5	Attorney General of New Mexico	Raul Torrez
6	State Auditor	Joseph Maestas
7	State Treasurer	Laura Montoya
8	Commissioner of Public Lands	Stephanie Garcia Richard

== Timeline ==
Timeline of New Mexico governors
