= Beauregard Town =

- Beauregard Town Historic District
- U.S. National Register of Historic Places
- U.S. Historic district
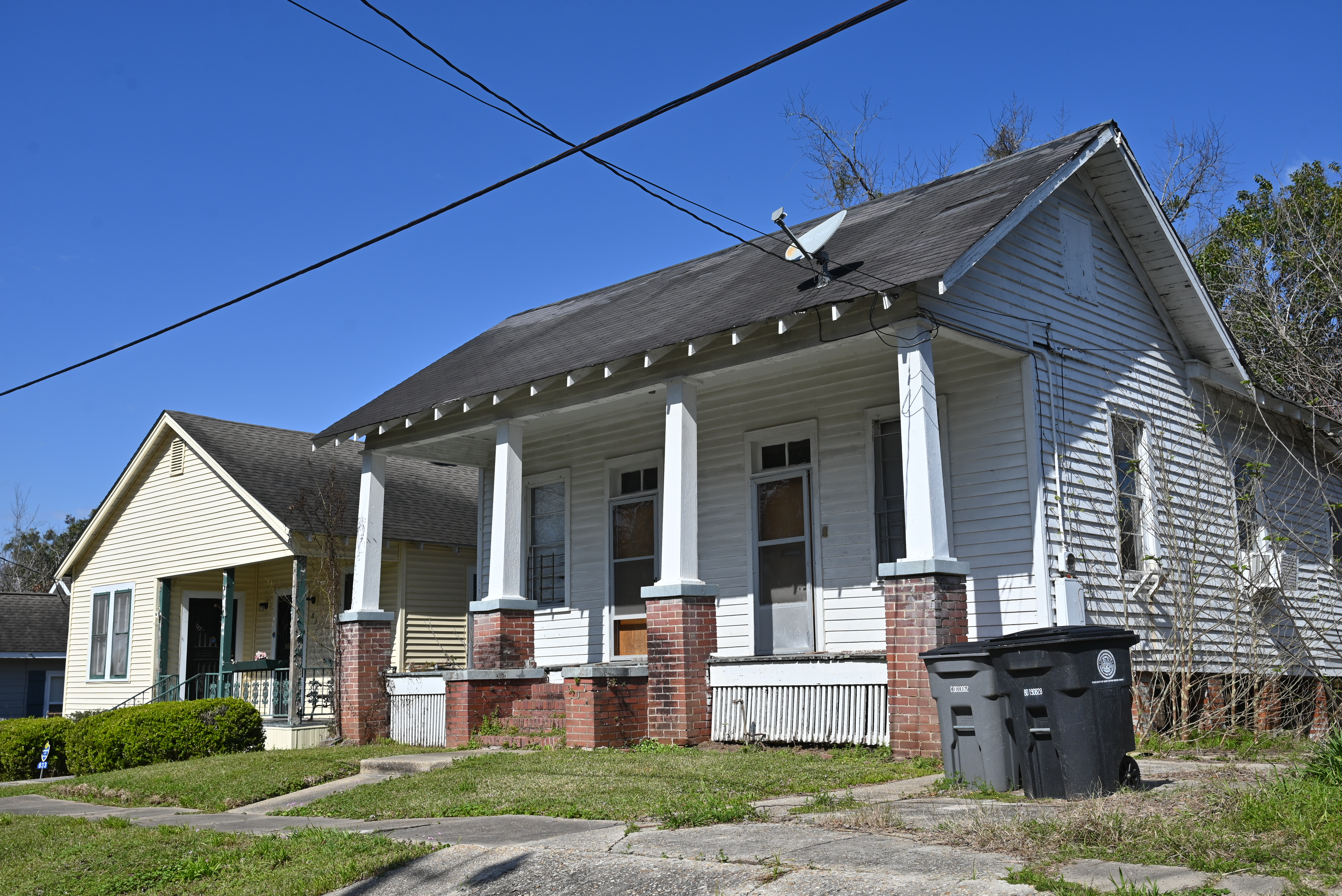

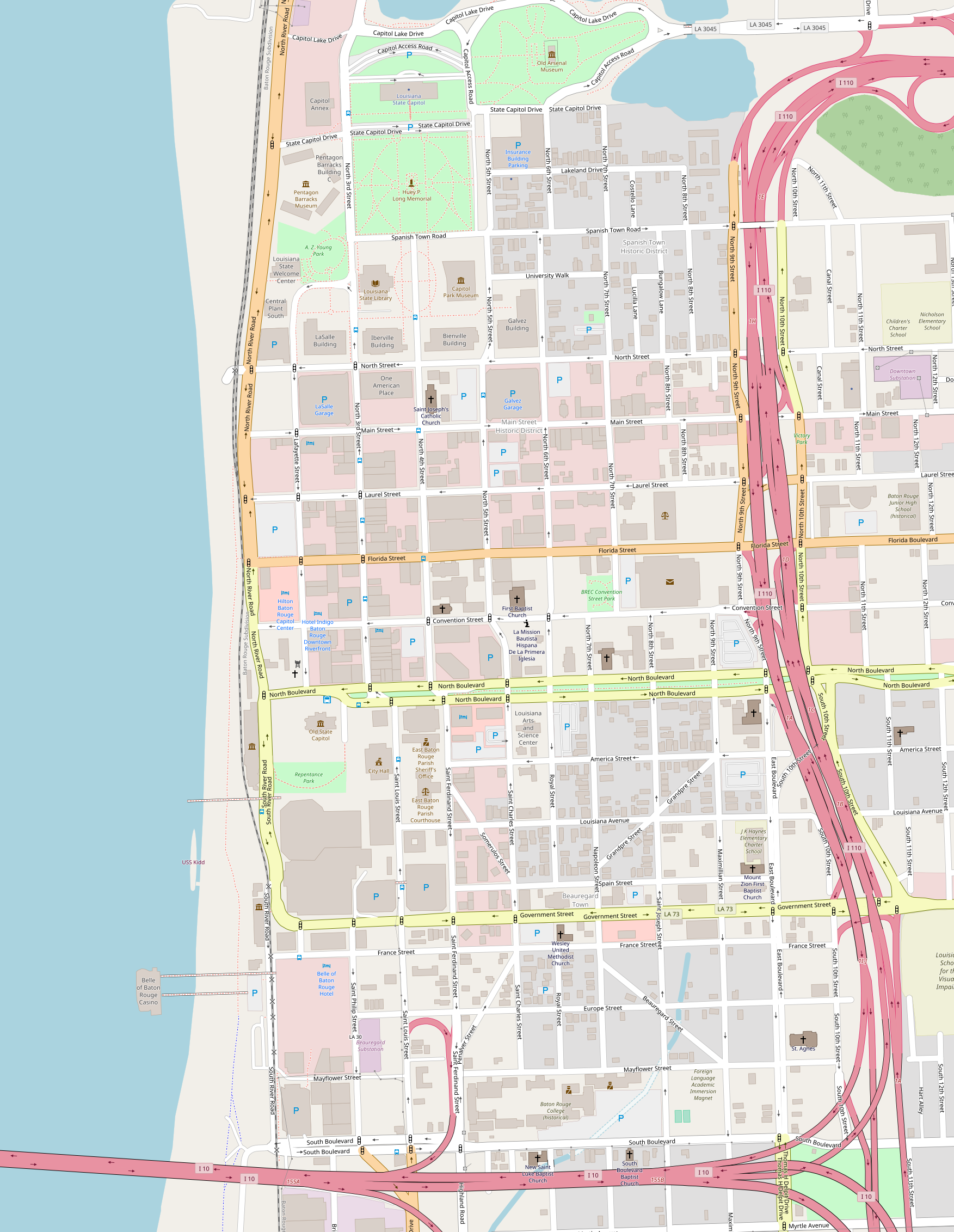
- Location within Baton Rouge Downtown

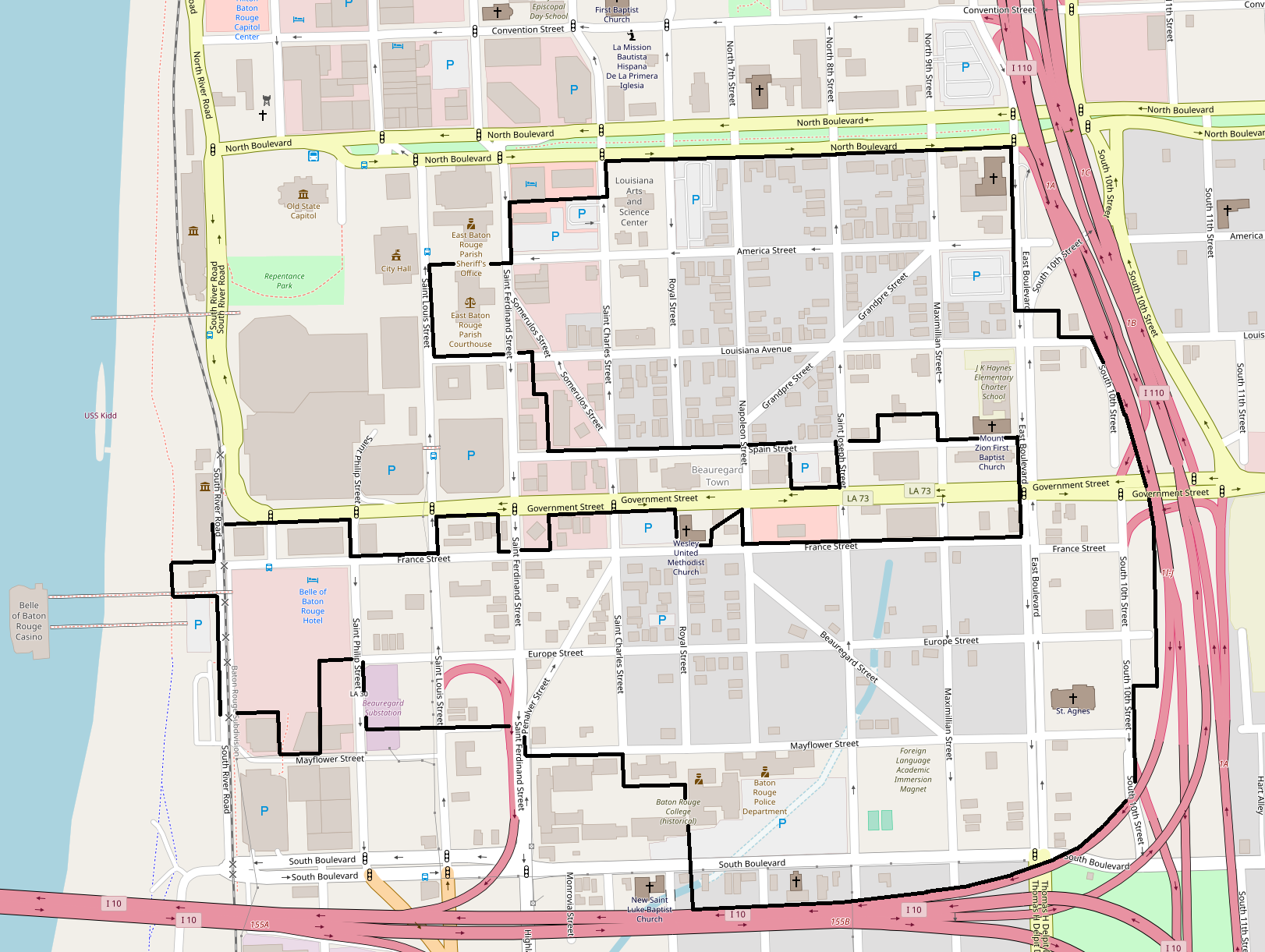
- Location: Roughly bounded by North Boulevard, East Boulevard, Government Street, South 10th Street, South Boulevard, South River Road and Saint Louis Street, Baton Rouge, Louisiana
- Coordinates: 30°26′36″N 91°11′04″W
- Area: about 122 acres (49 ha)
- Built: 1806
- Architect: Elias Beauregard, et al.
- Architectural style: Colonial Revival, Classical Revival, Late Victorian, Bungalow/Craftsman and Queen Anne
- NRHP reference No.: 80001713 (original); 83000500 (increase 1); 83003611 (increase 2); 99001712 (increase 3)

Significant dates
- Added to NRHP: October 14, 1980
- Boundary increases: April 14, 1983; October 11, 1983; February 04, 2000

Beauregard Town, also known as Beauregard Town Historic District, is a historic district in downtown Baton Rouge, Louisiana, anchored by Government Street. Elias Beauregard commissioned Arsène Lacarrière-Latour to draw up the plans to develop his plantation property into a town in the "Grand European Manner". Advertisements for the scheme were circulated in 1806, though many lots remained empty until the late nineteenth century when Baton Rouge was designated as the state capitol. The district was listed on the National Register of Historic Places in 1980. It is the second-oldest neighborhood in Baton Rouge (after Spanish Town).

Beauregard Town is the area bounded by North Boulevard, South Boulevard, East Boulevard, and on the west by Saint Louis Street. Government Street (or the "Grand Rue" as Beauregard wanted it) runs through the middle of Beauregard Town, with four streets — Beauregard, Grandpre, Penalvert, and Somerulos — approaching it on diagonal angles in the form of an "X", typical of the European manner of town design at the time. Its boundaries were increased twice in 1983, and once more in 2000.

Those streets are named for Beauregard himself, for Don Carlos Louis Boucher de Grand Pré (the Spanish administrator in 1806), for Roman Catholic Bishop Luis de Penalver (the bishop in 1806), and for the Marquis de Someruelos, Captain General of Cuba. Beauregard named other streets after rulers: Philip, Louis, Ferdinand, Charles, Napoleon, and Maximilian (several of these namesakes became saints through later translation error). Other streets Beauregard named after countries and continents: Spain, France, America, and Europe.

Historic homes in Beauregard Town include the Governor Henry L. Fuqua House (circa 1834) and the Williams House (circa 1890), both on Napoleon Street, as well as the Judge Robert D. Beale House (circa 1840) on the corner of St. Louis and Government streets. It includes the Old Louisiana Governor's Mansion, separately listed on the National Register.

The first 1983 increase added the privately owned Levy Hay Warehouse, built in 1920, on Front Street. The second 1983 increase added the state-owned Armour Building, built in 1929, on Mayflower Street. The 2000 increase added state-owned houses of Bungalow/Craftsman and Queen Anne architecture.

== See also ==
- Old Louisiana Governor's Mansion, included in the Beauregard Town Historic District
- National Register of Historic Places listings in East Baton Rouge Parish, Louisiana
