= Governor Leslie Jensen House =

Historic house in South Dakota, United States

- U.S. National Register of Historic Places
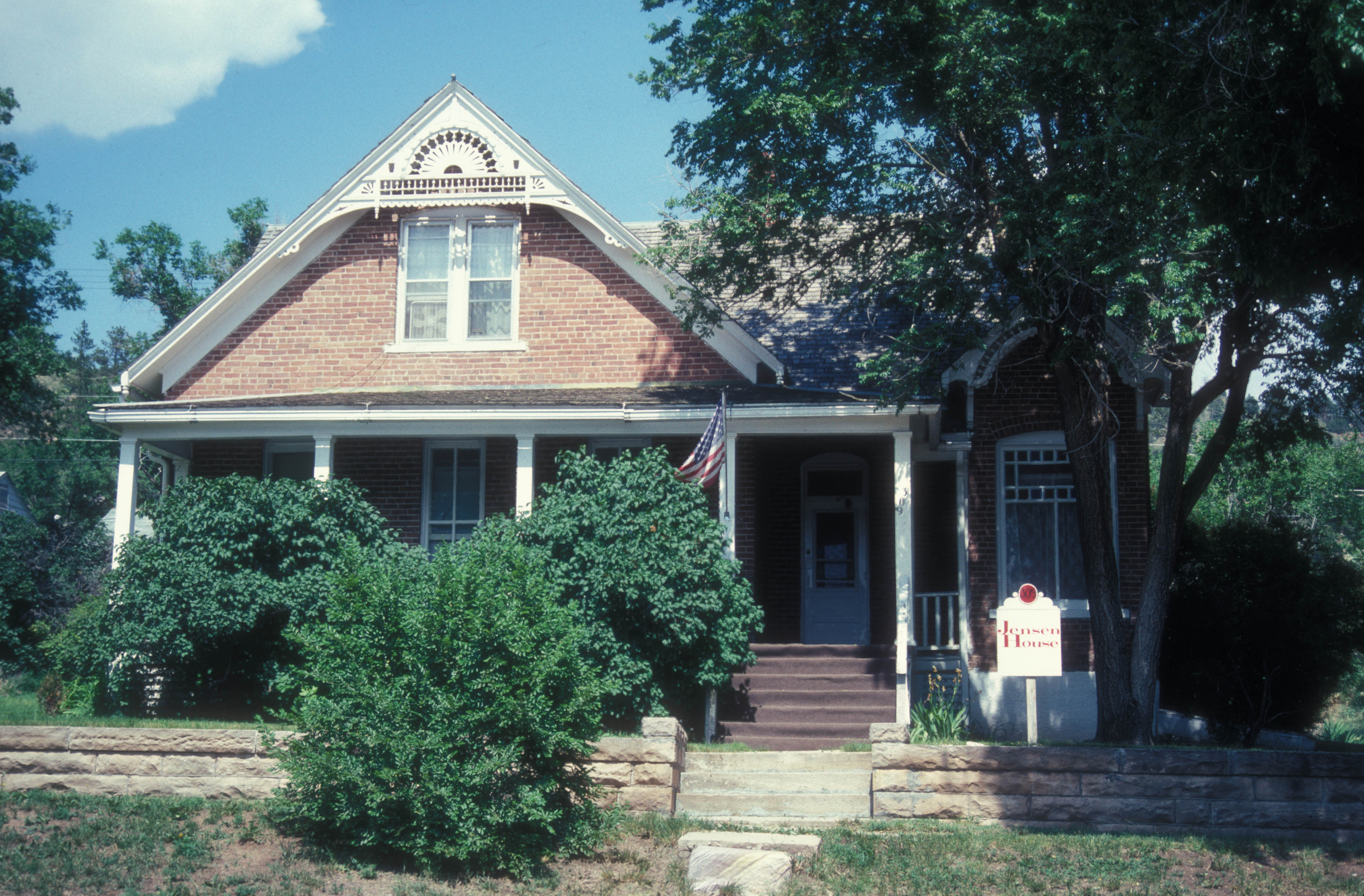

- Location within South Dakota Location within the United States
- Location: 309 S. Fifth St., Hot Springs, South Dakota
- Coordinates: 43°25′46″N 103°28′12″W
- Area: less than one acre
- Built: 1899
- Architectural style: Queen Anne, Vernacular Queen Anne
- NRHP reference No.: 87001731
- Added to NRHP: September 25, 1987

The Governor Leslie Jensen House, at 309 S. Fifth St. in Hot Springs, South Dakota, was built in 1899 for Christian Jensen, and it was the longtime home of Christian's son and South Dakota's 15th governor Leslie Jensen (1892–1964).

It is a "simplified vernacular Queen Anne cottage built of brick, with some decorative Stick Style and Eastlake details. Also known as The Jensen House or the Christian Jensen House, it was listed on the National Register of Historic Places in 1987. The listing included its carriage house as a contributing building.

== See also ==
- Governor William J. Bulow House, Beresford, South Dakota, also NRHP-listed
- Governor John L. Pennington House, Yankton, South Dakota, also NRHP-listed
