= South Dakota Governor's Residence =

Official residence of the governor of South Dakota

Coordinates: 44.364817°N 100.341348°W

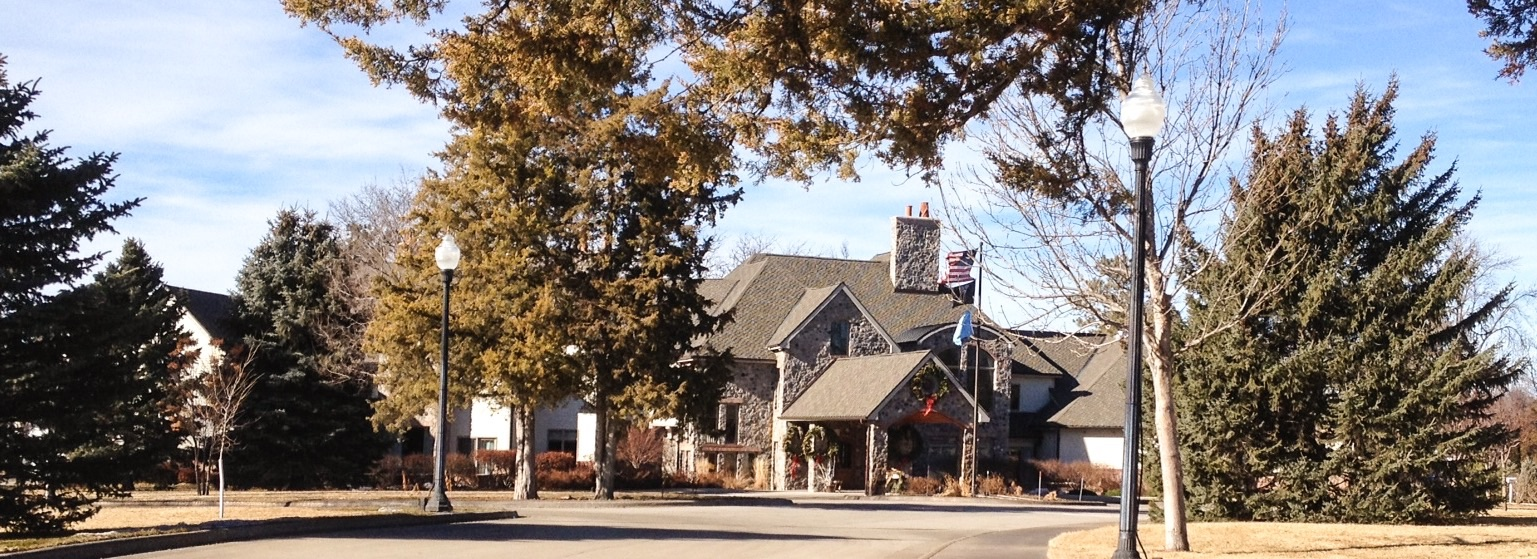
Governor's Mansion in January 2015

The South Dakota Governor's Residence is the official residence of the governor of South Dakota. The first resident, Governor Mike Rounds, lived in the house after its dedication on August 3, 2005. Its current resident is Governor Larry Rhoden.

== Old Governor's Residence ==
The South Dakota governor's mansion, built across the small man-made pond from the South Dakota State Capitol Building by the Works Progress Administration in the 1930s. It was subsequently moved near Rapid City, South Dakota, when the construction of the new mansion began in the spring of 2004. The last governor to live there was Mike Rounds.

== New Governor's Residence ==
Construction began in the spring of 2004. Private and business donations funded the new mansion. The total cost of the project was $2.87 million. The 14,000-square-foot (1,300 m^{2}) residence is on the east shore of Capitol Lake, at 119 North Washington Avenue, in Pierre, South Dakota. Mike Rounds was the inaugural resident. The current resident of the mansion is Larry Rhoden.
