= Governor William J. Bulow House =

Historic house in South Dakota, United States

- U.S. National Register of Historic Places
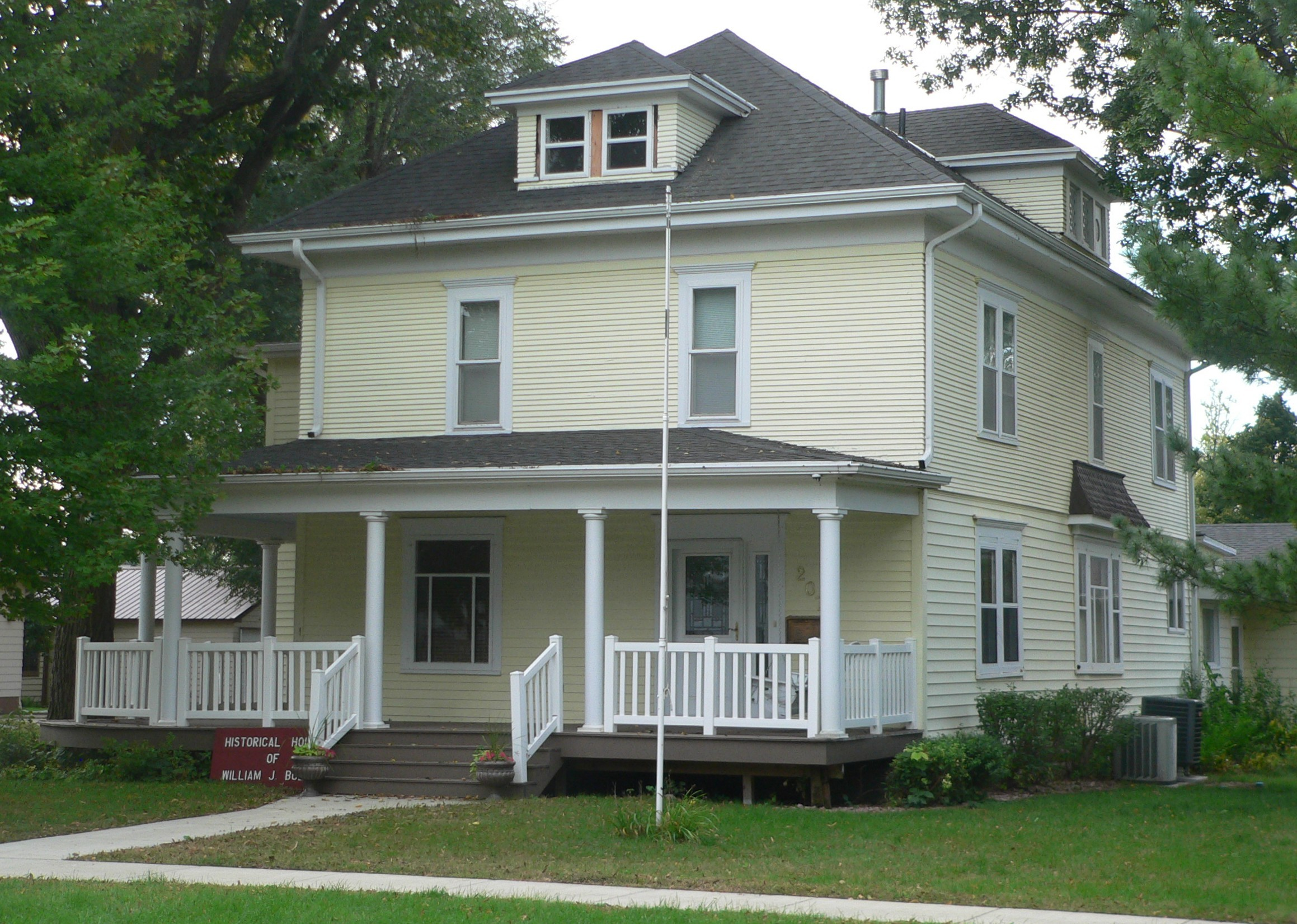

- Location within South Dakota Location within the United States
- Location: 207 W. Hemlock St., Beresford, South Dakota
- Coordinates: 43.081343°N 96.776478°W
- Built: 1893
- NRHP reference No.: 86001024
- Added to NRHP: May 8, 1986

The Governor William J. Bulow House, located at 207 W. Hemlock St. in Beresford, South Dakota, was built in 1893. It was listed on the National Register of Historic Places in 1986.

== See also ==
- Governor Leslie Jensen House, Hot Spring, South Dakota, also NRHP-listed
- Governor John L. Pennington House, Yankton, South Dakota, also NRHP-listed
