= Governor's Mansion (Marshall, Michigan) =

Historic house in Michigan, United States

- U.S. National Register of Historic Places
- Michigan State Historic Site
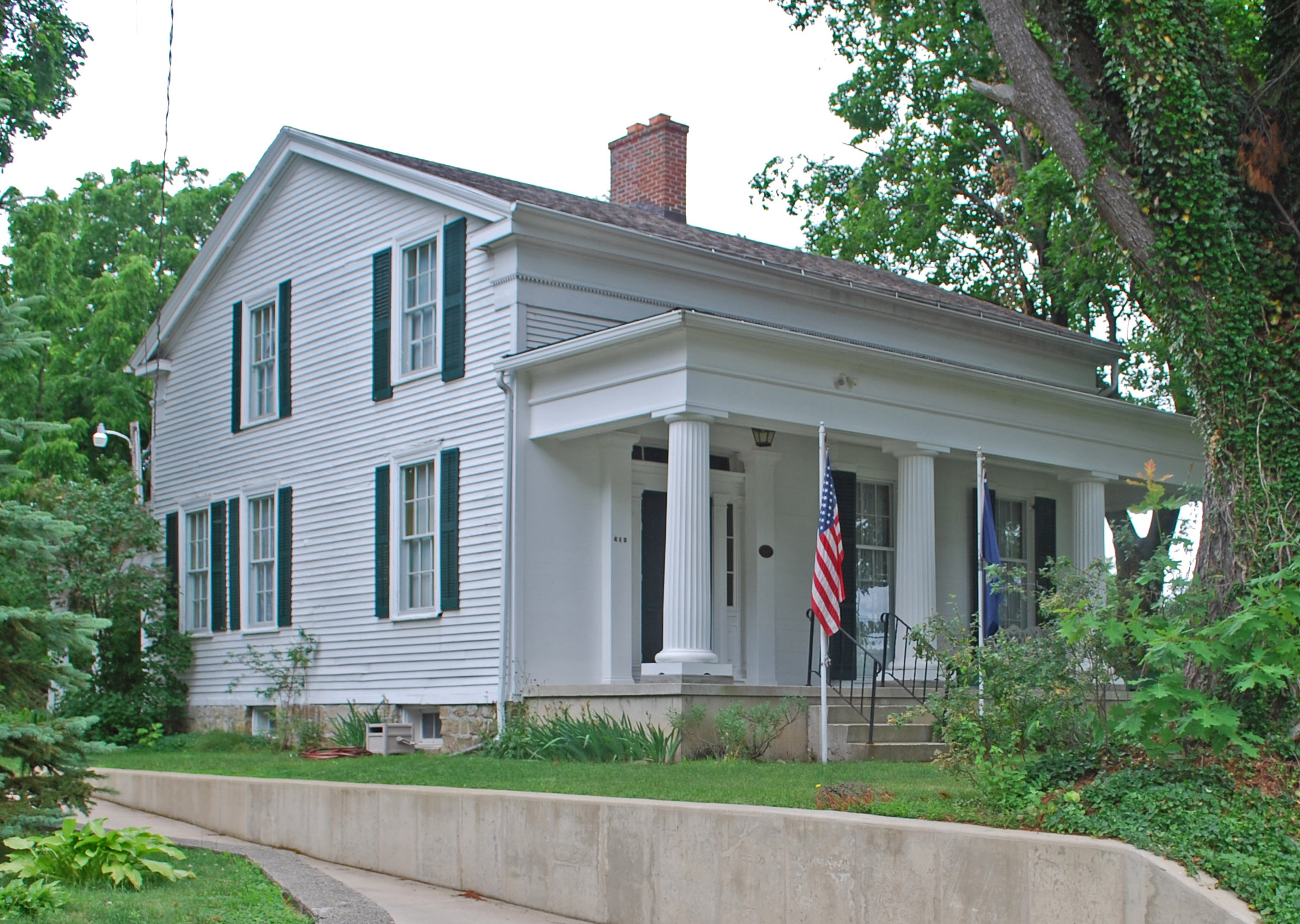

- Location within Michigan Location within the United States
- Interactive map of Governor's Mansion
- Location: 621 S. Marshall Ave., Marshall, Michigan
- Coordinates: 42°15′54″N 84°57′16″W
- Area: 1 acre (0.40 ha)
- Built: 1839
- Architectural style: Greek Revival
- NRHP reference No.: 75000939
- Added to NRHP: January 8, 1975

The Governor's Mansion at 621 S. Marshall Ave. in Marshall, Michigan is a historic house built in 1839 with elements of Greek Revival architecture. It is also known as Governor's Mansion Museum. It was listed on the National Register of Historic Places in 1975. In 2017, the house is a museum owned and operated by the Mary Marshall Chapter of Daughters of the American Revolution.

== History ==
In 1839, Marshall citizen James Wright Gordon, recently elected to the state senate, began agitating for Marshall to be designated as the state capital. In expectation, Gordon purchased land across from where the Capitol was proposed to be built and constructed this house. It has been referred to as the "Governor's Mansion" since its construction. Gordon became lieutenant governor, and then acting governor of Michigan in 1841. However, Lansing was chosen as the new state capital in 1847, dashing Marshall's hopes.

Gordon was later appointed to the consular service in South America by Zachary Taylor, and died there in 1853. Gordon's widow owned of the house until 1882, when it was purchased by Mrs. Flory Palmer, a local resident. She and her daughter, Bertha Palmer Brady, lived in the house for many years. In 1967, the Brady heirs donated the property to the local Mary Marshall Chapter of the Daughters of the American Revolution. The chapter converted the house into their meeting hall and as a museum.

== Description ==
The "Governor's Mansion" in Marshall is a two-story white frame Greek Revival building built in a side-hall plan. It has a single-story rear addition. The main section of the house has clapboard siding on the sides and horizontal plank siding on the front. In the front is a wide Doric portico with a Greek entablature above. Under the portico are two vertically elongated sash windows, and a front entrance framed by pilasters decorated with carved acanthus leaves. A dentiled cornice runs across the main portion of the house.

== See also ==
- Michigan Governor's Mansion
- Michigan Governor's Summer Residence
- Governor's Mansion (Shawnee, Oklahoma): similar house in the proposed capital of Oklahoma
