= Old Louisiana Governor's Mansion =

Historic house in Louisiana, United States

- U.S. National Register of Historic Places
- U.S. Historic district – Contributing property
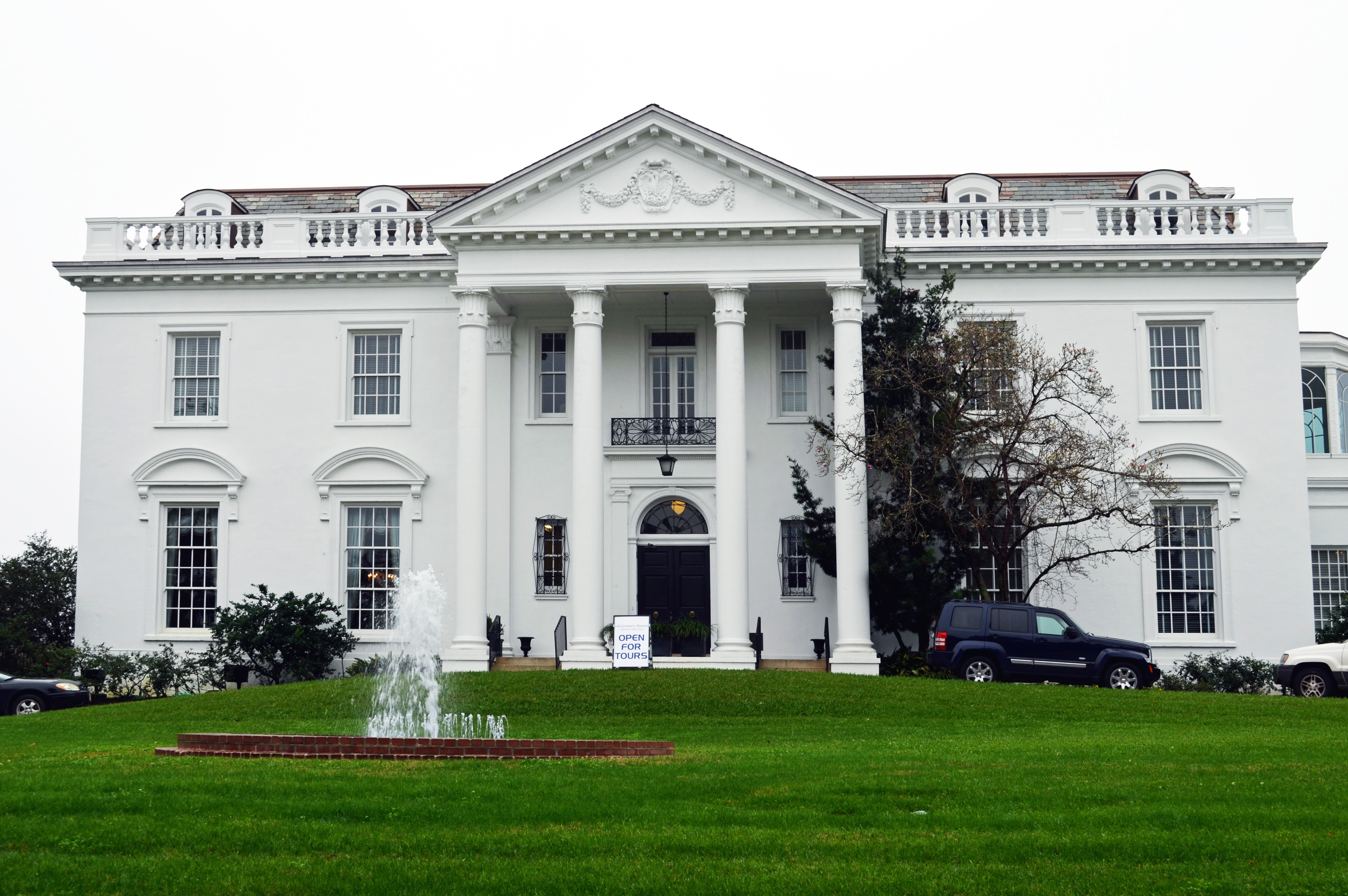
- View of the Old Governor's Mansion, 2013

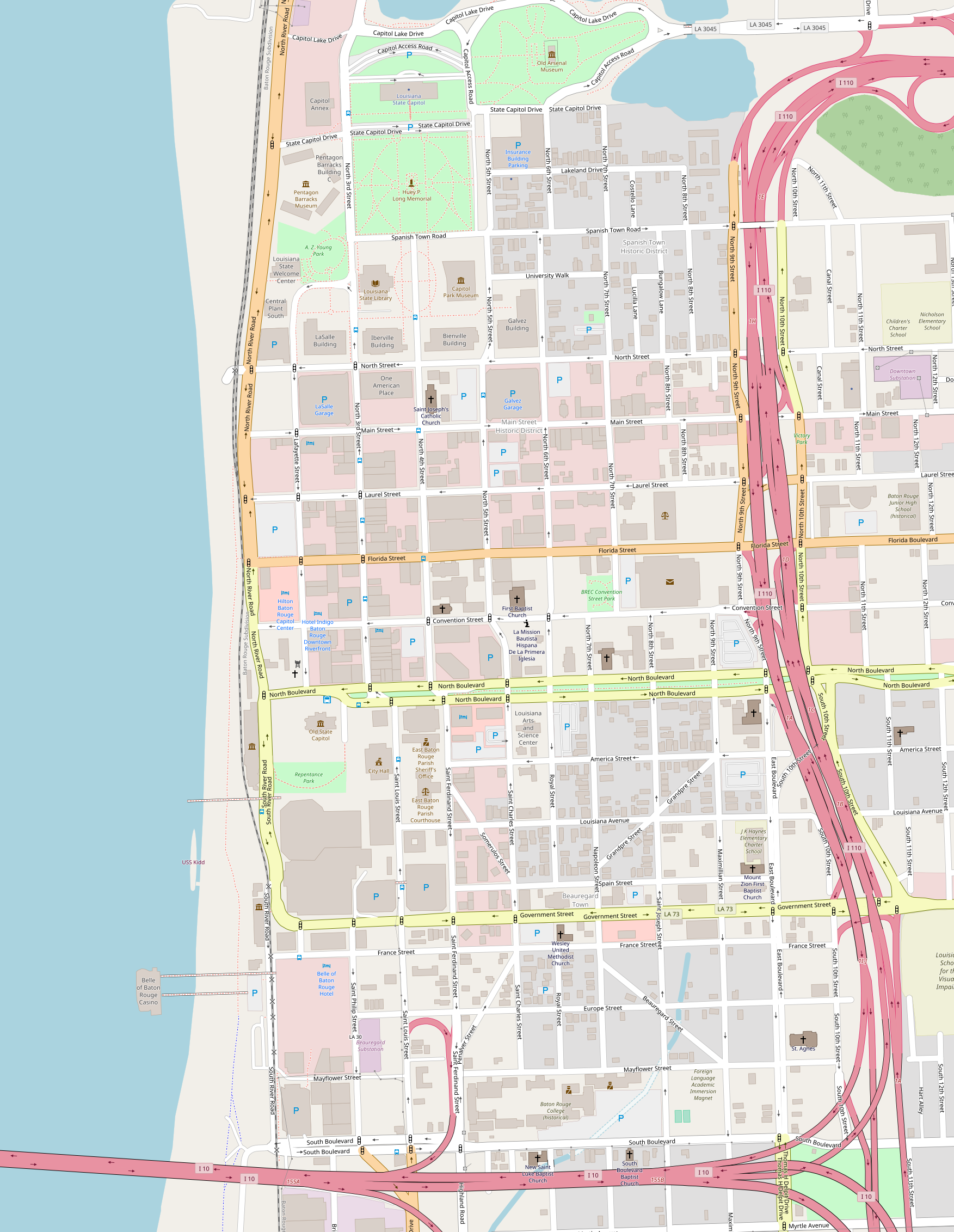
- Location within Baton Rouge Downtown
- Location: 502 North Boulevard, Baton Rouge, Louisiana
- Coordinates: 30°26′48″N 91°11′06″W
- Area: less than one acre
- Built: 1930 (95 years ago)
- Architect: Dreyfus, Weiss & Seifert
- Architectural style: Classical Revival
- Part of: Beauregard Town Historic District (ID80001713)
- NRHP reference No.: 75000847

Significant dates
- Added to NRHP: July 24, 1975 (50 years agi)
- Designated CP: October 14, 1980

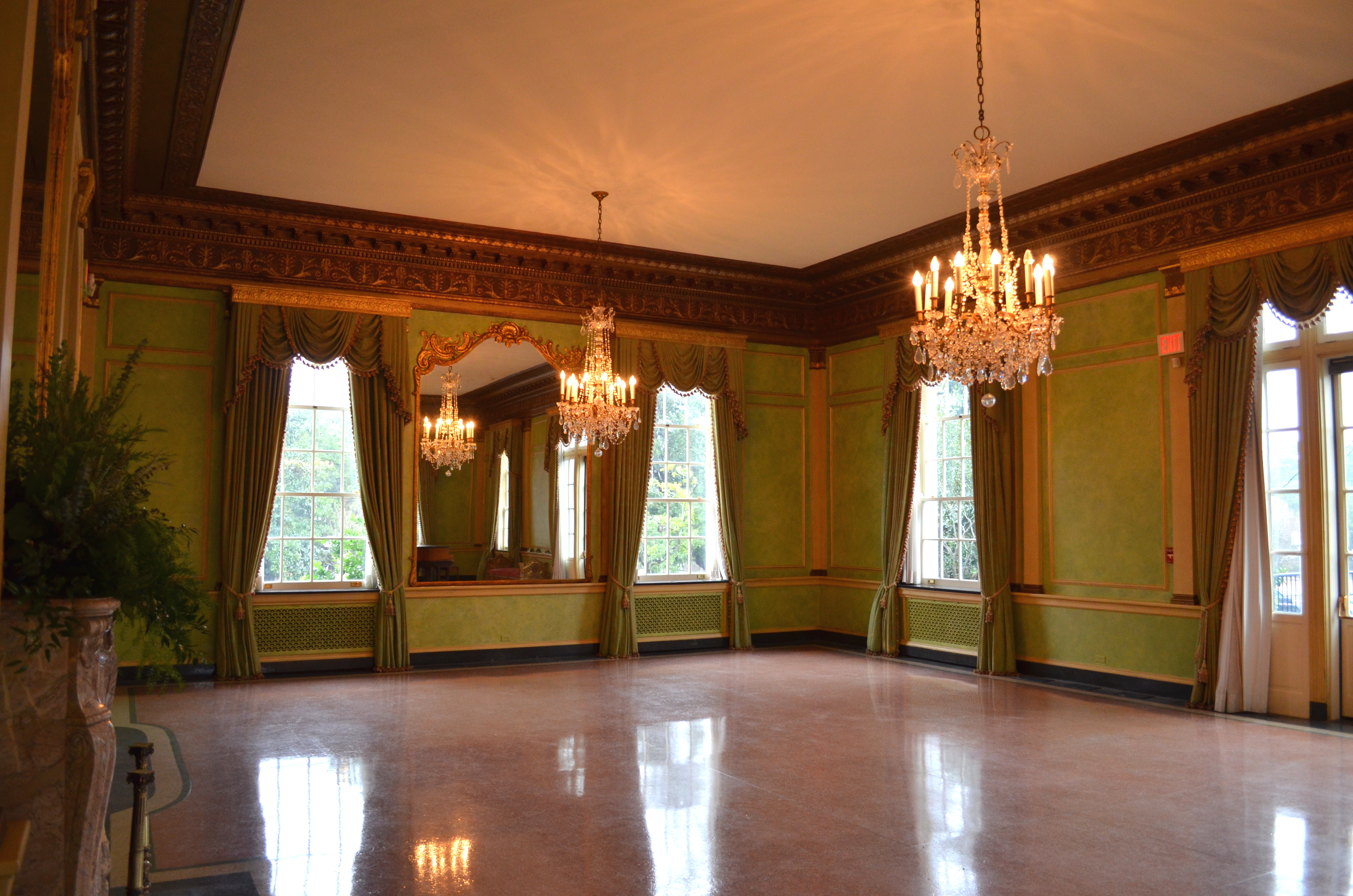
East room

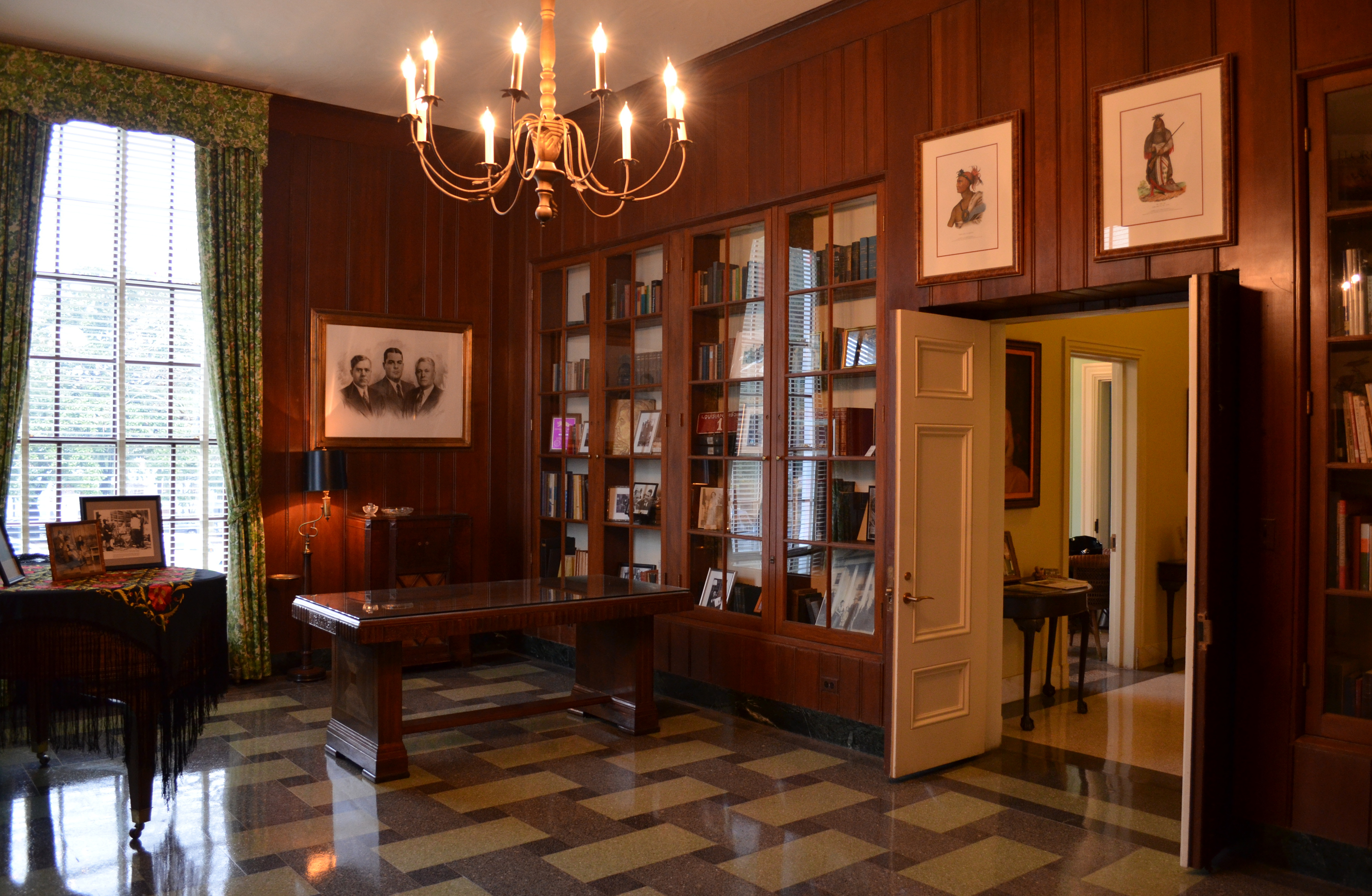
Library

The Old Louisiana Governor's Mansion is located at 502 North Blvd. between Royal and St. Charles Streets in Baton Rouge and was used as Louisiana's official gubernatorial residence between 1930 and 1963; a new residence was completed in 1963. The Old Governor's Mansion was built under the governorship of Huey Long, its first resident. The building is reported to be inspired by the White House in Washington D.C. as it was originally designed by Thomas Jefferson. It is said that Long wanted to be familiar with the White House when he became president, so he had the White House duplicated in Baton Rouge. Some dispute this legend and simply say that the building is merely a fine example of a Georgian-style mansion.

== History ==
The Old Governor's Mansion is the second governor's mansion to occupy the site. Although Louisiana became a state in 1812, the first purchase of a gubernatorial mansion was not until 1887, when the State of Louisiana purchased the house from the heirs of Nathan Knox for $10,000. The Knox mansion, located at the present site of the Old Governor's Mansion, was built in 1857. Although purchased during the term of Governor Samuel D. McEnery, the first governor to occupy the Knox mansion was Francis T. Nicholls. The Knox mansion served as the official residence of Louisiana governors from 1887 until 1929, when it was razed under the direction of Huey P. Long, and the present Old Governor's Mansion was built.

When Huey P. Long took office in 1928, the existing governor's mansion was to him a symbol of the past and more importantly the political opposition. In February 1929, Long succeeded in tearing down the Knox mansion, enlisting the aid of local convicted criminals to disassemble it. On the very next day, the plans and specifications were approved for the new mansion. This event is one of the incidents that contributed to and figured in the (unsuccessful) impeachment proceedings against Long in 1930. Building the Old Governor's Mansion cost almost $150,000, plus an additional $22,000 for the finest damask and velvet drapes, crystal chandeliers, and other fine appointments.

The Old Governor's Mansion served as a residence to nine governors until 1963, when the Louisiana Governor's Mansion was constructed just east of the Louisiana State Capitol building. In 1964, the Old Governor's Mansion became the home of the Louisiana Art & Science Museum (then, Louisiana Art & Science Center). The Mansion served as headquarters for the Louisiana Arts & Science Museum until 1976, when the museum moved to new quarters in the Old Illinois Central Train Station. In 1978, the Mansion was listed on the National Register of Historic Places. The Mansion underwent restoration from 1996 to 1998, and opened as a historic house museum in 1999. It is currently under the management of Louisiana's Secretary of State.

Louisiana's Old Governor's Mansion offers tours of the Mansion to visitors and school groups, and also offers the Mansion as an event venue for weddings, bridal portraits, corporate parties, and more.

The mansion was added to the National Register of Historic Places on July 24, 1975. It was also added as a contributing resource to the Beauregard Town Historic District at the time of its creation on October 14, 1980.

== See also ==
- Beauregard Town
- Old Louisiana State Capitol
- National Register of Historic Places listings in East Baton Rouge Parish, Louisiana
