= Michigan Governor's Summer Residence =

Historic house in Michigan, United States

- Lawrence Andrew Young Cottage
- U.S. National Register of Historic Places
- Michigan State Historic Site
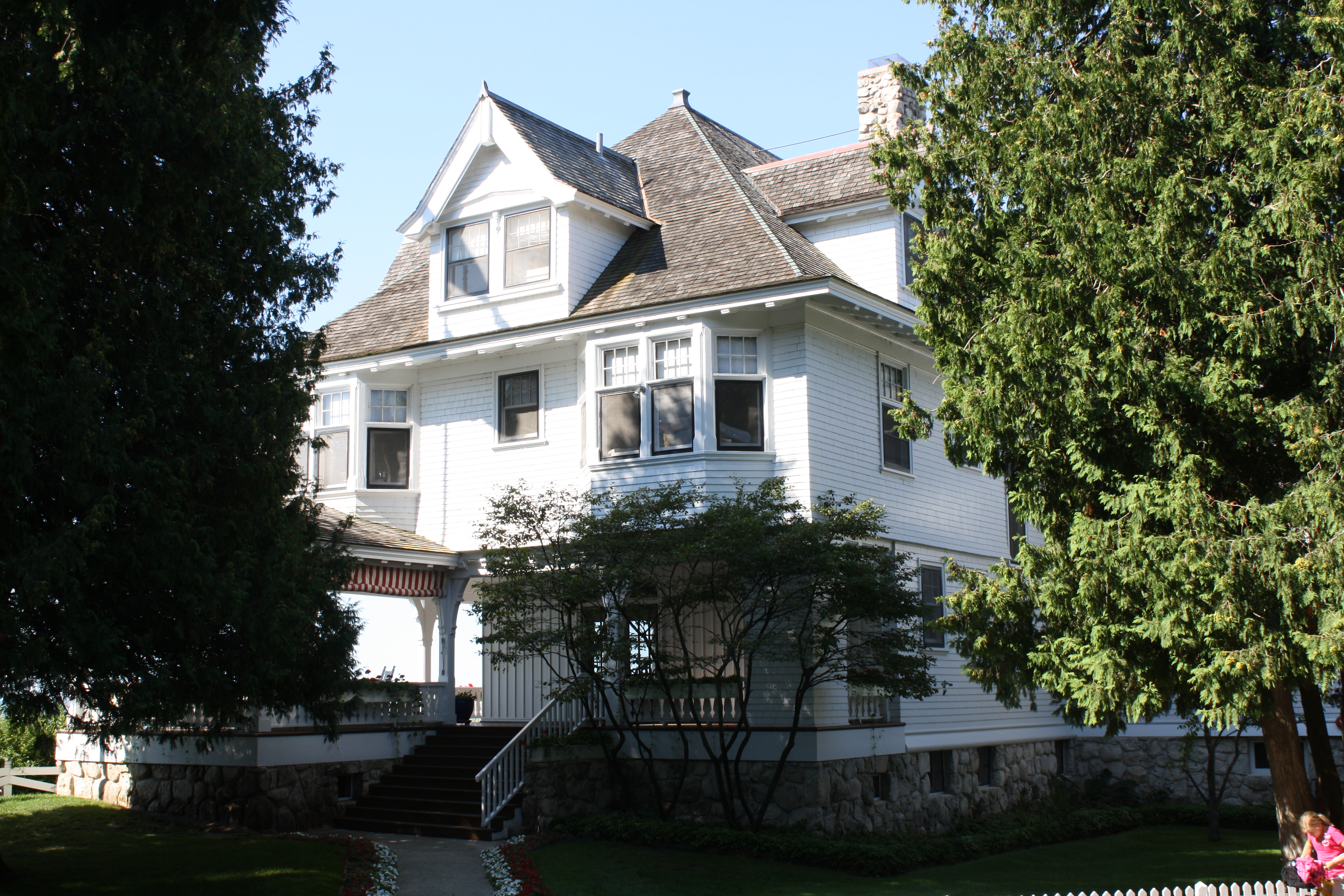
- Michigan Governor's summer residence on Mackinac Island

- Location within Michigan Location within the United States
- Interactive map of Lawrence Andrew Young Cottage
- Location: Jct. of Fort Hill and Huron Rd., Mackinac Island, Michigan
- Coordinates: 45°51′6″N 84°37′13″W
- Area: 1.6 acres (0.65 ha)
- Built: 1901
- Built by: Patrick Doud
- Architect: Frederick W. Perkins
- Architectural style: Arts and Crafts
- NRHP reference No.: 97000800
- Added to NRHP: November 17, 1997

The Michigan Governor's Summer Residence, also known as the Lawrence A. Young Cottage, is a house located at the junction of Fort Hill and Huron roads on Mackinac Island, Michigan. It was listed on the National Register of Historic Places in 1997.

== History ==
In 1895, the Mackinac Island State Park Commission voted to lease cottage sites on Mackinac Island, with the stipulation that lessees must construct a cottage worth at least $3000 on the site within one year. The fourth such lease was issued in 1901 to Chicago attorney Lawrence Andrew Young. Young retained architect Frederick W. Perkins to design the house and hired contractor Patrick Doud to construct it.

The house was owned later by the Hugo Scherer family of Detroit. In 1944, the Mackinac Island State Park Commission purchased the home for its original cost of $15,000. Since then, the commission has provided the care and maintenance of the residence and surrounding gardens, and the cottage has served as the official Michigan governor's summer residence. The house has hosted multiple significant overnight guests, including presidents Harry S. Truman, Gerald R. Ford, and George H. W. Bush.

The residence was refurbished and repaired during John Engler's second term in office. Later renovations were conducted in 2011 and 2012.

== Description ==
The governor's summer residence is a three-story, L-shaped, Arts and Crafts structure located on a bluff overlooking the Straits of Mackinac. It has a stone foundation and full basement, with the third floor built into the wood shingled hipped roof. The walls and roof are finished with wood shingles, while the chimneys and basement walls are constructed from large limestone rocks.

The main facade, overlooking the village below, is symmetrical, with shingled corners and a recessed veranda. The rear wall of the porch is finished with board and batten siding, and contains large windows. The second floor above is shingled, and there are three dormers on the upper floor. One of the side facade has two massive chimneys and a small enclosed porch. The rear facade features a recessed kitchen porch. The remaining facade holds the main entrance, and contains both a recessed porch with shingled corners and another protruding porch. Above, the second floor has two large bay windows, and there is a large dormer above.

On the interior, the main floor contains a large dining room and living room, along with a sun room, servant's dining room, kitchen, rear entry and stair hall, a kitchen pantry and a butler's pantry. The living room has a staircase which wraps around a fireplace. The second floor has five bedrooms, four bathrooms, and a play room. The third floor originally had four bedrooms and one bathroom for servants. It has been remodeled to contain two additional bedrooms, with one of the original bedrooms converted to a bathroom. The house also has a full basement, and contains approximately 7,100 square feet.

The interior features U.S. Southern yellow pine. The house retains many original fixtures and furnishings, including the Young family crystal in a leaded-glass china cupboard located in the dining room and a tall case clock in the living room.

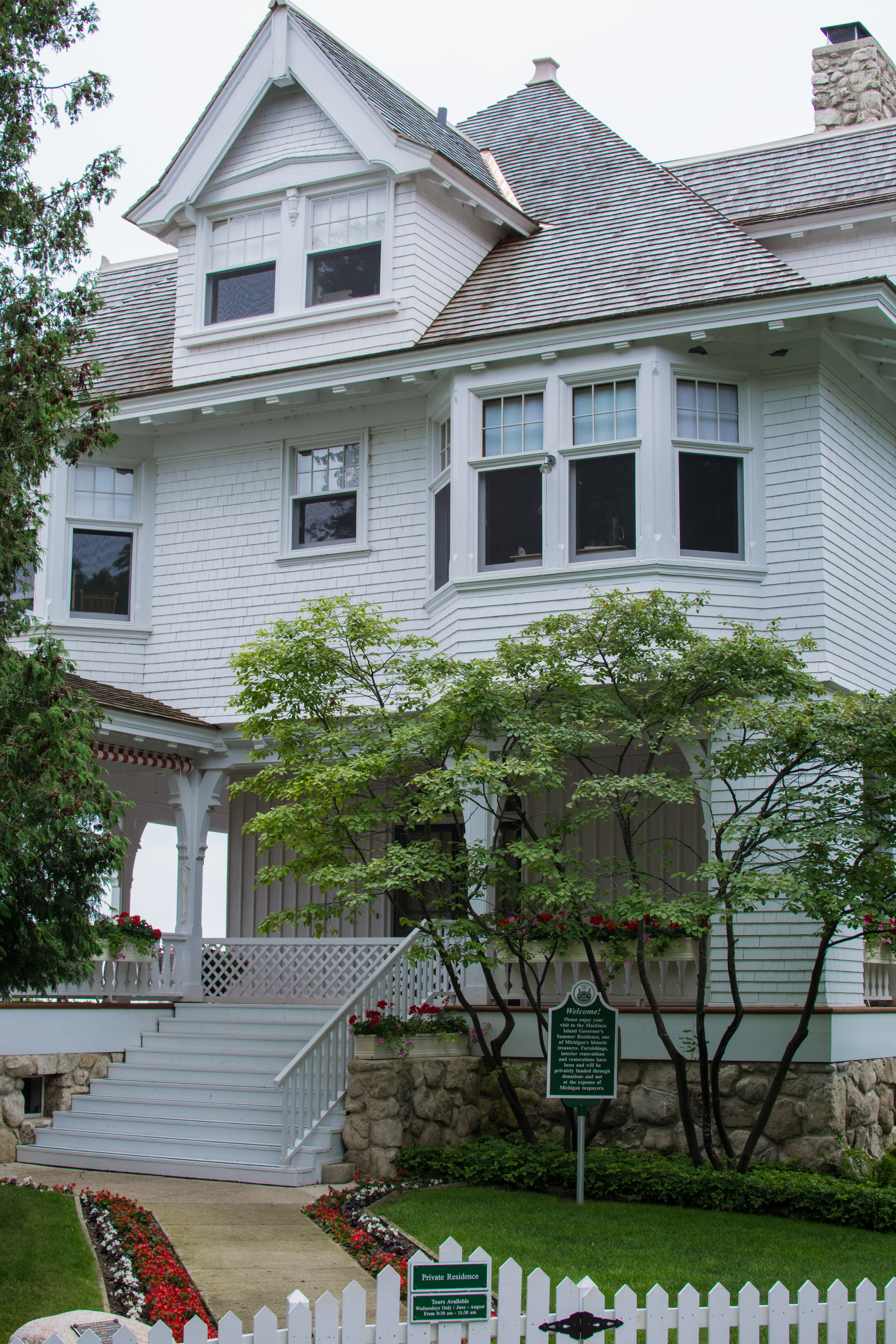
The Governors House on Mackinac Island. The Governor of Michigan, while in office, can use this residence as a vacation home.

== See also ==
- Michigan Governor's Mansion
- Governor's Mansion (Marshall, Michigan)
