= Governor John L. Pennington House =

Historic house in South Dakota, United States

- U.S. National Register of Historic Places
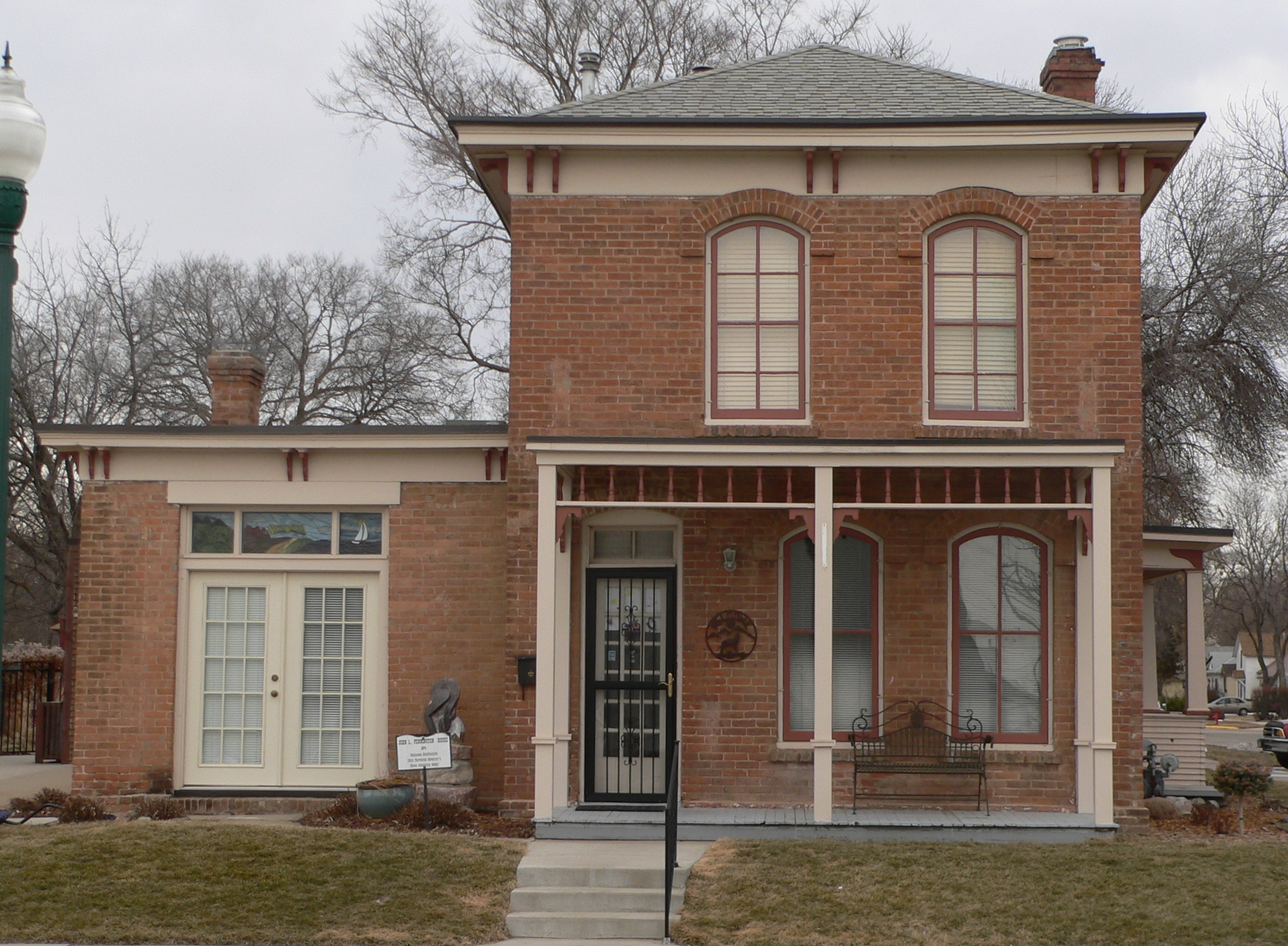
- Pennington House, seen from Third Street

- Location within South Dakota Location within the United States
- Location: 410 E. Third St., Yankton, South Dakota
- Coordinates: 42°52′12″N 97°23′8″W
- Area: less than one acre
- Built: 1875
- Architectural style: Italianate
- NRHP reference No.: 88000025
- Added to NRHP: February 8, 1988

The Governor John L. Pennington House, at 410 E. Third St. in Yankton, South Dakota, was built in 1875. Also known as South Dakota Magazine Office in 1987, it is a simplified Italianate-style building. It was registered with the National Register of Historic Places in 1988.

It was home during 1875 to 1891 of Dakota Territory governor John L. Pennington who served as governor for a four-year term from 1874 to 1878.

== See also ==
- Governor Leslie Jensen House, Hot Spring, South Dakota, also NRHP-listed
- Governor William J. Bulow House, Beresford, South Dakota, also NRHP-listed
