= Michigan Governor's Mansion =

Building in Michigan, United States

General information
- Location: Lansing, Michigan, U.S.
- Coordinates: 42.71946°N 84.5859°W
- Completed: 1957

The Michigan Governor's Mansion is the primary residence of the Governor of Michigan. It is a gated mansion in a secured area of a private neighborhood of Lansing, within the U.S. state of Michigan. The Michigan Constitution specifies that there is to be a governor's residence at the seat of government and that the seat of government shall be at Lansing.

There is also the Michigan Governor's Summer Residence, located on Mackinac Island. Both residences are owned by the state of Michigan and are maintained with private donations.

== Primary residence ==
The governor's mansion in Lansing was built in 1957 for Howard and Letha Sober, who donated it to the state in 1969. The furnishings were provided by the State of Michigan. American architect Wallace Frost, who was known for traditional architecture, designed the ranch-style residence with its stone exterior in a contemporary style. The contemporary architecture was a change from his usual style. A garden room was added in the mid-1970's. The gated mansion sits on approximately four acres of secured area in the Moores River Drive estates of Lansing near the scenic Grand River. Governors who have lived in the mansion during their office tenure include William Milliken, James Blanchard, John Engler, Jennifer Granholm, and current Governor Gretchen Whitmer. The mansion in Lansing was renovated during the early 2000s and contains 10,300 sq ft (960 m^{2}), five bedrooms, and four baths. Governor Rick Snyder elected to remain at his Ann Arbor residence and used the official residence only for occasional ceremonial functions during his tenure from 2011 to 2019.

== Summer residence ==
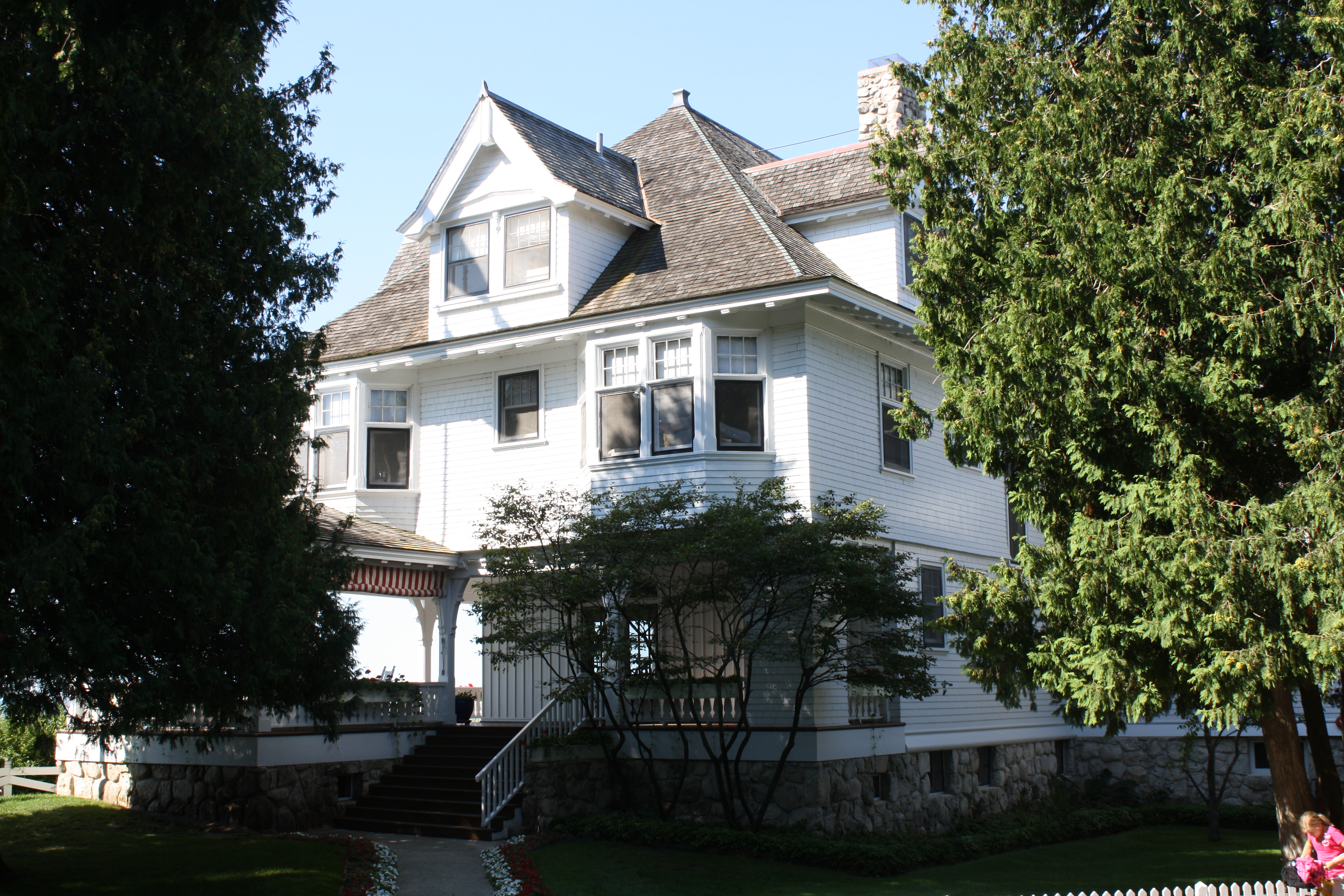
Summer Residence

The Michigan Governor's Summer Residence on Mackinac Island is a three-story structure located on a bluff overlooking the Straits of Mackinac. It was originally built as a private residence for Chicago attorney Lawrence Andrew Young. In 1944, the Mackinac Island State Park Commission purchased the home for its original cost of $15,000. Since then, Michigan's governors have used this home to host important events with national and state leaders. That house was named to the National Register of Historic Places in 1997.

== See also ==
- Governor's Mansion (Marshall, Michigan)
