= New Mexico Governor's Mansion =

Official residence in Santa Fe, New Mexico

Governor's Mansion
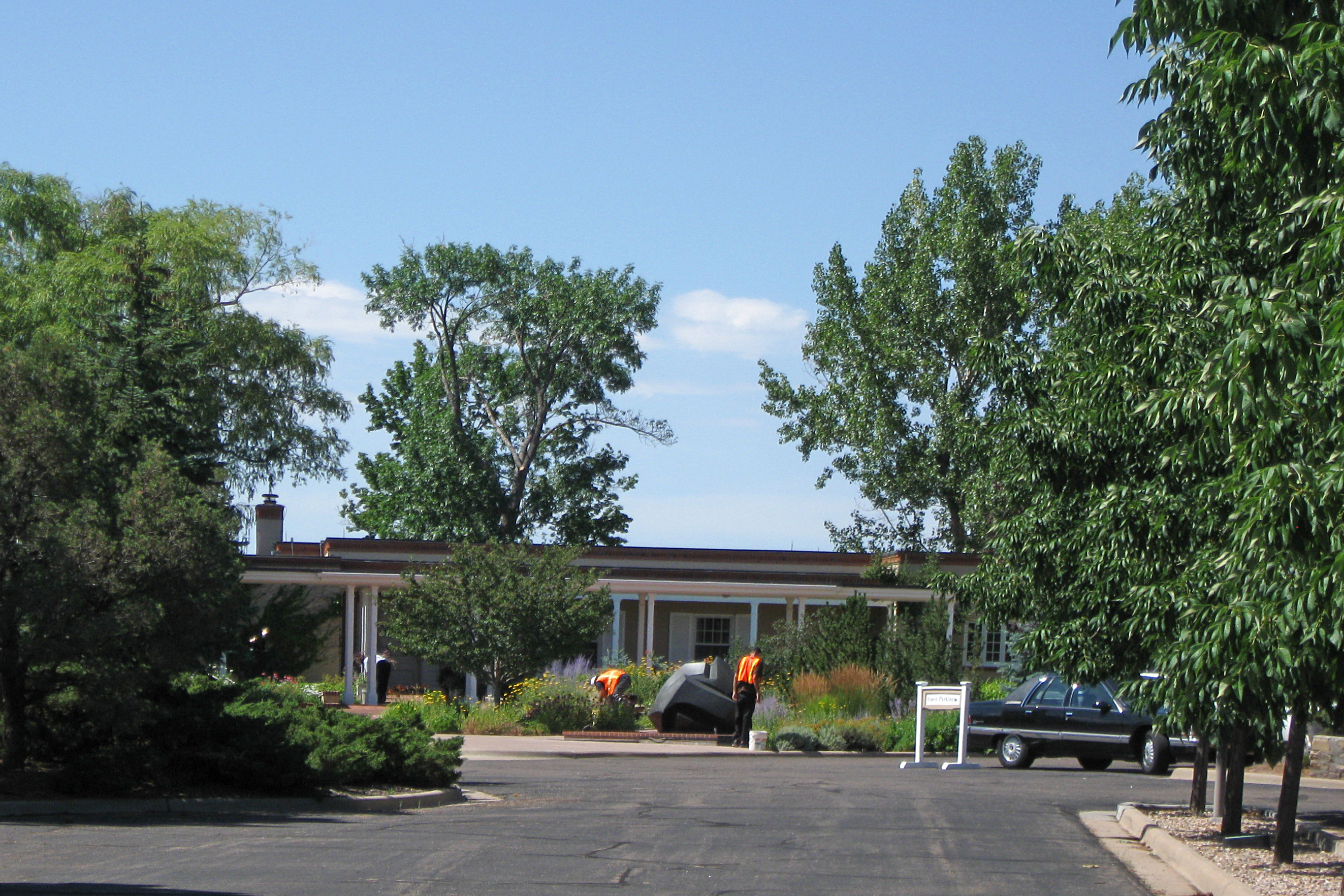
- The Governor's Residence, located at 1 Mansion Drive in Santa Fe.
- Interactive map of the Governor's Mansion area

General information
- Architectural style: Territorial Style
- Location: 1 Mansion Drive
- Coordinates: 35.702992°N 105.930274°W
- Owner: General Services Department, Government of New Mexico

Website
- Official website

The New Mexico Governor's Residence is the official residence of the governor of New Mexico and their family. The current structure, located at 1 Mansion Drive in Santa Fe, New Mexico, has served as the Governor's official residence since 1954. It is the third home to serve this function.

== History ==
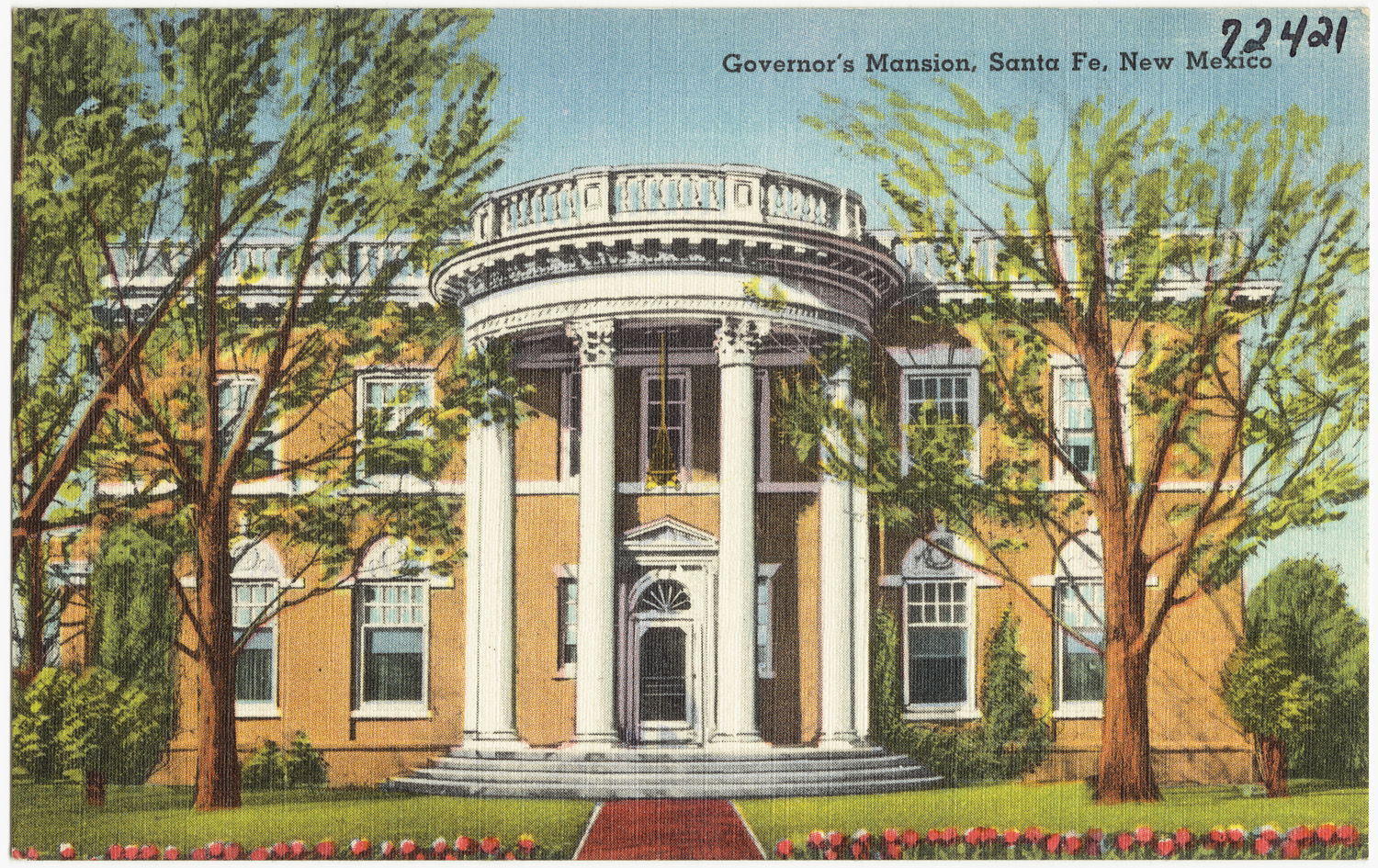
The Governor's Residence from 1870 to 1940

Prior to 1954, the Governor's Residence was located in downtown Santa Fe, adjacent to the New Mexico State Capitol. It featured neoclassical architecture and was meant to resemble the White House but was painted a light tan color. This home had expansive gardens and a fish pond. By 1950, however, the mansion was in severe disrepair and the New Mexico Legislature authorized funds for a new residence that same year.

Before the second home's construction, and dating back to the period of Spanish colonization, governors of New Mexico resided at the Palace of the Governors in Santa Fe. This adobe structure, constructed in 1610, remains standing today and is now a museum and tourist attraction. The palace is the oldest continuously occupied public building in the United States, having been in continuous use for over 400 years.
