= Shaikh Isa Palace =

Palace in Riffa, Bahrain

- Location within Bahrain

General information
- Type: Palace
- Location: Riffa, Bahrain
- Coordinates: 26°7′17″N 50°31′29″E

Shaikh Isa Palace is a palace in western Bahrain. The Palace lies just northeast of Al Rawda Palace in Riffa.
