= A. celebensis =

A. celebensis may refer to:

- Ambulyx celebensis, a moth species
- Amplypterus celebensis, a moth species
- Antheraea celebensis, a moth species
