= Tussar silk =

Coarse silk from wild Antheraea silkworms

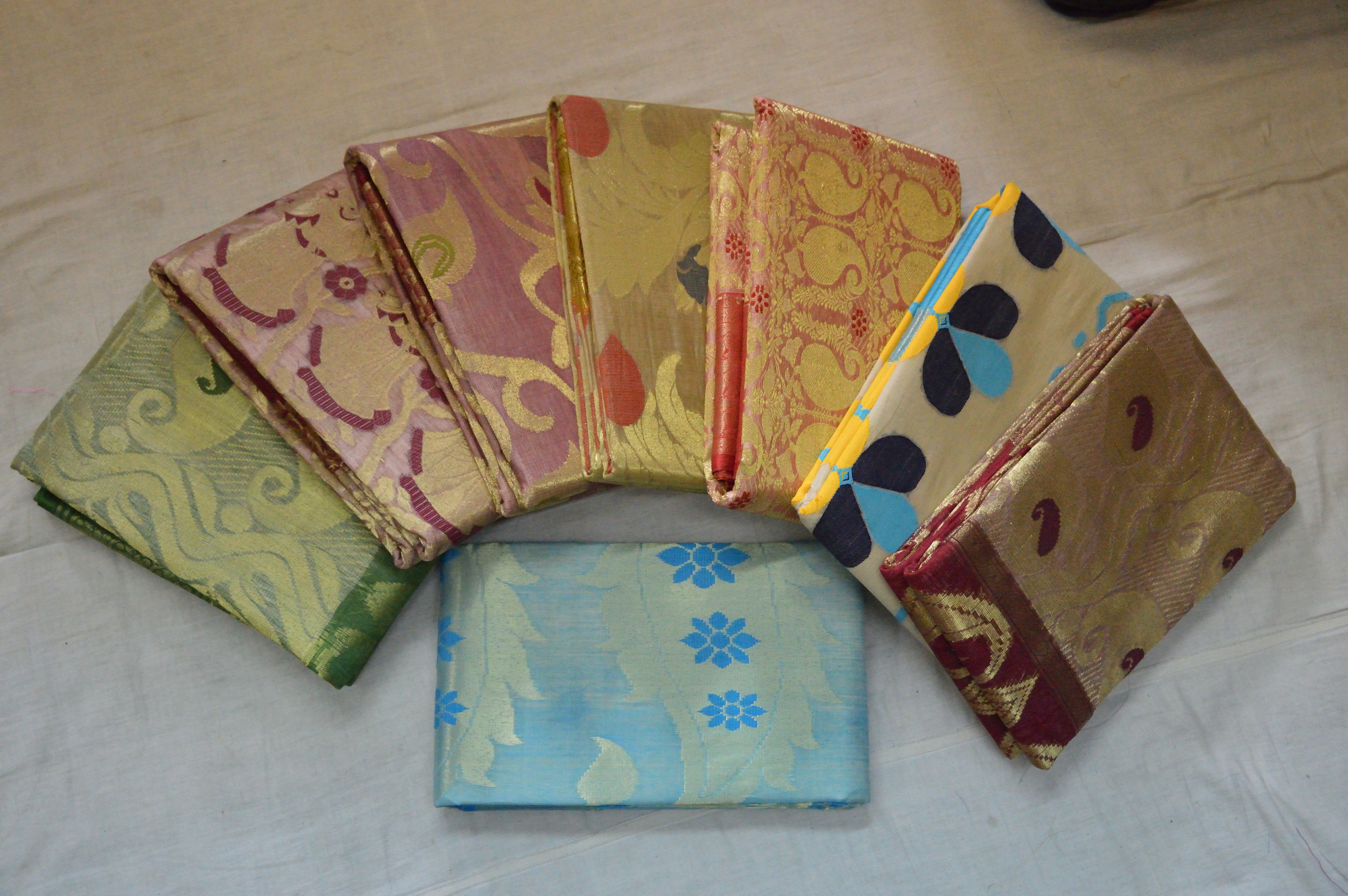
Tussore silk sarees from Phulia, Nadia, India.

Tussar silk (Note: alternatively spelled as tussah, tushar, tassar, tussore, tasar, tussur, or tusser) (Sanskrit: kosa) is a type of wild silk, produced from the larvae of Antheraea silkworms, including A. assamensis, A. paphia, A. pernyi, A. roylei, and A. yamamai. These silkworms live in the wild in forest trees belonging to Terminalia species and Shorea robusta, as well as other food plants such as jamun and oak found in South Asia, eating the leaves of the trees on which they live. Tussar silk is valued for its rich texture and natural, deep-gold colour, and varieties are produced in many countries, including China, India, Japan, and Sri Lanka.

== Process ==
To kill the silkworms, the cocoons are dried in the sun. A variation of the process exists in which the silkworms are allowed to leave before the cocoons are soaked in boiling water to soften the silk, and then the fibers are reeled. Single-shelled, oval-shaped cocoons are collected and then boiled to extract the silk yarn. Boiling is a very important part of the manufacturing of silk, as it softens the cocoon and makes the extraction of silk easier. In conventional sericulture, the cocoons are boiled with the larvae still inside, but if the cocoons are boiled after the larvae have left them, the silk made is then called "nonviolent silk" or "Ahimsa silk". In China, the silks are given different names when silkworms are reared on different plants, as the diet of the silkworms has an effect on the quality of the silk. For example, silk from larvae on the wild mulberry is called zhe, while those on the oak Quercus dentata produce hu.

Tussar silk is considered more textured than cultivated Bombyx or "mulberry" silk, but it has shorter fibres, which makes it less durable. It has a dull, gold sheen. As most of the cocoons are collected from the forest, it is considered by many as a forest product.

== Production in India ==
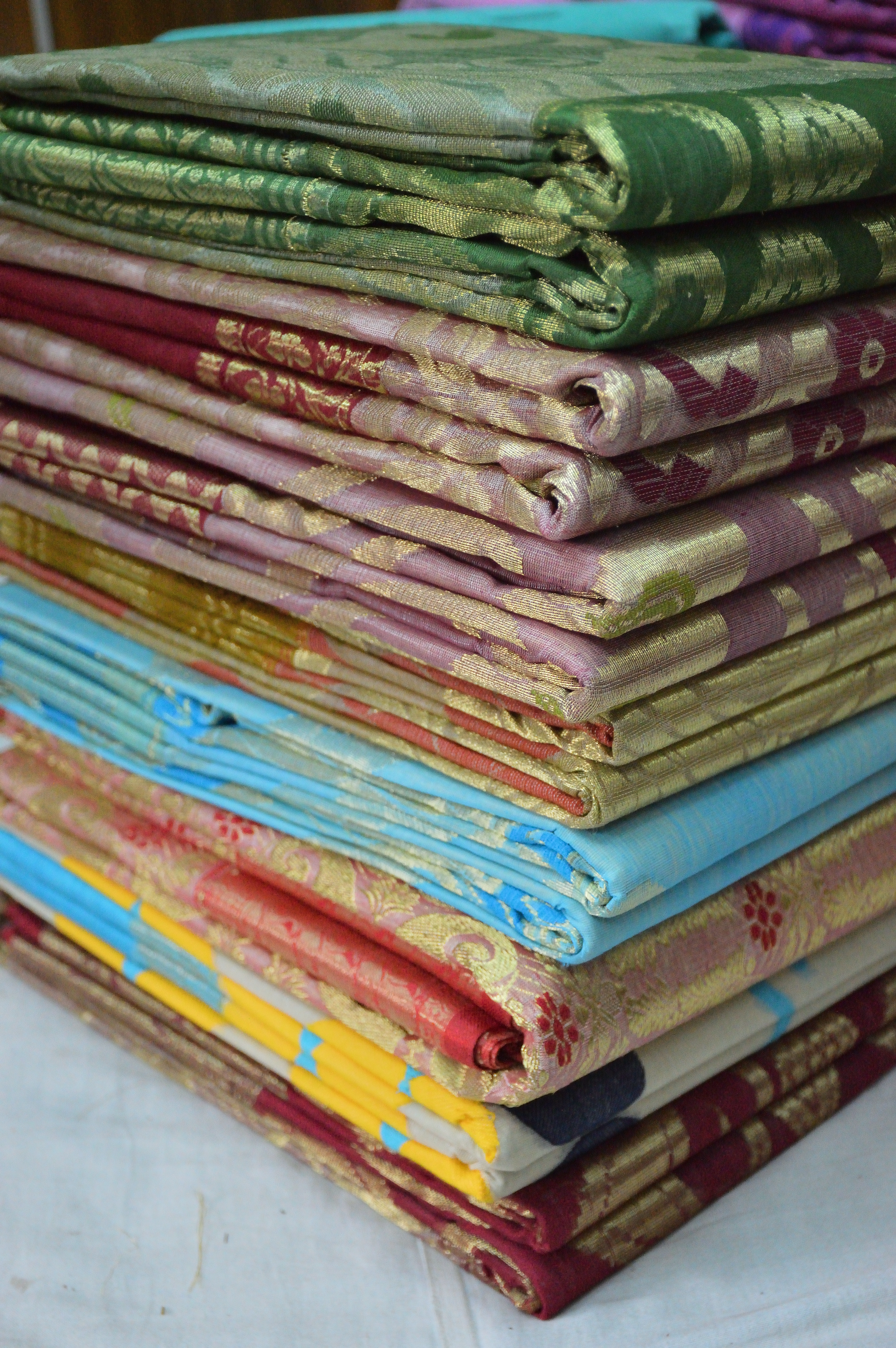
Tussar sarees

India is the second-largest producer of tussar silk, and the exclusive producer of Indian tussar (also known as tropical tussar), which is largely tended to by tribals. Much of it is produced in Bhagalpur (where it is called Bhagalpur silk), Bihar, and Malda district of West Bengal. Tussar silk is also used for Odisha's pattachitra and West Bengal's kantha stitches. Chhattisgarh and Madhya Pradesh also produce tussar silk. In recent years, the state of Jharkhand has emerged as the biggest producer of tussar silk.

=== Bhagalpur silk ===
The tussar silk-weaving industry in Bhagalpur, more than a century old, has about 30,000 handloom weavers working on some 25,000 handlooms. The total value of annual trade is around Rs 100 crores, about half of which comes from exports.

== Uses ==
The saree is the most important tussar silk product although it is also used as the base material for handicrafts, furnishing fabrics, and stitched apparel.

With the introduction of chemical dyes, the range of available colors has increased significantly. Some fashion designers use tussar silk in their creations. The precisely finished and designer garments produced from tussar silk are known globally and are exported worldwide.

Tussar silk is a popular additive to soap. The short silk fibers are typically dissolved in lye water, which is then added to oils to make soap. Soap made with tussar silk has a "slippery" quality and is considered more luxurious-feeling than soap made without. Tussar silk roving can be bought at soapmaking supply stores.
