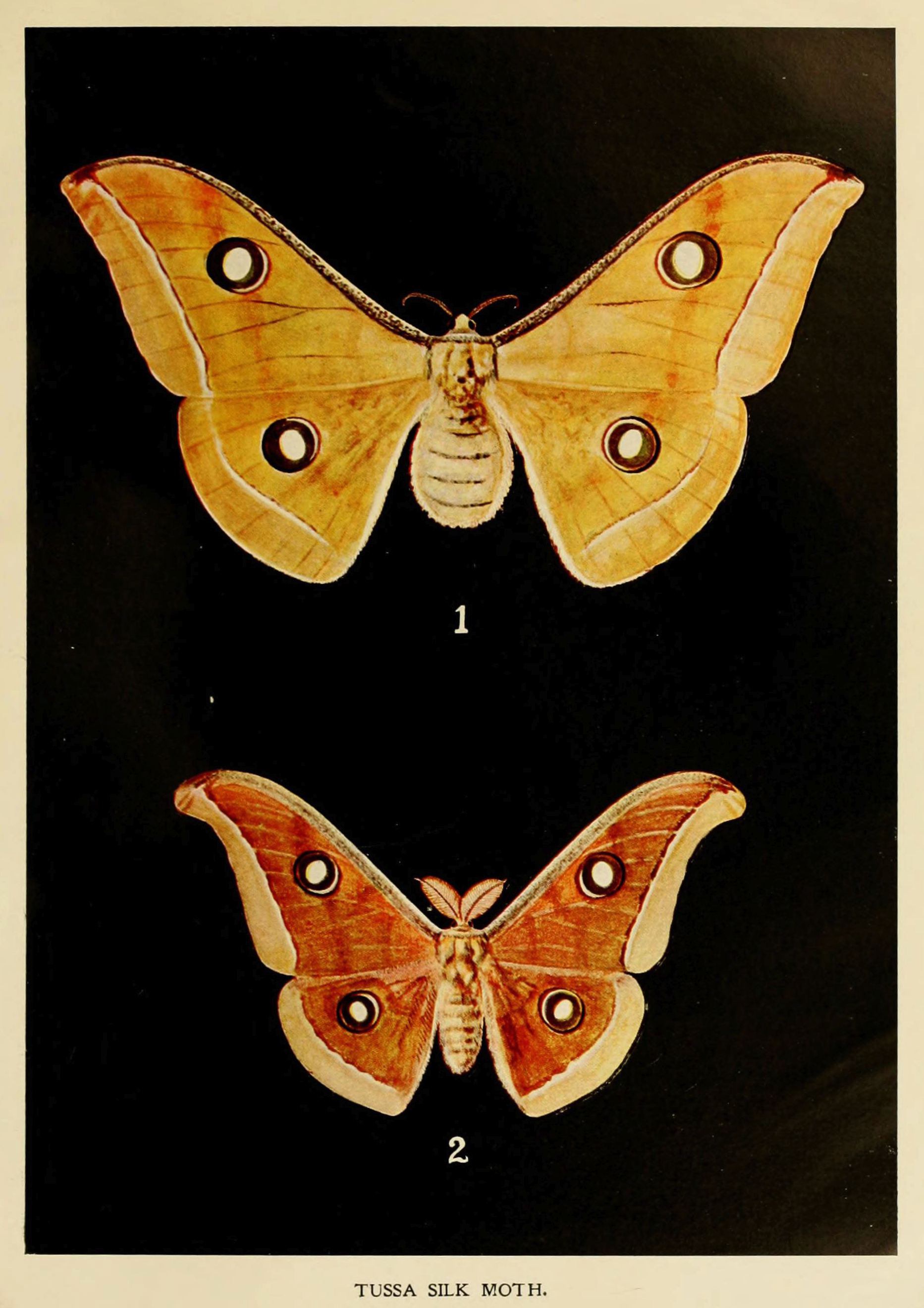
- Illustration of adult female (above) and male (below)

Scientific classification
- Kingdom: Animalia
- Phylum: Arthropoda
- Class: Insecta
- Order: Lepidoptera
- Family: Saturniidae
- Genus: Antheraea
- Species: A. paphia

Binomial name
- Antheraea paphia (Linnaeus, 1758)

Synonyms
- Phalaena (Bombyx) paphia Linnaeus, 1758; Phalaena (Attacus) mylitta Drury, 1773; Antheraea mylitta (Drury, 1773)

= Antheraea paphia =

Species of moth

Antheraea paphia, known as the South India small tussore, the tasar silkworm and vanya silkworm is a species of moth of the family Saturniidae found in India and Sri Lanka. There are also populations in Pakistan, Myanmar, Bangladesh, Bhutan and Nepal. The bulk of the literature on this species uses a junior synonym, Antheraea mylitta, rather than the correct name, A. paphia. It is one of a number of tasar silkworms, species that produce Tussar silk, a kind of wild silk that is made from the products of saturniid silkworms instead of the domesticated silkworm (Bombyx mori).

This species is variable, with at least 44 identified ecoraces, populations adapted to varied ecological conditions and food plants. Ten ecoraces are used for silk production and have been studied to obtain data about their life cycles and silk characteristics. Some ecoraces are so well differentiated that they do not interbreed in nature, though they are not genetically distinct and can be bred in captivity.

== Description ==
The male is reddish or yellowish. Costal brown and grey fascia of forewings reaching the apex. Hyaline and ocellated spots (eyespots) are much larger than those of A. roylei. The submarginal line of the hind wings close to the margin. No marginal yellow line is seen. Females may be pinkish-brown or bright-yellowish fawn; their hyaline and ocellated spots are larger than the males. Larvae are green colored with paired dorsal series of yellow humps. White lunulate spots on the fifth and sixth somites have purple borders, whereas a lateral yellow line from seventh somite ends in a dilated brown band on the anal somite. Spiracles are yellow. The cocoon is brownish grey, hard, and oval, attached to the host plant by a silken peduncle.

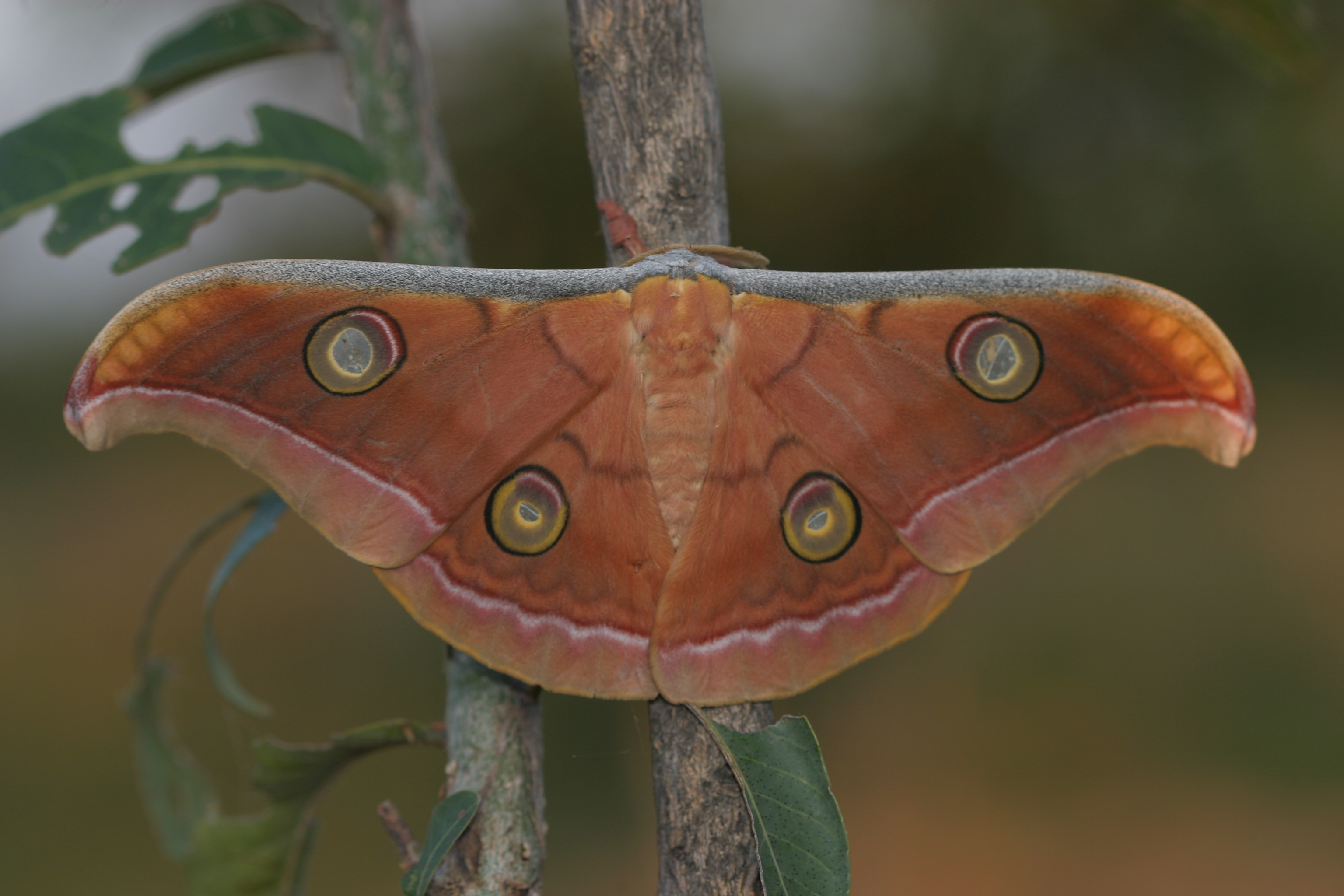
Adult male

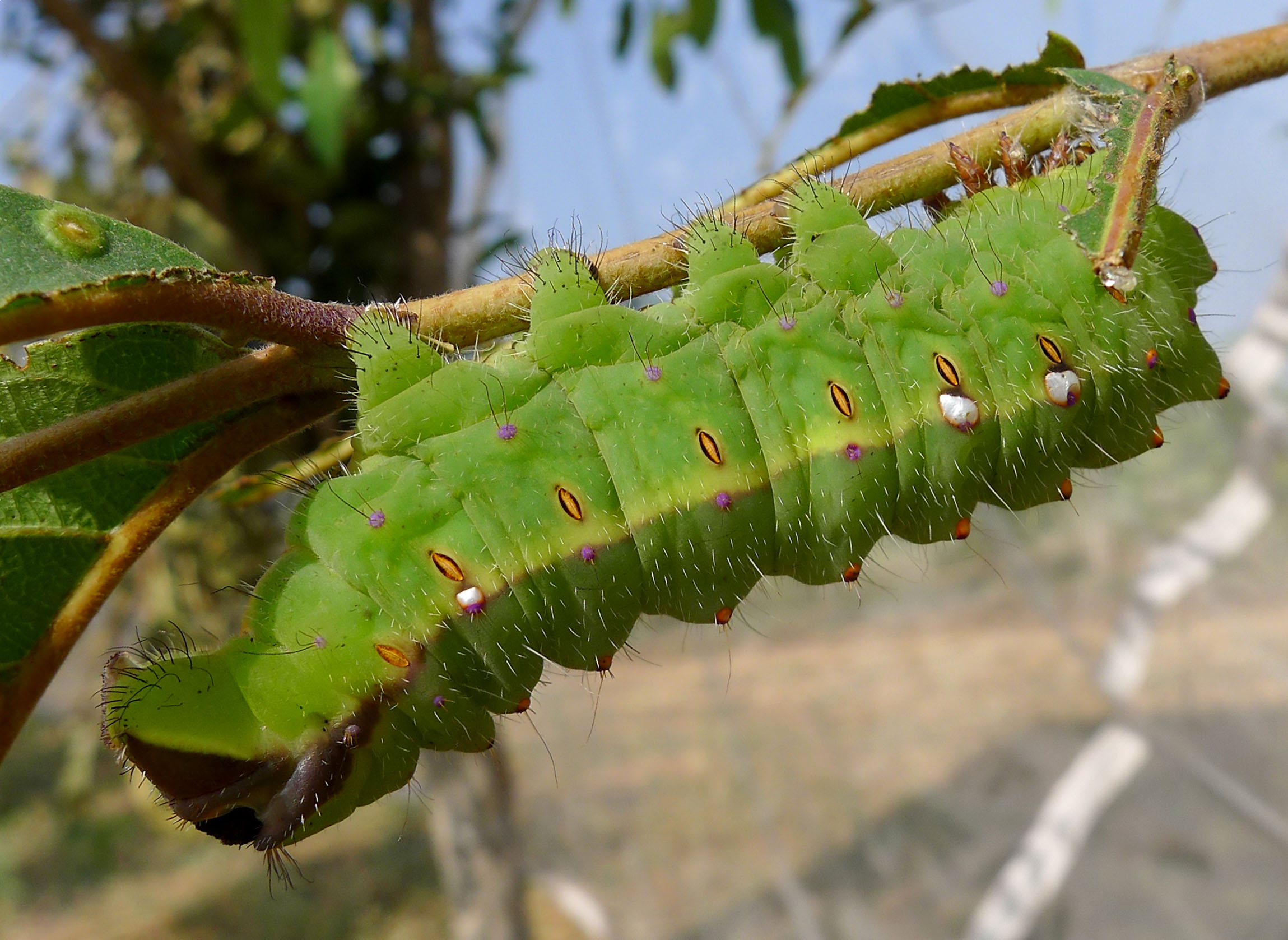
Larva

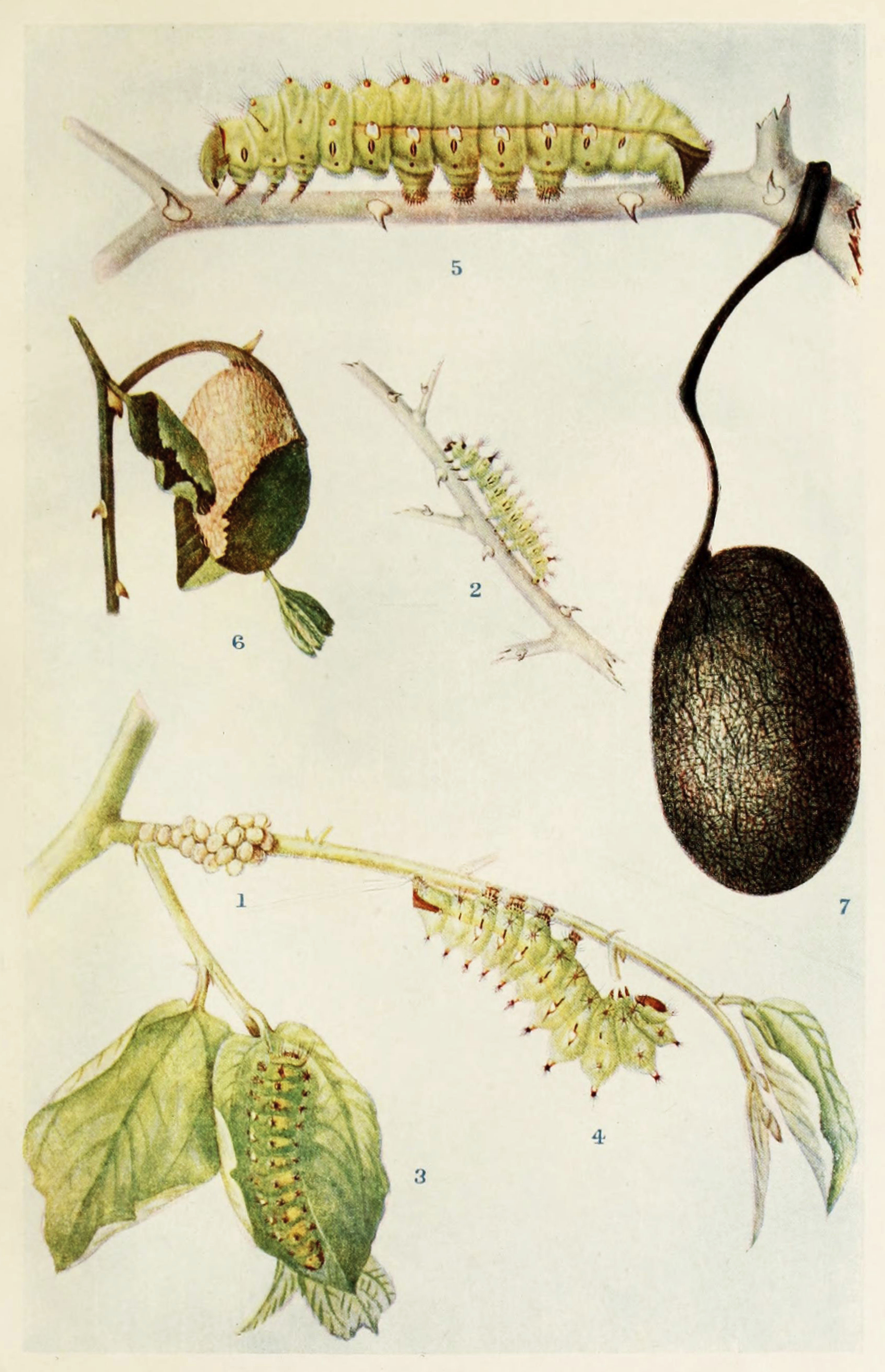
Illustration of larvae and pupae

== Ecology ==
Larvae of this species feed mainly on Terminalia trees (e.g. Terminalia tomentosa, T. arjuna) and on Shorea robusta. It also eats many other kinds of plants, with various ecoraces specializing on certain taxa. Other plants appearing in its diet include Indian jujube (Ziziphus mauritiana), axlewood (Anogeissus latifolia), jambul (Syzygium cumini), Madhuca indica, kumbi (Careya arborea), anjan (Hardwickia binata), and species of teak (Tectona spp.) and crepe myrtle (Lagerstroemia spp.).

Tussar silk from this and related species of wild silkworms is a different color from domesticated silkworm silk, and it is coarser and stronger, making it more favorable in some applications.

Like the domesticated silkworm, this species is susceptible to pébrine, a disease caused by microsporidian fungi in the genus Nosema. It is lethal to the larvae. It is also commonly infected with the Antheraea mylitta cytoplasmic polyhedrosis virus" (AmCPV), a cypovirus which has been reported to destroy around 20% of each silk crop by inducing diarrhea in the larvae, leading to a condition known as grasserie. Natural enemies of this silkworm include the uzi fly (Blepharipa zebina), which is a parasitoid that uses the silkworm larvae as a food source for its maggots.

Many ecoraces are threatened due to extensive deforestation and the collection of cocoons from wild populations.
