= Antheraea cihangiri =

Scientific classification
- Domain: Eukaryota
- Kingdom: Animalia
- Phylum: Arthropoda
- Class: Insecta
- Order: Lepidoptera
- Family: Saturniidae
- Genus: Antheraea
- Species: A. cihangiri

Binomial name
- Antheraea cihangiri Naumann & Nässig, 1998

Species of moth

Antheraea cihangiri is a moth of the family Saturniidae found in Pulau Peleng.
