= Antheraea korintjiana =

Scientific classification
- Kingdom: Animalia
- Phylum: Arthropoda
- Class: Insecta
- Order: Lepidoptera
- Family: Saturniidae
- Genus: Antheraea
- Species: A. korintjiana

Binomial name
- Antheraea korintjiana Bouvier, 1928

Synonyms
- Antheraea roylei korintjiana; Antheraea pernyi korintjiana

Species of moth

Antheraea korintjiana is a moth of the family Saturniidae first described by Eugène Louis Bouvier in 1928. It is found in Borneo, Sumatra and Peninsular Malaysia. The larvae probably feed on Betula, Cyperus, Daphniphyllum, Quercus, Malus, Prunus, Pyrus, and Euodia.
