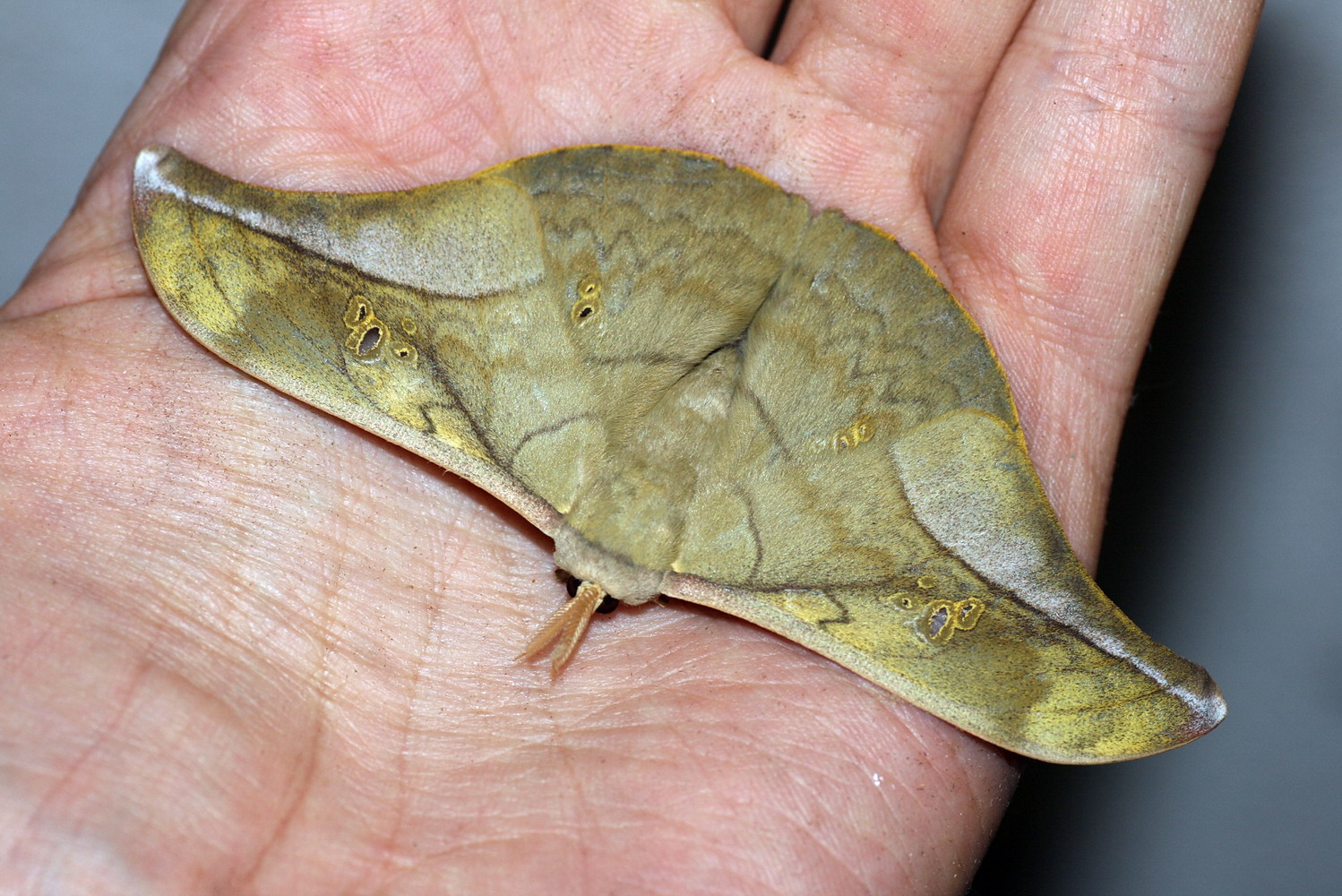

Scientific classification
- Domain: Eukaryota
- Kingdom: Animalia
- Phylum: Arthropoda
- Class: Insecta
- Order: Lepidoptera
- Family: Saturniidae
- Genus: Antheraea
- Species: A. rosieri

Binomial name
- Antheraea rosieri (Toxopeus, 1940)

Synonyms
- Loepantheraea rosieri Toxopeus, 1940

= Antheraea rosieri =

Species of moth

Antheraea rosieri is a moth of the family Saturniidae first described by Lambertus Johannes Toxopeus in 1940. It is found in Sumatra, Peninsular Malaysia and Borneo.
