= Antheraea cingalesa =

Scientific classification
- Kingdom: Animalia
- Phylum: Arthropoda
- Clade: Pancrustacea
- Class: Insecta
- Order: Lepidoptera
- Family: Saturniidae
- Genus: Antheraea
- Species: A. cingalesa

Binomial name
- Antheraea cingalesa Moore, 1883

Species of moth

Antheraea cingalesa, the Sri Lankan tussar silk moth, is a moth of the family Saturniidae. The species was first described by Frederic Moore in 1883. It is endemic to Sri Lanka.

== Description ==
Its wingspan is 12 to 16 cm. Sexes show dimorphism. Male is deep yellowish ochreous or reddish ochreous. Round celli are with a black outer ring, purple inner border and white line. Forewings much paler with ochreous apex. Costal border hoary with a very indistinct darker ochreous shade. Whereas female is deep yellowish ochreous. Ocelli are larger than that of male. Front of the thorax, and collar are hoary.

The caterpillar is greenish with a yellow lateral band. There are two dorsal rows of yellow tubercular prominences. Head and forelegs are purple brown. Cocoon oval, hard, and brownish grey. Host plants of the caterpillar are Anacardium occidentale, Terminalia arjuna, Terminalia catappa, Camellia sinensis, Eucalyptus leucoxylon and Hevea brasiliensis.
