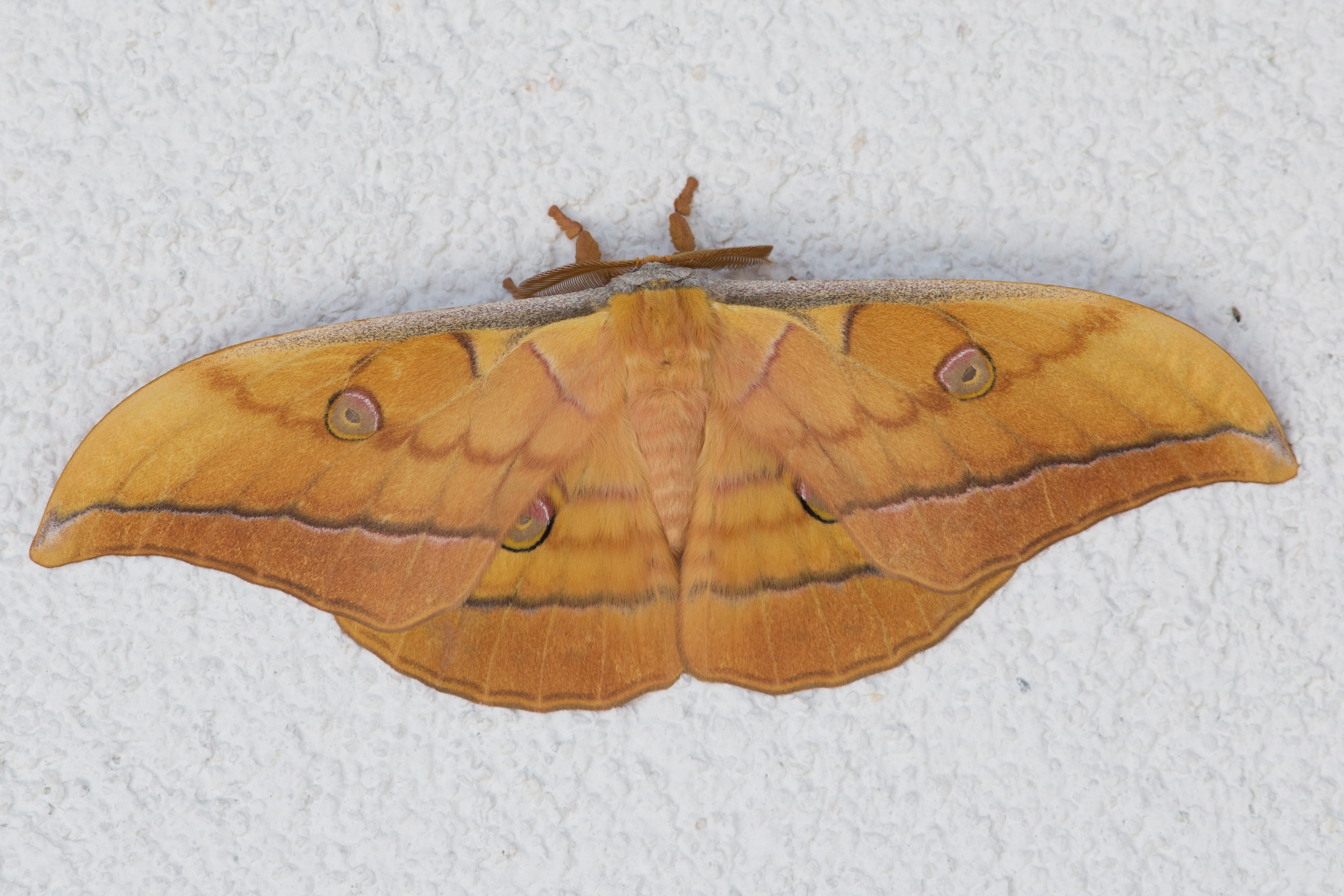
- Antheraea yamamai

Scientific classification
- Kingdom: Animalia
- Phylum: Arthropoda
- Clade: Pancrustacea
- Class: Insecta
- Order: Lepidoptera
- Family: Saturniidae
- Tribe: Saturniini
- Genus: Antheraea; Hübner, 1819

Type species
- Phalaena mylitta Drury, 1773

Species
- See text

Synonyms
- Telea Hübner, [1819]; Metosamia Druce, 1892; Carmenta Weymer, 1906

= Antheraea =

Tussar moths

Genus of moths

Antheraea is a genus of moths belonging to the family Saturniidae. It was erected by Jacob Hübner in 1819. Several species of this genus have caterpillars which produce wild silk of commercial importance. Commonly called "tussar silk", the moths are named tussar moths after the fabric.

== Taxonomy ==
=== Species ===
The genus includes these species:

- Antheraea alleni Holloway, 1987
- Antheraea alorensis U. Paukstadt & L.h. Paukstadt, 2005
- Antheraea andamana Moore, 1877
- Antheraea angustomarginata Brechlin & Meister, 2009
- Antheraea assamensis Helfer, 1837
- Antheraea billitonensis Moore, 1878
- Antheraea broschi Naumann, 2001
- Antheraea brunei Allen & Holloway, 1986
- Antheraea castanea Jordan, 1910 (= A. mezops)
- Antheraea celebensis Watson, 1915
- Antheraea cernyi Brechlin, 2002
- Antheraea cihangiri Naumann & Naessig, 1998
- Antheraea cingalesa Moore, 1883
- Antheraea compta Rothschild, 1899
- Antheraea cordifolia Weymer, 1906
- Antheraea crypta Chu & Wang, 1993
- Antheraea diehli Lemaire, 1979
- Antheraea exspectata Brechlin, 2000
- Antheraea fickei Weymer, 1909
- Antheraea formosana Sonan, 1937
- Antheraea frithi Moore, 1859
- Antheraea fusca Rothschild, 1903
- Antheraea gephyra Niepelt, 1926
- Antheraea godmani (Druce, 1892)
- Antheraea gschwandneri Niepelt, 1918
- Antheraea gulata Naessig & Treadaway, 1998
- Antheraea hagedorni Naumann & Lourens, 2008
- Antheraea halconensis U. Paukstadt & Brosch, 1996
- Antheraea harndti Naumann, 1999
- Antheraea helferi Moore, 1859
- Antheraea hollowayi Naessig & Naumann, 1998
- Antheraea imperator Watson, 1913
- Antheraea jakli Naumann, 2008
- Antheraea jana (Stoll, 1782)
- Antheraea jawabaratensis Brechlin & Paukstadt, 2010
- Antheraea kageri U. Paukstadt, L. Paukstadt & Suhardjono, 1997
- Antheraea kalangensis Brechlin & Meister, 2009
- Antheraea kelimutuensis U. Paukstadt, L. Paukstadt & Suhardjono, 1997
- Antheraea knyvetti Hampson, 1893
- Antheraea korintjiana
- Antheraea lampei Naessig & Holloway, 1989
- Antheraea larissa (Westwood, 1847)
- Antheraea larissoides Bouvier, 1928
- Antheraea lorosae M.D. Lane, Naumann & D.A. Lane, 2004
- Antheraea meisteri Brechlin, 2002
- Antheraea mentawai Naessig, Lampe & Kager, 2002
- Antheraea minahassae Niepelt, 1926
- Antheraea montezuma (Salle, 1856)
- Antheraea moultoni Watson, 1927
- Antheraea myanmarensis U. Paukstadt, L. Paukstadt & Brosch, 1998
- Antheraea mylittoides Bouvier, 1928
- Antheraea pahangensis Brechlin & Paukstadt, 2010
- Antheraea oculea (Neumoegen, 1883)
- Antheraea paphia Linnaeus, 1758 (= A. mylitta)
- Antheraea pasteuri Bouvier, 1928
- Antheraea paukpelengensis Brechlin & Meister, 2009
- Antheraea paukstadtorum Naumann, Holloway & Naessig, 1996
- Antheraea pedunculata Bouvier, 1936
- Antheraea pelengensis Brechlin, 2000
- Antheraea pernyi (Guérin-Méneville, 1855) – Chinese tussar moth
- Antheraea perrottetii (Guérin-Méneville, 1843)
- Antheraea platessa Rothschild, 1903
- Antheraea polyphemus (Cramer, 1775) – Polyphemus moth
- Antheraea pratti Bouvier, 1928
- Antheraea prelarissa Bouvier, 1928
- Antheraea raffrayi Bouvier, 1928
- Antheraea ranakaensis U. Paukstadt, L. Paukstadt & Suhardjono, 1997
- Antheraea rosemariae Holloway, Naessig & Naumann, 1995
- Antheraea rosieri (Toxopeus, 1940)
- Antheraea roylei Moore, 1859
- Antheraea rubicunda Brechlin, 2009
- Antheraea rumphii (Felder, 1861)
- Antheraea schroederi U. Paukstadt, Brosch & L. Paukstadt, 1999
- Antheraea semperi C. & R. Felder, 1861
- Antheraea steinkeorum U. Paukstadt, L. Paukstadt & Brosch, 1999
- Antheraea subcaeca Bouvier, 1928
- Antheraea sumatrana Niepelt, 1926
- Antheraea sumbawaensis Brechlin, 2000
- Antheraea superba Inoue, 1964
- Antheraea surakarta Moore, 1862
- Antheraea taripaensis Naumann, Naessig & Holloway, 1996
- Antheraea tenggarensis Brechlin, 2000
- Antheraea ulrichbroschi U. & L. Paukstadt, 1999
- Antheraea vietnamensis Brechlin & Paukstadt, 2010
- Antheraea viridiscura Holloway, Naessig & Naumann, 1996
- Antheraea yamamai (Guérin-Méneville, 1861) – Japanese oak silk moth

=== Hybrids ===
- Antheraea × proylei (A. pernyi male × A. roylei female)
- Antheraea polyphemus male × Antheraea paphia female (1960 - Gary Botting) (using pheromone transfer)
- Antheraea polyphemus male × Antheraea yamamai female (1959 - Gary Botting) (using pheromone transfer)
