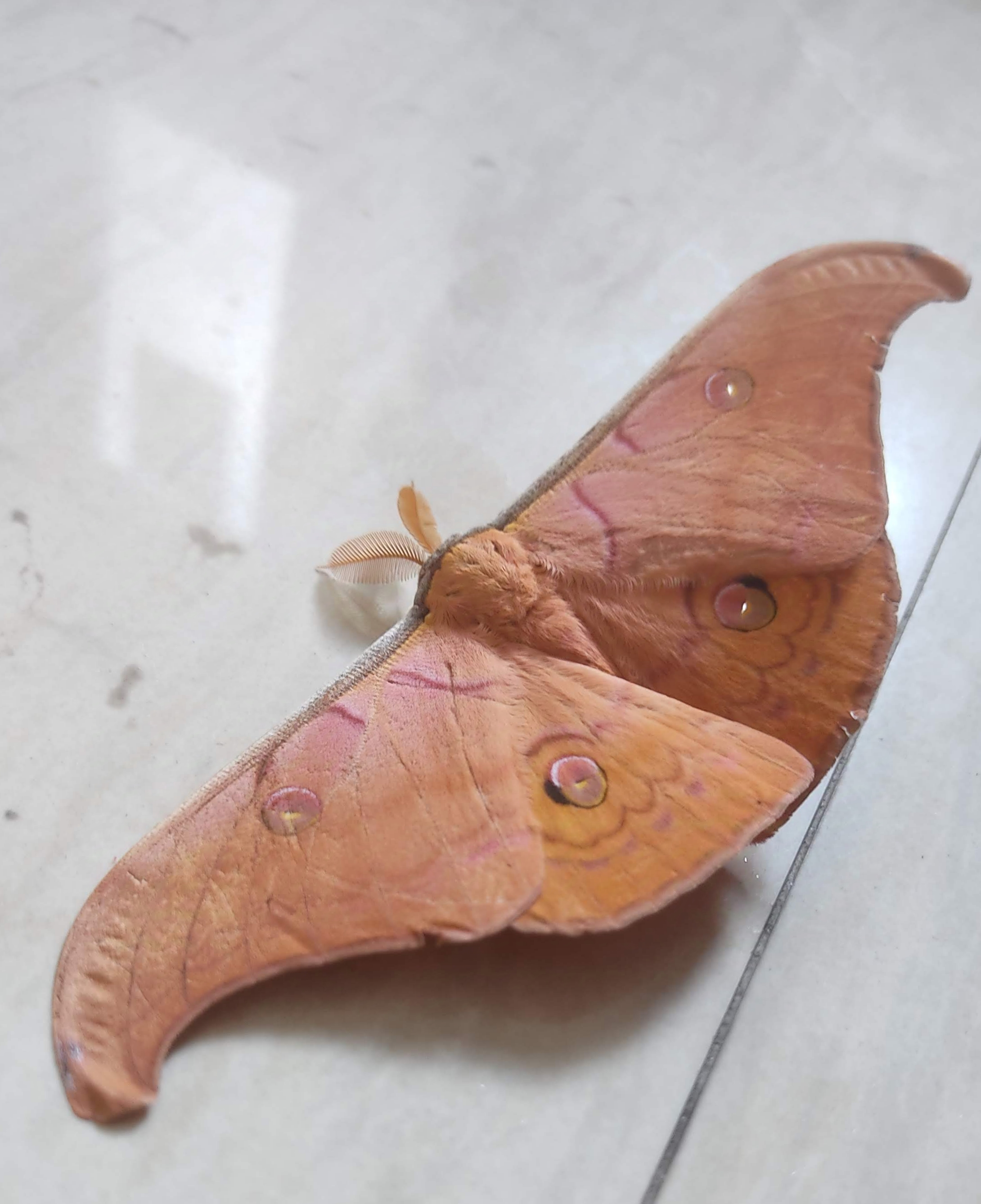
- Antheraea helferi (Saturniidae) founded in Sikkim, India

Scientific classification
- Domain: Eukaryota
- Kingdom: Animalia
- Phylum: Arthropoda
- Class: Insecta
- Order: Lepidoptera
- Family: Saturniidae
- Genus: Antheraea
- Species: A. helferi

Binomial name
- Antheraea helferi Moore, 1858

Synonyms
- Antheraea borneensis; Antheraea imperator; Antheraea helferi javanensis; Antheraea helferi borneensis

= Antheraea helferi =

Species of moth

Antheraea helferi is a moth of the family Saturniidae first described by Frederic Moore in 1858. It is found in the north-eastern Himalaya and Sundaland.

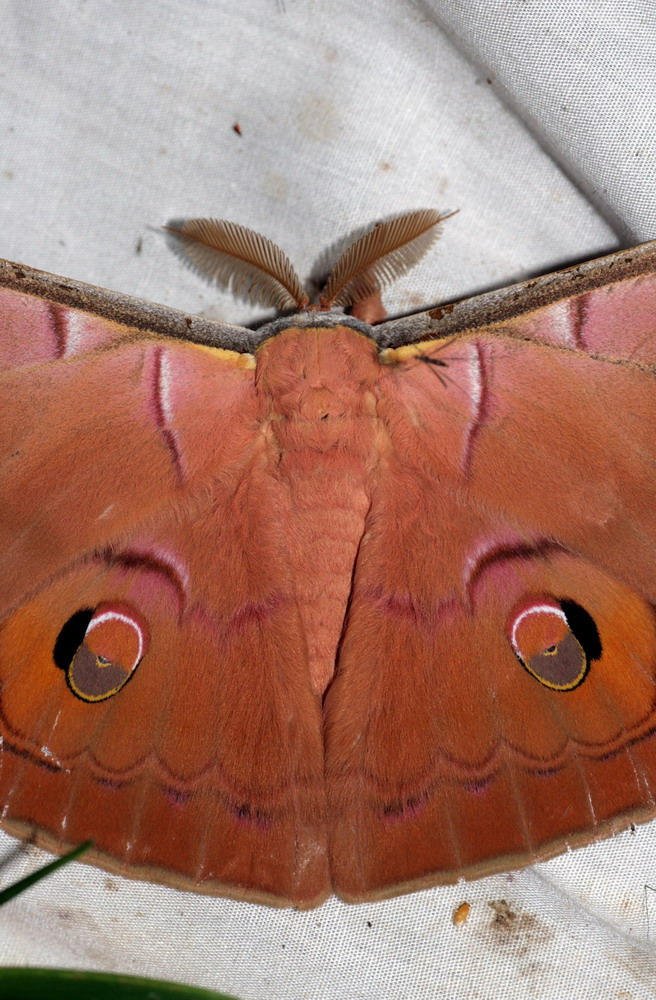
Close-up
