= Antheraea diehli =

Scientific classification
- Domain: Eukaryota
- Kingdom: Animalia
- Phylum: Arthropoda
- Class: Insecta
- Order: Lepidoptera
- Family: Saturniidae
- Genus: Antheraea
- Species: A. diehli

Binomial name
- Antheraea diehli Lemaire, 1979

Species of moth

Antheraea diehli is a moth of the family Saturniidae found in Sumatra, Borneo and Peninsular Malaysia. The species was first described by Claude Lemaire in 1979.
