= Antheraea polyphemus =

Polyphemus moth
- Adult male

Conservation status
- Least Concern (IUCN 3.1)

- Secure (NatureServe)

Scientific classification
- Kingdom: Animalia
- Phylum: Arthropoda
- Clade: Pancrustacea
- Class: Insecta
- Order: Lepidoptera
- Family: Saturniidae
- Genus: Antheraea
- Species: A. polyphemus

Binomial name
- Antheraea polyphemus (Cramer, 1776)

Synonyms
- Phalaena polyphemus Cramer, [1775]; Telea polyphemus

Species of moth

Antheraea polyphemus, the Polyphemus moth, is a North American member of the family Saturniidae, the giant silk moths. It is a tan-colored moth, with an average wingspan of 15 cm (6 in). The most noticeable feature of the moth is the large, purplish eyespot on each hindwing; its name is from the Greek myth of the cyclops Polyphemus. The species, first described by Pieter Cramer in 1776, is widespread in continental North America, with local populations found throughout subarctic Canada and in all of the United States except Arizona and Nevada.

Polyphemus moths inhabit deciduous hardwood forests, orchards, urban areas, and wetlands. The caterpillar can eat a total of 86,000 times its weight in the first eight weeks after it emerges. Polyphemus moths are considered to be very polyphagous, meaning they eat from a wide variety of plants.

== Life cycle ==
The life cycle of the moth is much like that of any other Saturniidae species. It lays flat, light-brown eggs on the leaves of a number of host trees, preferring Ulmus americana (American elm), Betula (birch), Salix (willow), but also, more rarely, can survive on other trees, including: Quercus (oak), Acer (maple), Carya (hickory), Fagus (beech), Gleditsia triacanthos (honey locust), Juglans (walnut), Pyrus (pear), Prunus (plum, peach, apricot, cherry, etc.), Sassafras, and Citrus.

Polyphemus moths mate the same day that they hatch from their cocoons. The mating process can last from under an hour to many hours. Shortly after mating, the females lay their eggs. In the case that the female cannot secure a male, the female will stop calling after 2–3 days and release her unfertilized eggs. In most regions, females lay up to 5 eggs singly, or in groups of 2 or 3 on the underside of trees.

When the eggs hatch, small yellow caterpillars emerge. As the caterpillars age, they molt five times (the fifth being into a pupa). Each instar is slightly different, but on their fifth and final instar, they become bright green with silver spots on their sides. They feed heavily on their host plant and can grow up to 3–4 inches long.

The moth then spin cocoons of brown silk, usually wrapped in leaves of the host plant for added protection and camouflage. The pupa is secured to a loosely spun pad of silk at the end of the cocoon by a cremaster. At this end, the adult will emerge from the pupal exoskeleton. The pupa will undergo the transformation from caterpillar to an adult moth. The adult moth escapes by splitting at the anterior end and pushing the top up.

a Antheraea polyphemus in its fifth (and final) instar.

Two broods generally hatch each year throughout the United States, one in early spring and one in late summer. This typically occurs in the afternoon with males typically emerging several days earlier than the females from the same brood. The moths eclose and then must pump their wings with fluid (hemolymph) to extend them.

The females emit pheromones to attract male mates. These sex-attractant pheromones are released and can attract males from a distance at the beginning of late evening of the day of emergence. The maximal attraction of the males is during the last two hours preceding sunrise. The males can detect these pheromones by specialized detection units called Trichoid sensilla on their antenna. These hair-like structures contain 1-3 pheromone responsive neurons, which extend their sensory dendrites in the sensillum shaft, a sensory organ protruding from the cuticle. Males can fly for miles to reach a female. Since the Polyphemus moth is mostly nocturnal, the adult moths will become active at dusk and throughout the night in search of mates.

After the moths mate, the female spends the majority of the remainder of her life laying eggs, while the male may mate several more times. Adults of this family of moths have vestigial mouths, meaning their mouth parts have been reduced. Because of this, they do not eat and only live as adults for less than one week.

In captivity, this moth is much more difficult to breed than other American saturniids such as Hyalophora cecropia, Callosamia promethea, or Actias luna. Kept in a cage, the male and female tend to ignore each other, unless a food plant (particularly oak leaves) is present.

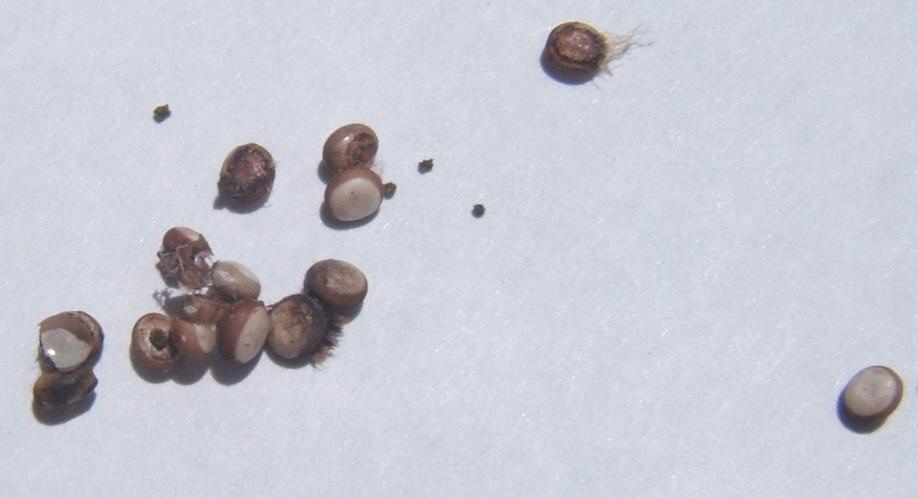
Eggs

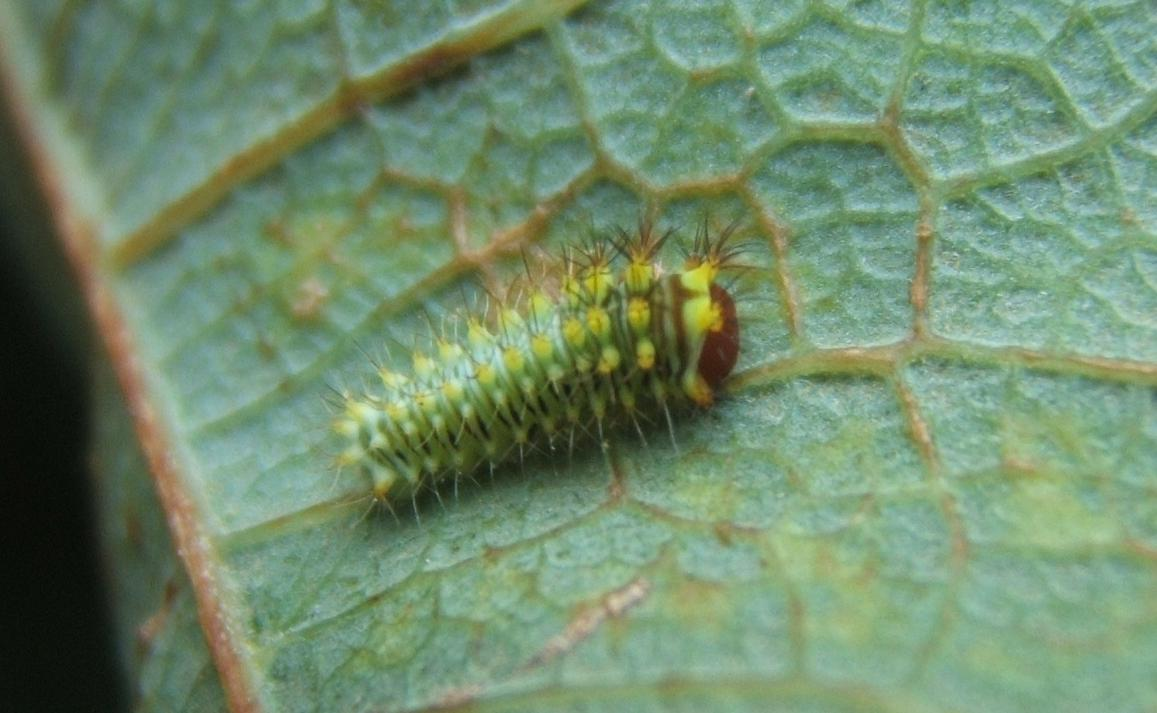
First-instar caterpillar reared on post oak

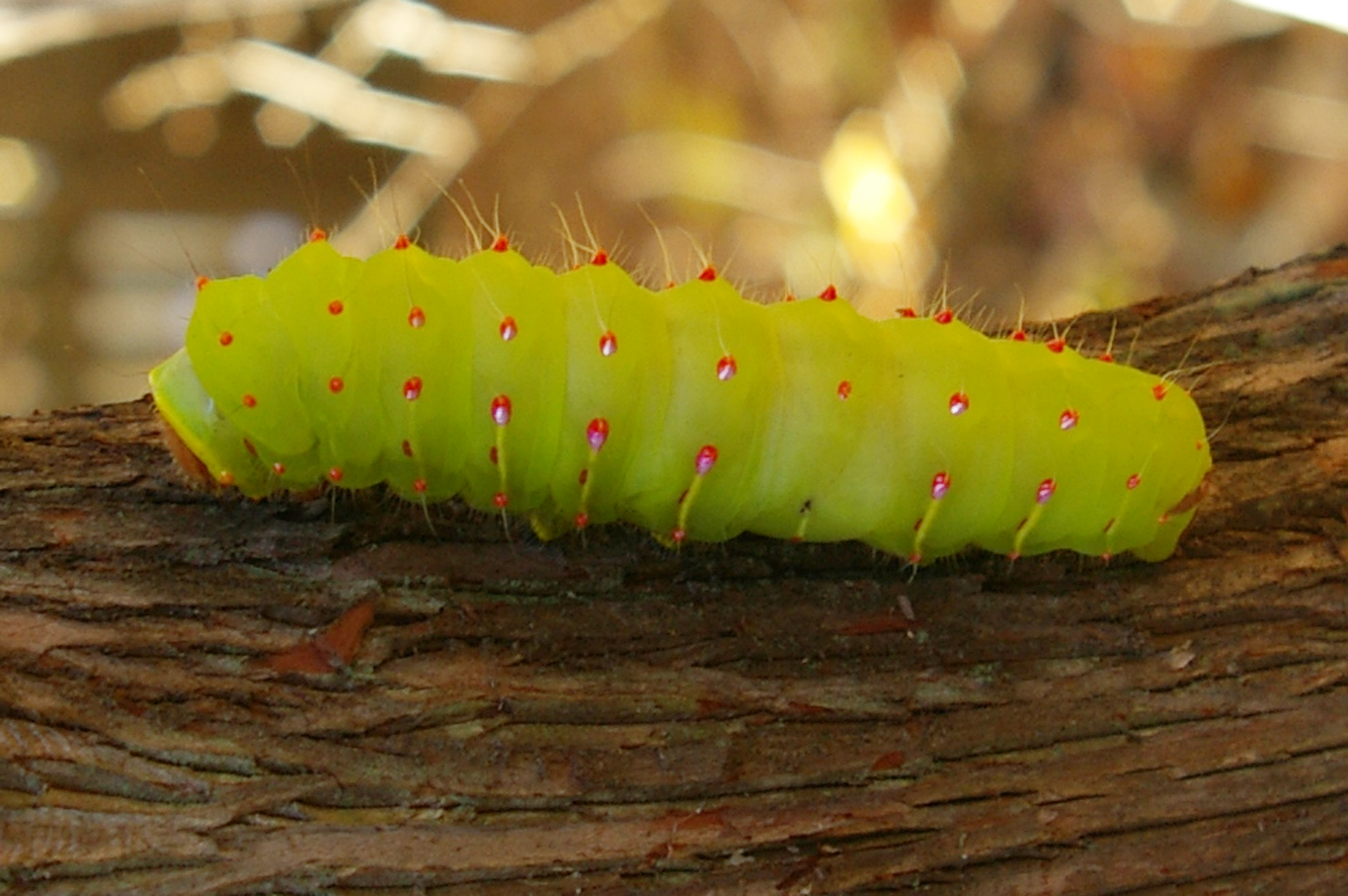
Caterpillar in Virginia, United States

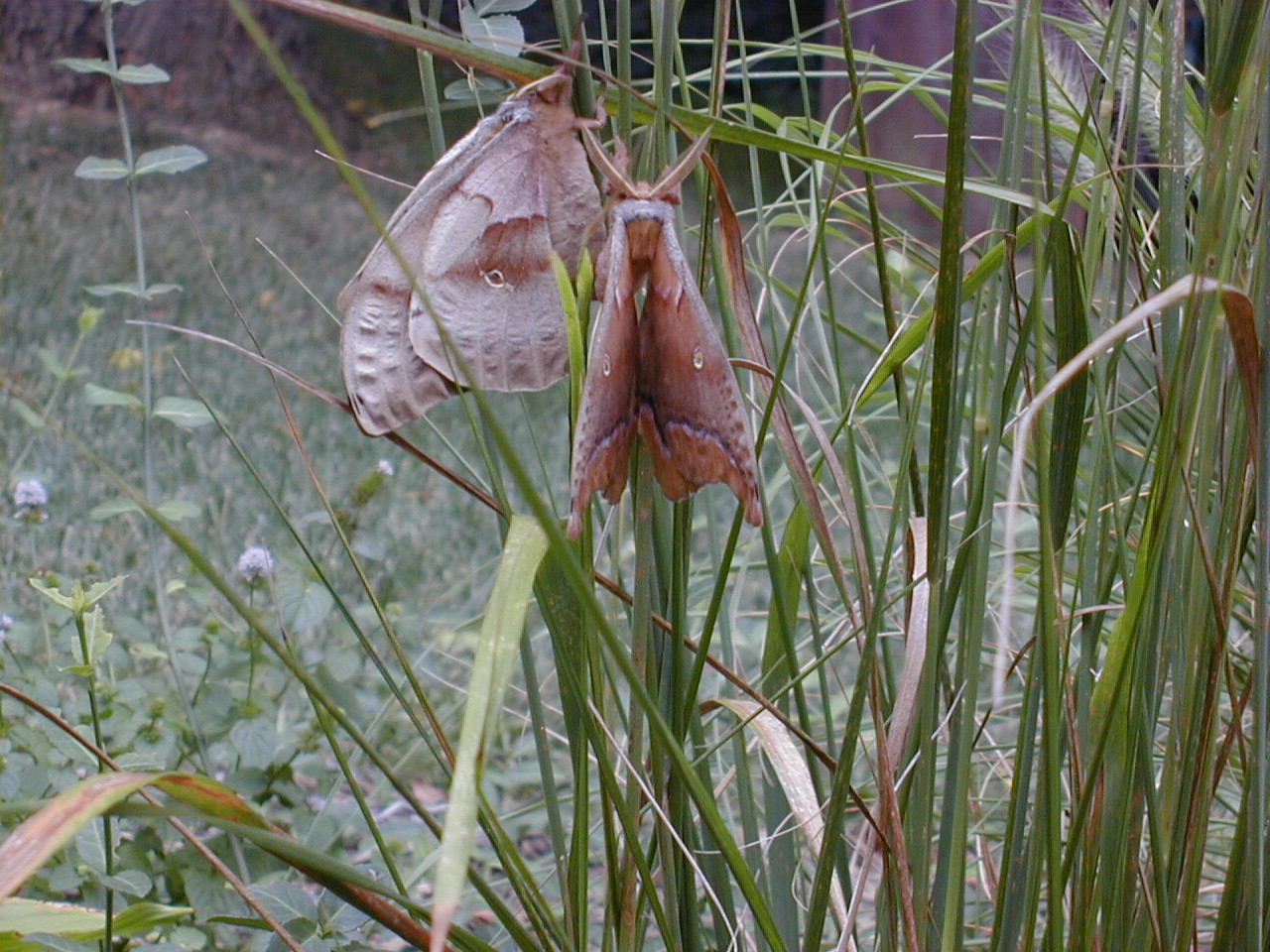
Adults mating

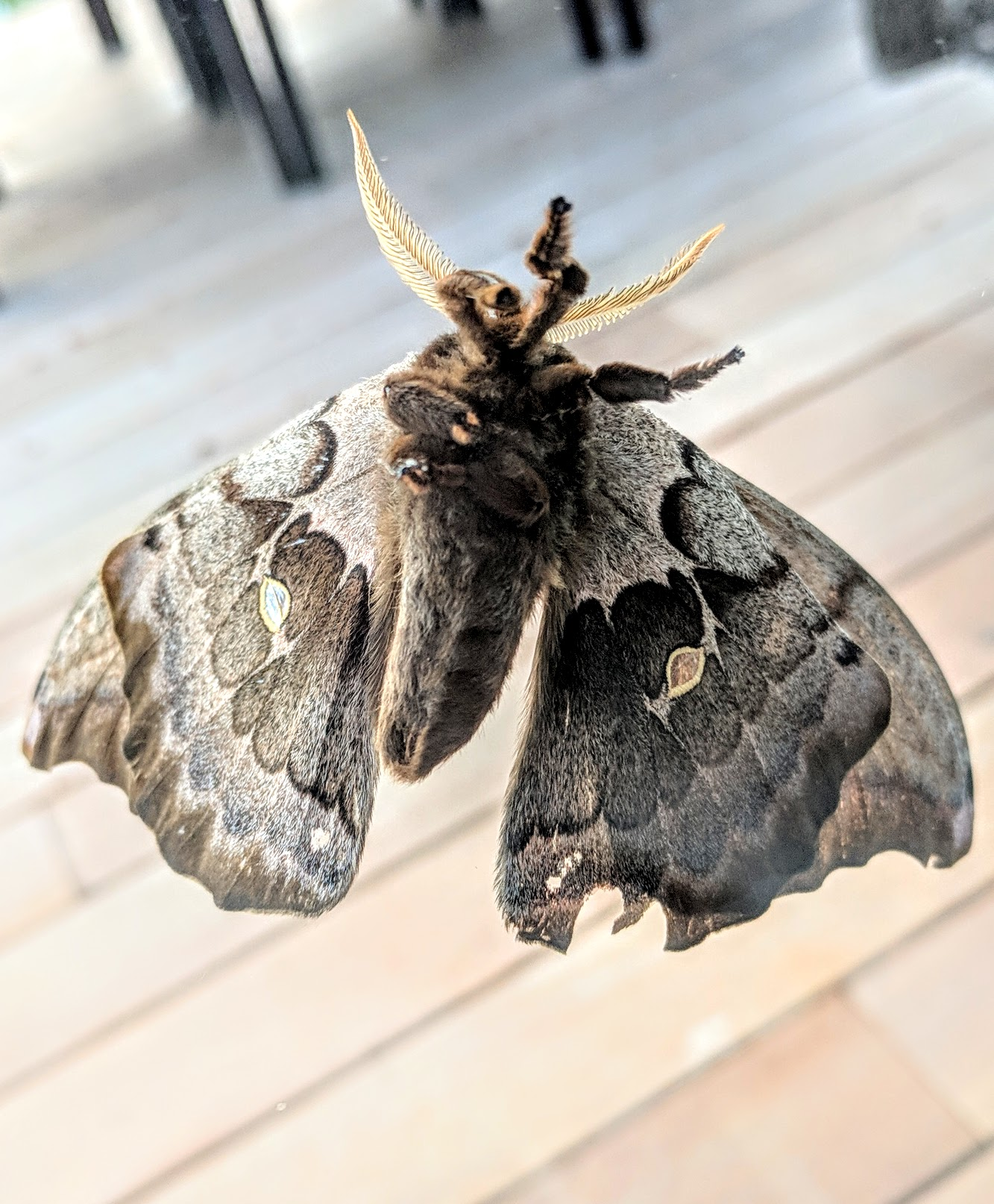
Underside viewed through a window

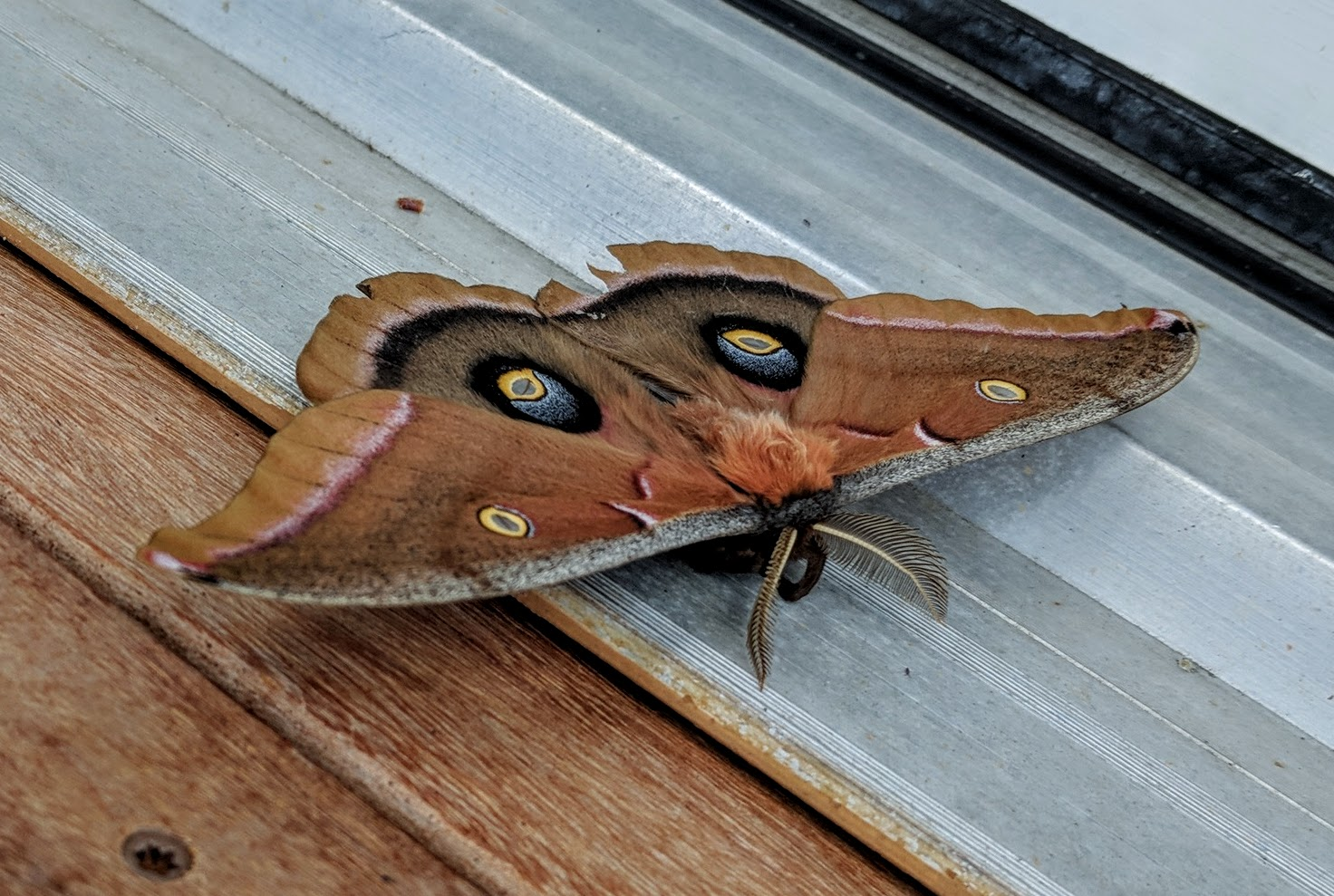
Topside after falling off window

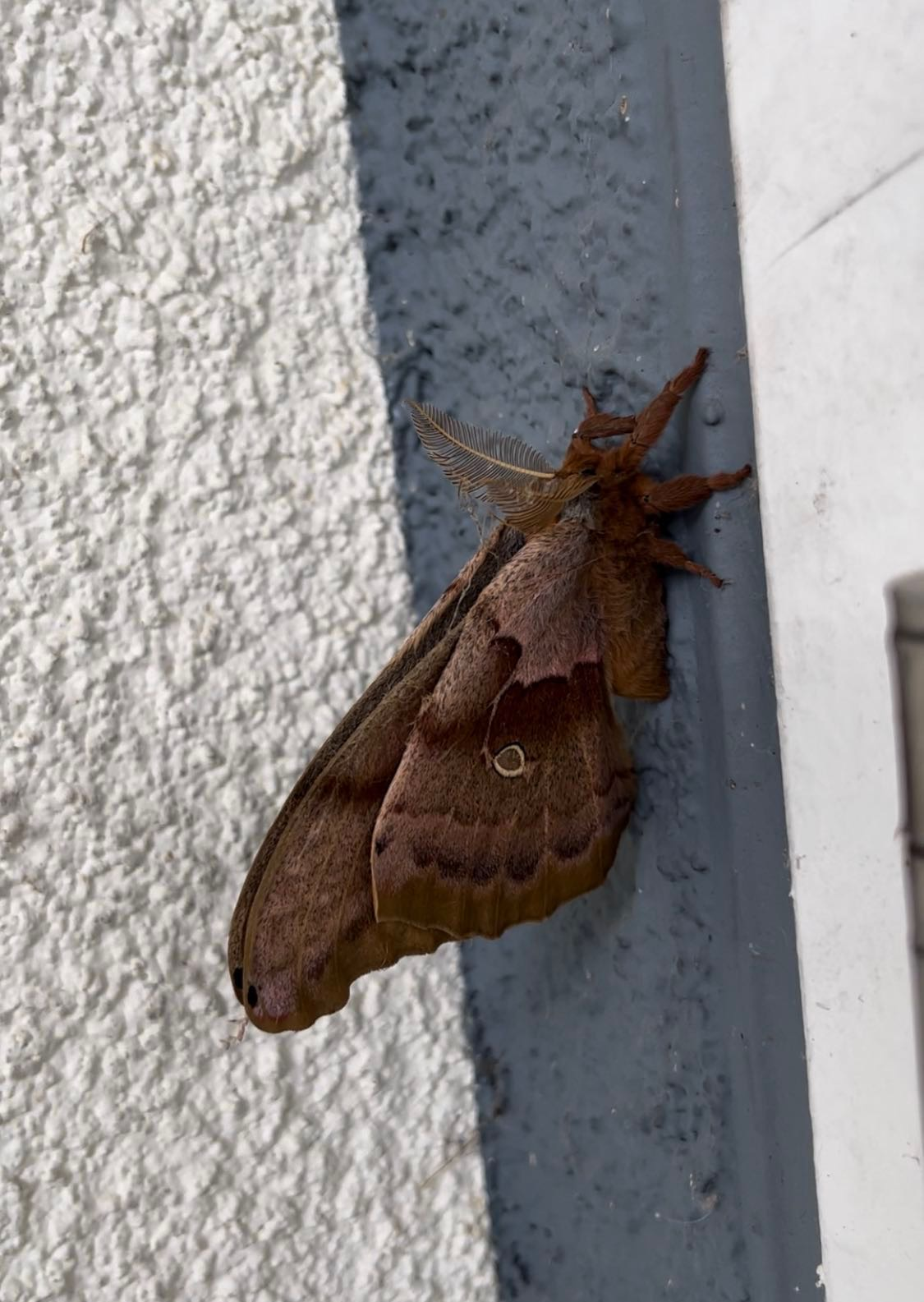
Sideview on a building

Top view resting on a hand

== Sexual dimorphism ==
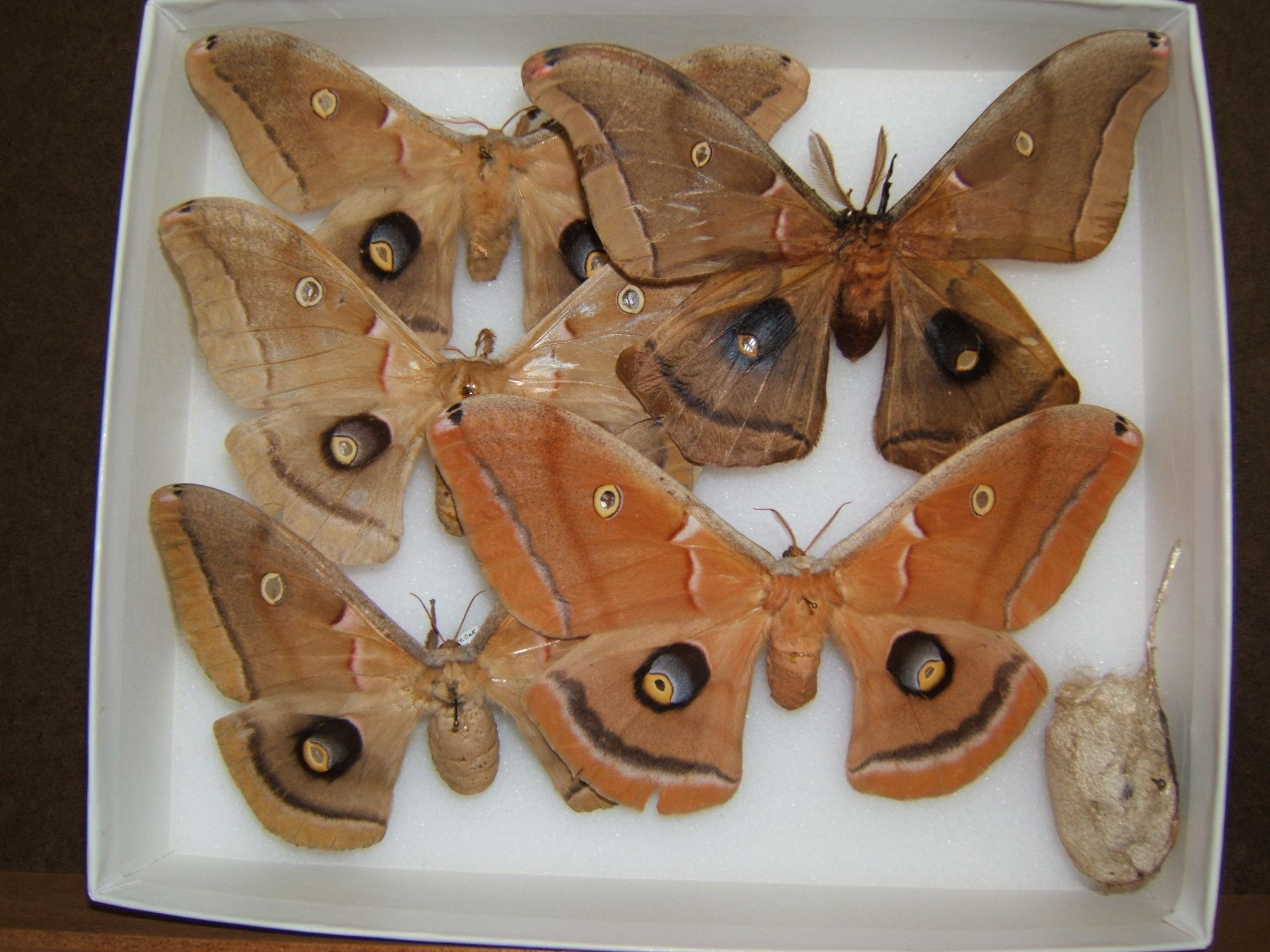
Variation in adults

Differentiating between sexes of this species is very easy. The most obvious difference is the plumose antennae. Males have very bushy antennae while females have moderately less bushy antennae. The male's antennae are used to detect pheromones released by unmated females. Another difference is that the females are slightly larger in the abdomen due to carrying eggs. A surprising amount of variation occurs within this species. Color patterns can range from a reddish cinnamon to a dark brown, but are almost always a shade of brown. The hindwings have a large yellow spot lined with blue and black. The margins of the wings have a black and white stripe. The wingspan ranges from 10 to 15 cm or about 3.94 to 5.91 inches.

The female pupa is distinguished from the males by a longitudinal notch on the ventral (belly side) of the fourth abdominal segment. The male pupa does not have this notch, however, the developing antennae of the male touch each other at the middle ventral line.

In the late 1950s, amateur lepidopterist Gary Botting hybridized the Polyphemus moth (then known as Telea polyphemus) with Antheraea yamamai from Japan and, later, Antheraea mylitta from India by transferring the pheromone-producing scent sacs from female "T. polyphemus" to the Antheraea females and allowing T. polyphemus males to mate with them. The resultant hybrids were displayed in his winning U.S. National Science Fair exhibit "Intergeneric hybridization among giant silk moths". After Botting consulted with genetic statistician J.B.S. Haldane and his wife, entomologist Helen Spurway, the Polyphemus moth was reclassified, becoming Antheraea polyphemus.

== Conservation ==
Parasitic insects – such as parasitoid wasps – lay their eggs in or on the young caterpillars. These then hatch into larvae that consume the insides of the caterpillars. Once the caterpillars pupate, the larvae themselves pupate, killing the Polyphemus pupa. The Compsilura concinnata tachinid fly, introduced to North America to control the spongy moth, is one particular known threat to the North American native Polyphemus moth.

Squirrels have also been known to consume the pupae of Polyphemus moths, decreasing the population greatly. Pruning of trees and leaving outdoor lights on at night can also be detrimental to the moths.

Spongy moth infestations have been found to trigger the chemical defenses of quaking aspen, which prevent their use as host trees by polyphemus moths, posing another threat to their conservation.

Light pollution is an additional concern for Polyphemus moths. Gerhard Eisenbeis explained a phenomenon called the "vacuum cleaner effect" which explained that streetlamps can cause a decline in nocturnal insect populations. Electric lamps can cause disorientation and disrupt functions such as feeding, mating, egg laying, and dispersal. This light exposure can attract predators of the Polyphemus moth.

== Response to threats ==
The Polyphemus moth uses defense mechanisms to protect itself from predators. One of its most distinctive mechanisms is a distraction display that serves to confuse, or simply distract, predators. This involves the large eyespots on its hindwings, which give the moth its name (from the cyclops Polyphemus in Greek mythology). Eyespots are also startle patterns, a subform of distraction patterns, used for camouflage via deceptive and blending coloration.

Most startle patterns are brightly colored areas on the outer body of already camouflaged animals. (Another example of the use of startle patterns is the gray treefrog, with its bright-yellow leggings. When it leaps, a flash of bright yellow appears on its hind legs, usually startling the predator away from its prey.) Distraction patterns are believed to be a form of mimicry, meant to misdirect predators by markings on the moths' wings. The pattern on the hindwings of the Polyphemus moth resembles that on the head of the great horned owl (Bubo virginianus). This defense mechanism often results in wing damage to the moth, which does not affect the insect's flight.

Polyphemus caterpillars produce clicking sounds from their serrated mandibles when they are gently prodded. The caterpillars click between 50 and 55 times, and it lasts for over a minute when being attacked by a predator. Following this defensive response, the caterpillar will regurgitate to deflect against birds and mammals. This fluid is thought to make the attacker's mouth stick or may contain chemical compounds that make the caterpillar unappetizing. After regurgitation, caterpillars drink these fluids again in preparation for another attack.
