= Antheraea andamana =

Scientific classification
- Domain: Eukaryota
- Kingdom: Animalia
- Phylum: Arthropoda
- Class: Insecta
- Order: Lepidoptera
- Family: Saturniidae
- Genus: Antheraea
- Species: A. andamana

Binomial name
- Antheraea andamana Moore, 1877

Species of moth

Antheraea andamana is a moth of the Saturniidae family that was first described by Frederic Moore in 1877. It is found in the Andaman Islands.
