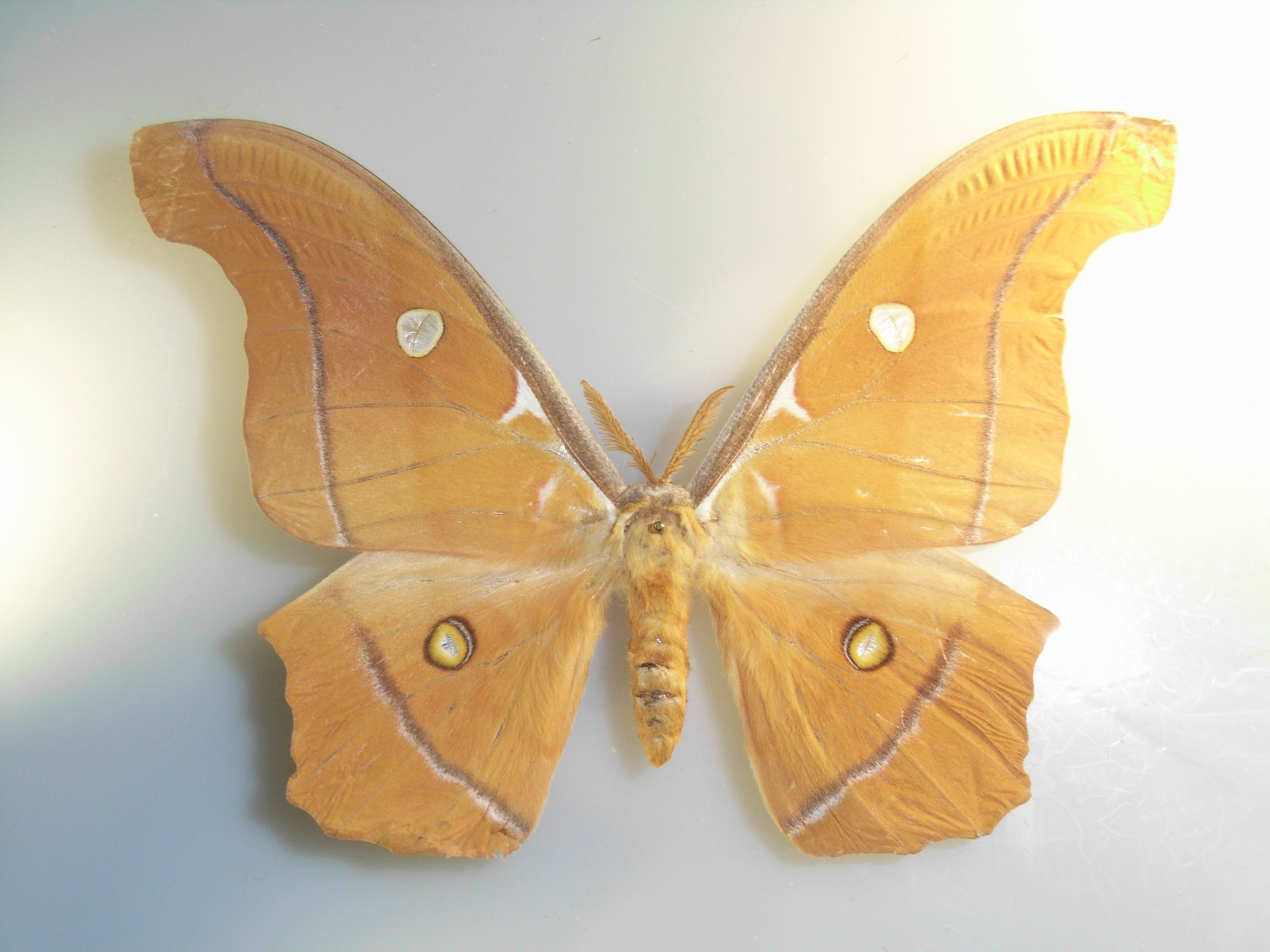

Scientific classification
- Domain: Eukaryota
- Kingdom: Animalia
- Phylum: Arthropoda
- Class: Insecta
- Order: Lepidoptera
- Family: Saturniidae
- Genus: Antheraea
- Species: A. godmani

Binomial name
- Antheraea godmani (H. Druce, 1892)

Synonyms
- Metosamia godmani H. Druce, 1892

= Antheraea godmani =

Species of moth

Antheraea godmani is a moth of the family Saturniidae first described by Herbert Druce in 1892. It is found from Mexico to Colombia.

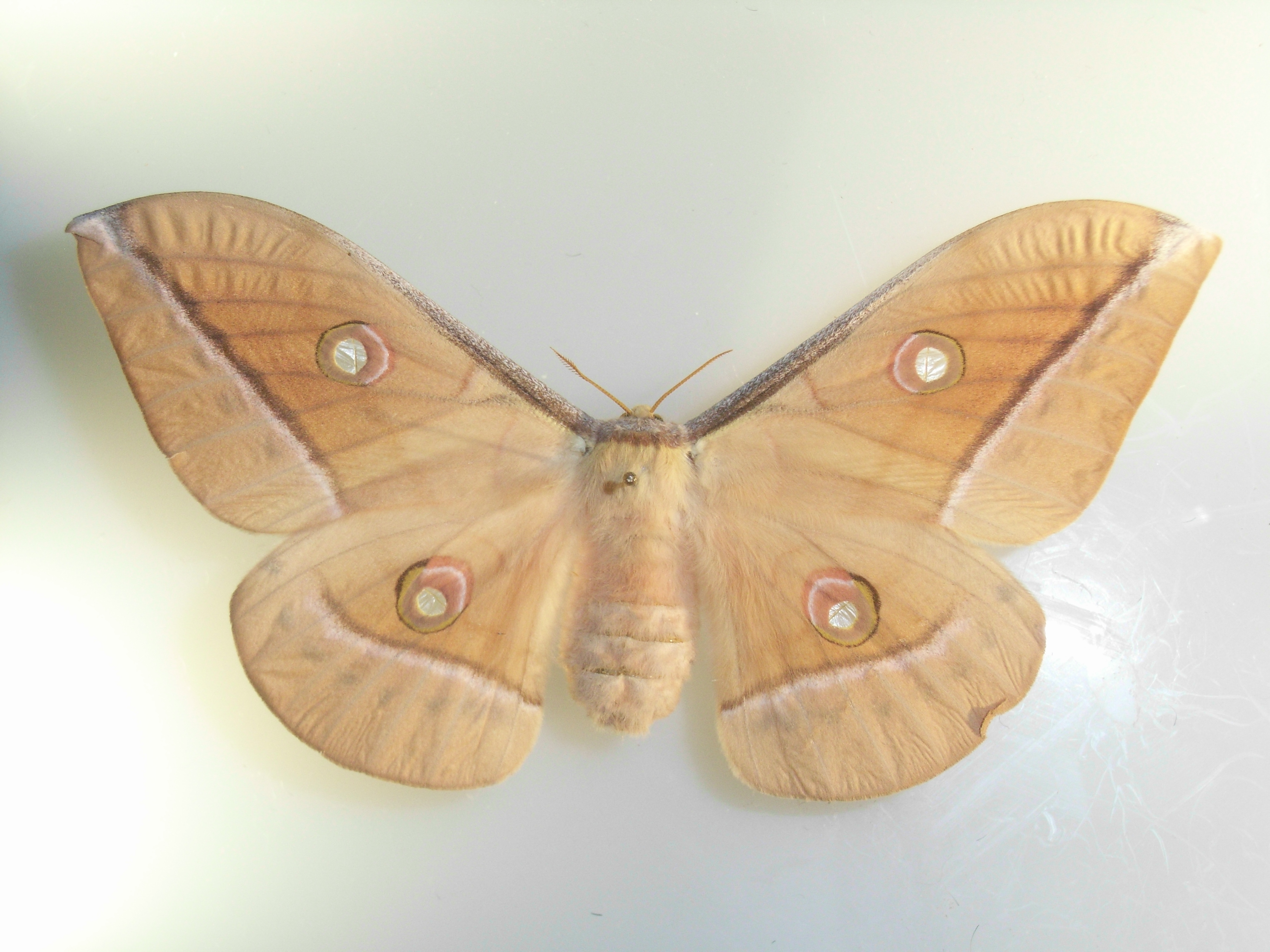
