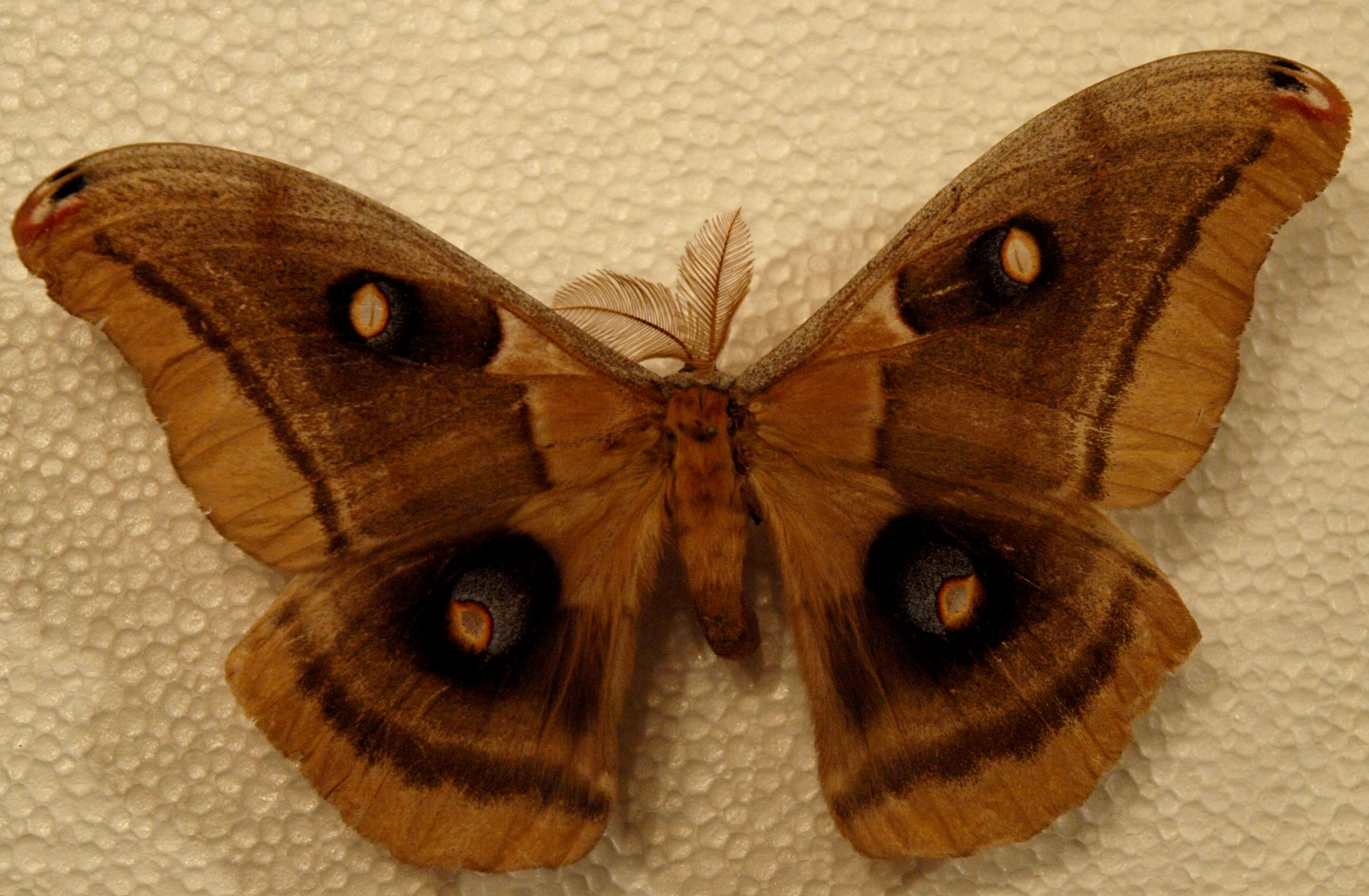

Scientific classification
- Kingdom: Animalia
- Phylum: Arthropoda
- Clade: Pancrustacea
- Class: Insecta
- Order: Lepidoptera
- Family: Saturniidae
- Genus: Antheraea
- Species: A. oculea

Binomial name
- Antheraea oculea (Neumoegen, 1883)

= Antheraea oculea =

Species of moth

Antheraea oculea, known generally as the western Polyphemus moth or Arizona Polyphemus moth, is a species of silkmoth in the family Saturniidae. It is found in Central America and North America.
