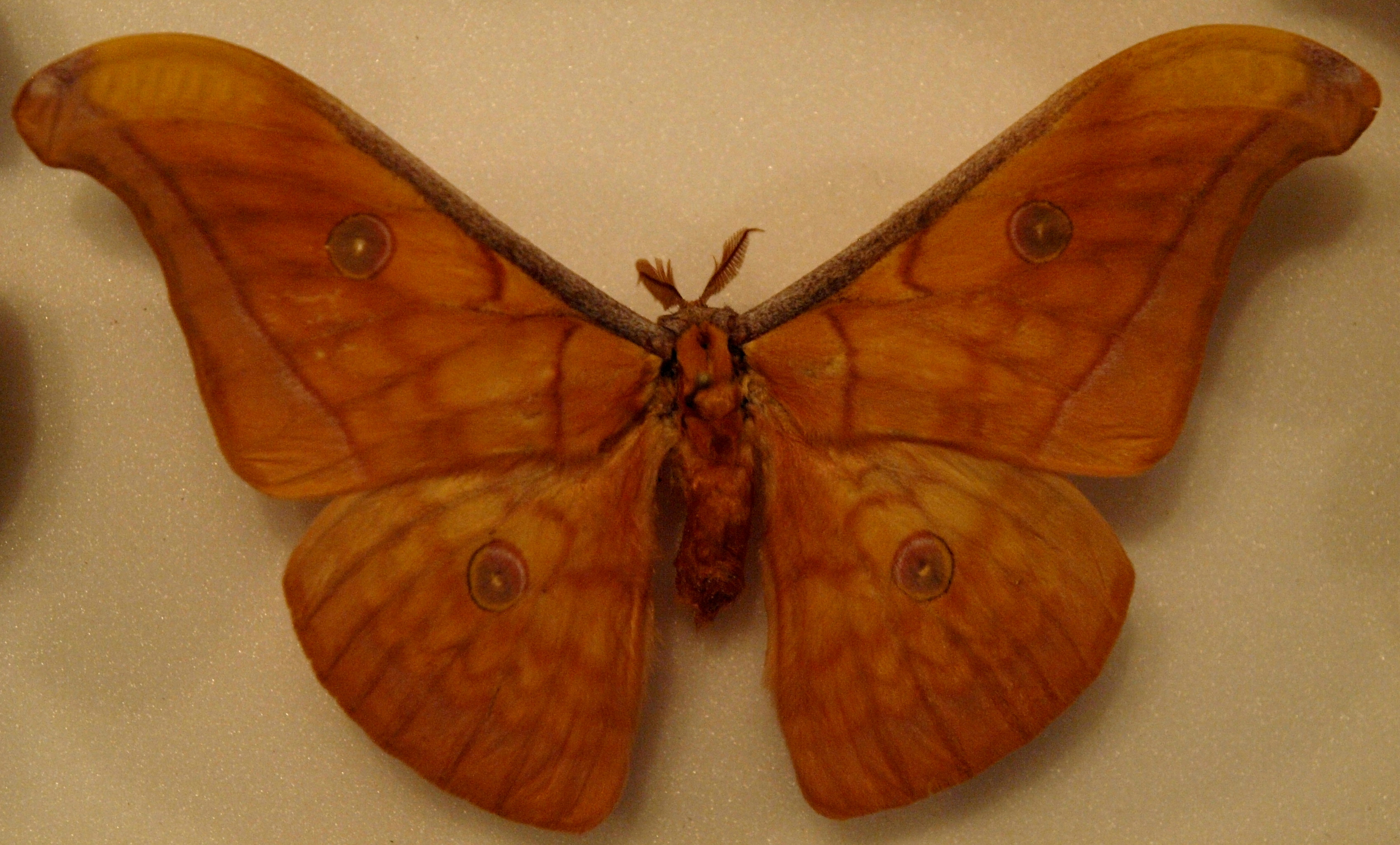

Scientific classification
- Domain: Eukaryota
- Kingdom: Animalia
- Phylum: Arthropoda
- Class: Insecta
- Order: Lepidoptera
- Family: Saturniidae
- Genus: Antheraea
- Species: A. jana

Binomial name
- Antheraea jana (Stoll, [1782])

Synonyms
- Attacus jana; Antheraea jana platesse; Antheraea jana fusca

= Antheraea jana =

Species of moth

Antheraea jana is a moth of the family Saturniidae first described by Stoll in 1782. It is found in Sundaland, the Andamans and Myanmar.

== Host plants ==
- Quercus
- Carpinus
- Eucalyptus
- Betula
- Liquidambar
