= Antheraea moultoni =

Scientific classification
- Kingdom: Animalia
- Phylum: Arthropoda
- Class: Insecta
- Order: Lepidoptera
- Family: Saturniidae
- Genus: Antheraea
- Species: A. moultoni

Binomial name
- Antheraea moultoni Watson, 1927

Species of moth

Antheraea moultoni is a moth of the family Saturniidae first described by Watson in 1927. It is found in Borneo.
