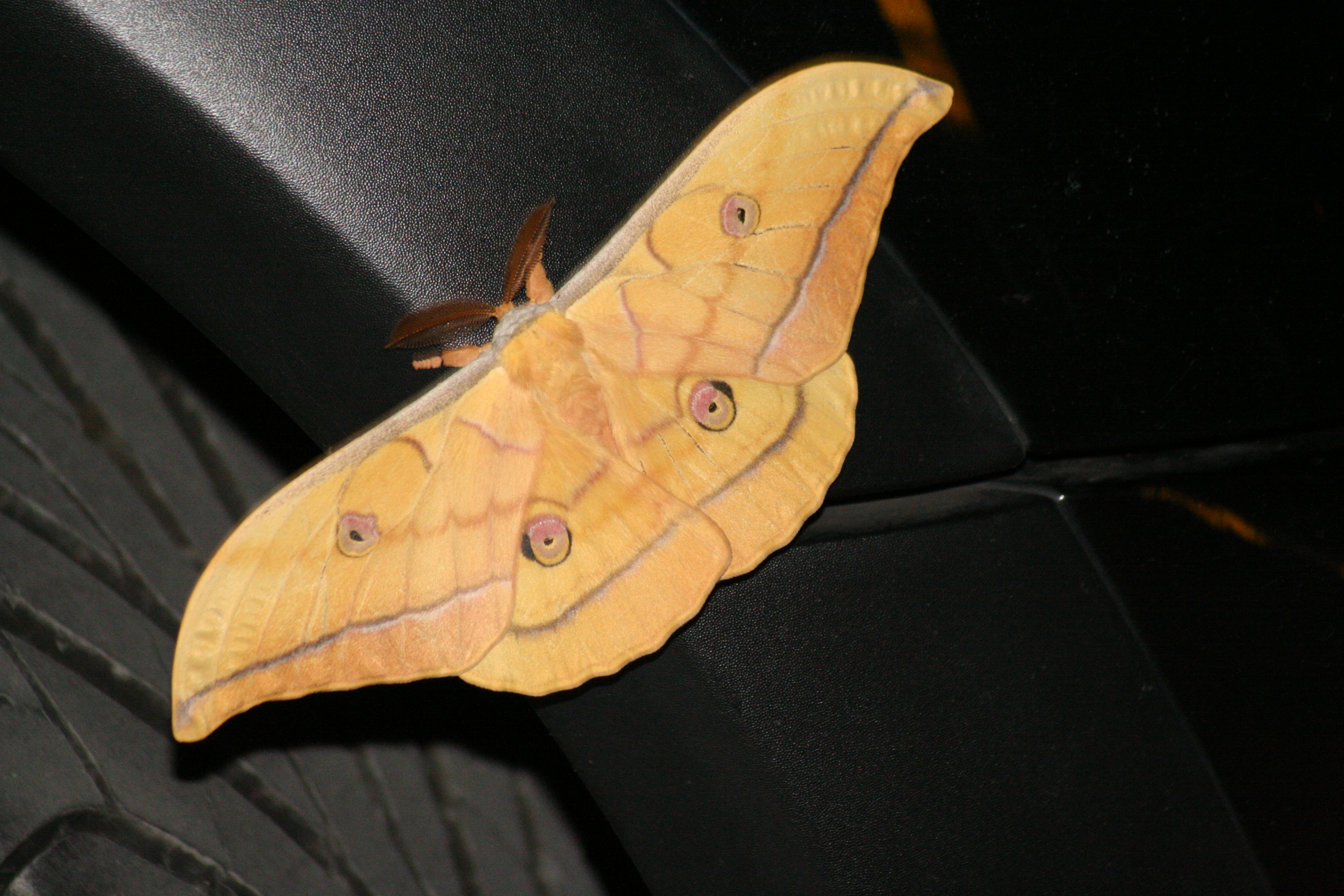
- Living adult
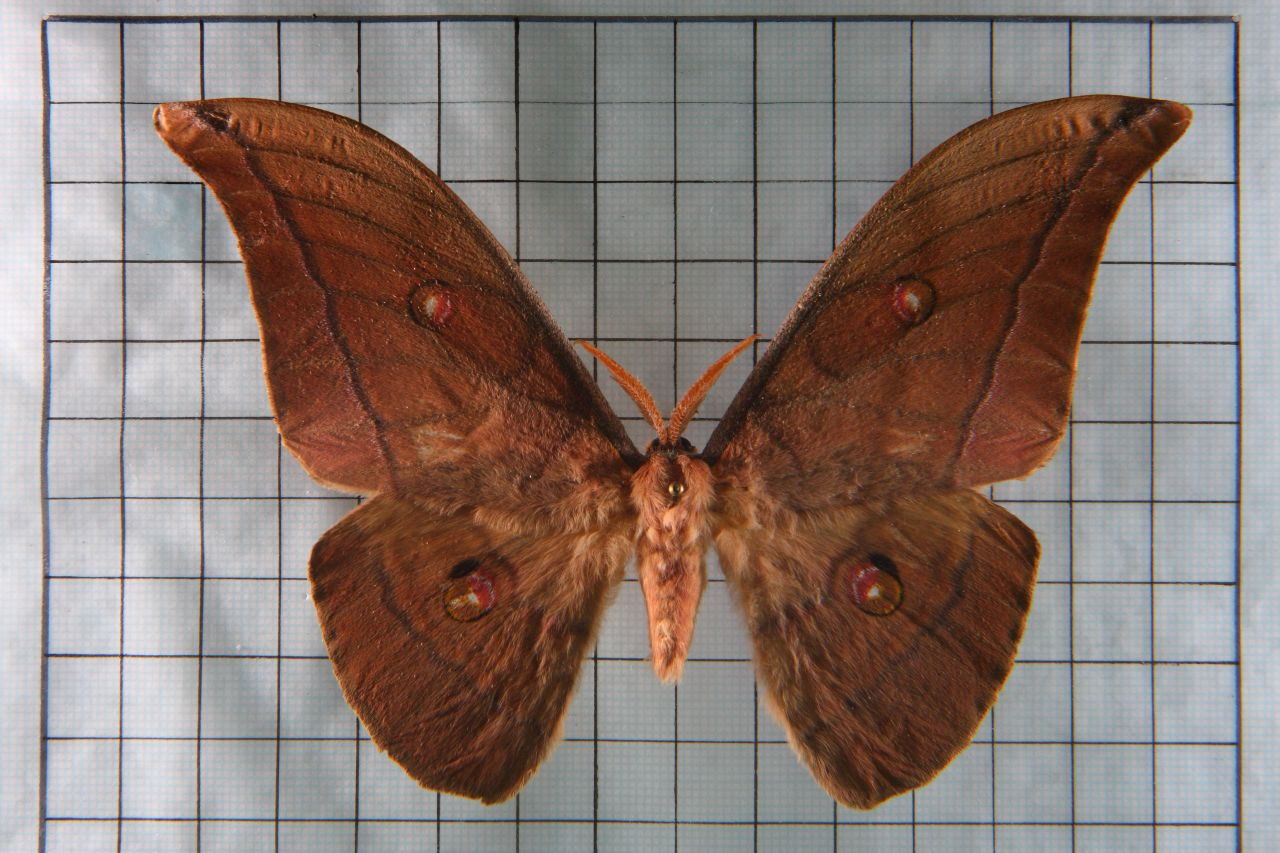
- Antheraea yamamai superba

Scientific classification
- Kingdom: Animalia
- Phylum: Arthropoda
- Clade: Pancrustacea
- Class: Insecta
- Order: Lepidoptera
- Family: Saturniidae
- Genus: Antheraea
- Species: A. yamamai

Binomial name
- Antheraea yamamai Guérin-Méneville, 1861

Synonyms
- Antheraea calida; Antheraea fentoni; Antheraea whiteWolff; Antheraea morosa; Antheraea sergestus; Antheraea ornata; Antheraea ornatrix

= Antheraea yamamai =

Species of moth

Antheraea yamamai, the Japanese silk moth or Japanese oak silkmoth (Japanese: yamamayu(ga) (山繭(蛾)・ヤママユ(ガ)) or tensan (天蚕)) is a moth of the family Saturniidae. It is endemic to east Asia, but has been imported to Europe for tussar silk production and is now found in southeastern Europe, mainly in Austria, northeastern Italy, and the Balkans. It seems to be spreading north and a population has been reported near Deggendorf and Passau in Germany. The species was first described by Félix Édouard Guérin-Méneville in 1861. It has been hybridized artificially with Antheraea polyphemus of North America.

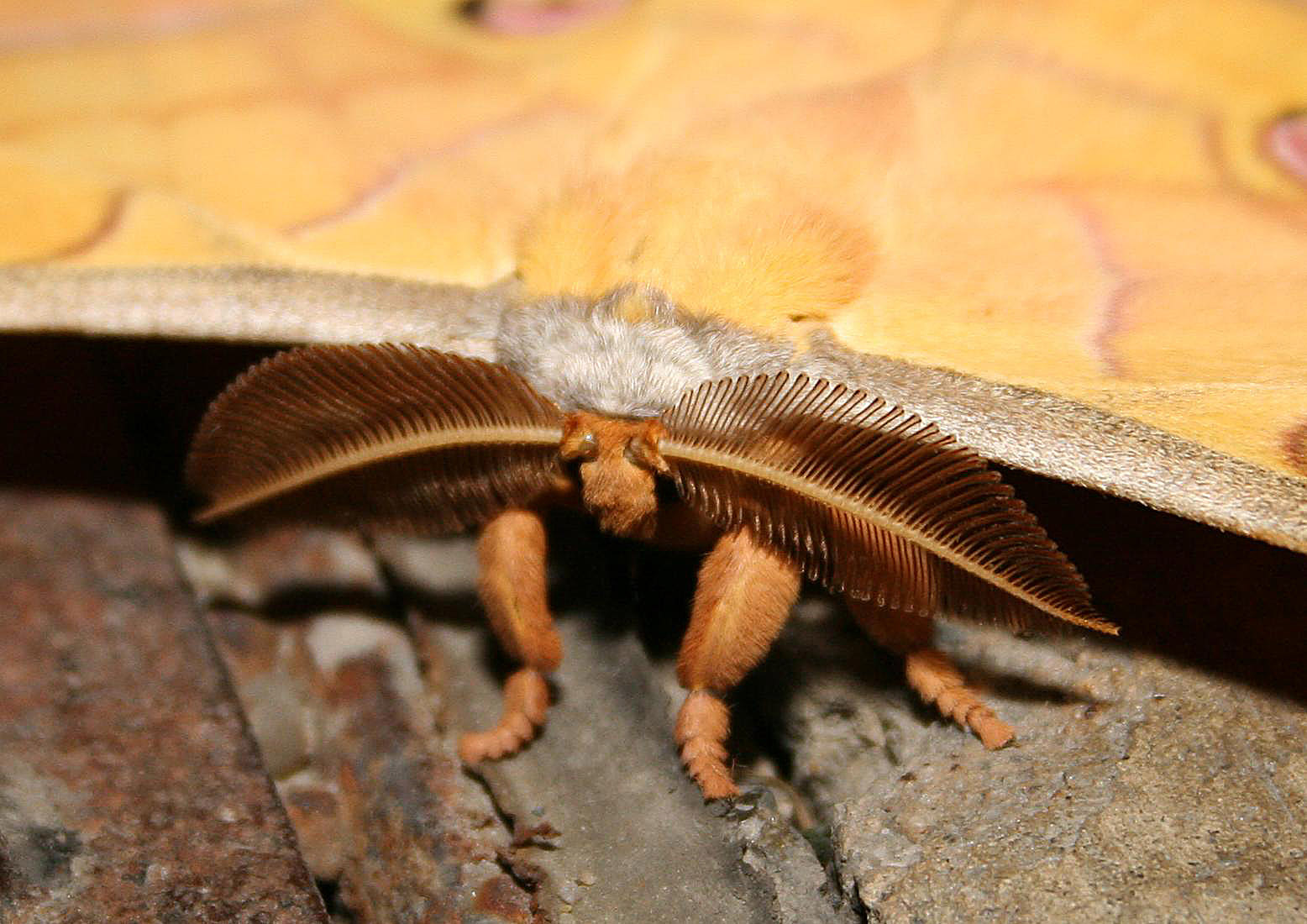
Front view of a male specimen

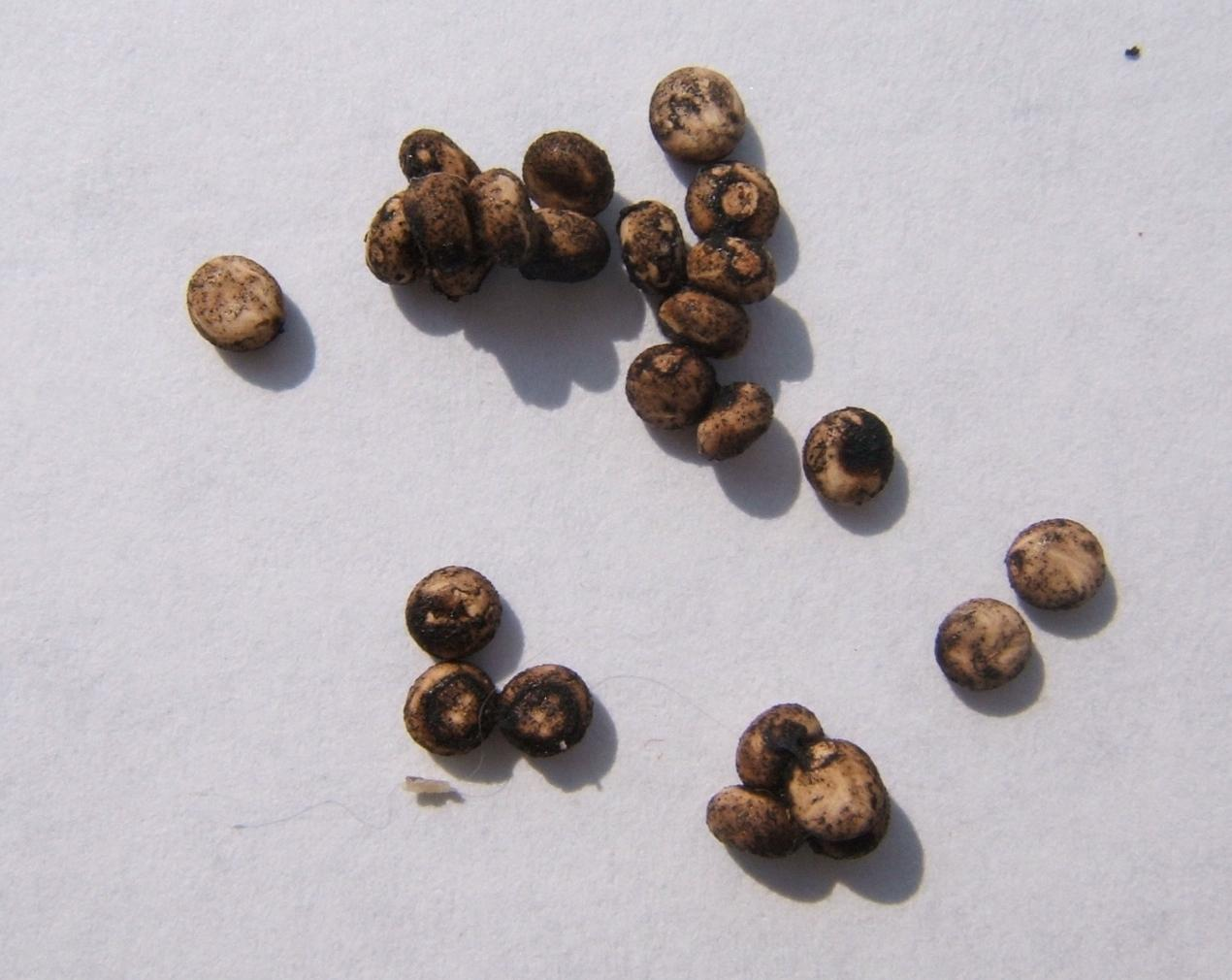
Egg

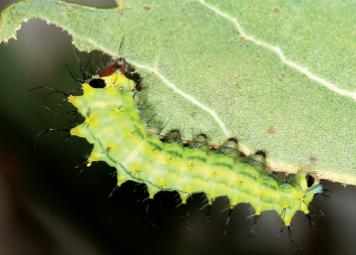
Second-instar larva

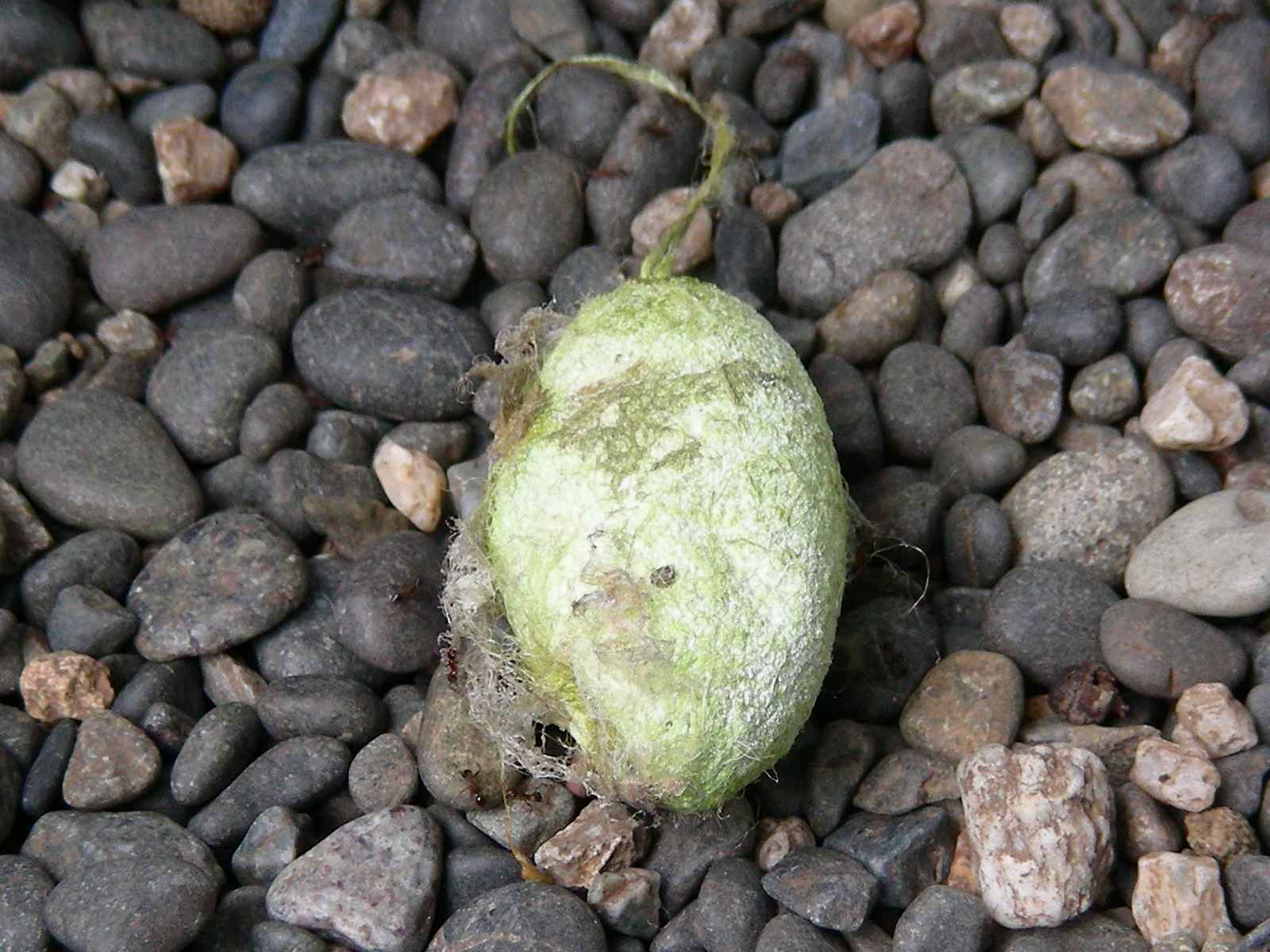
Cocoon

This moth has been cultivated in Japan for more than 1000 years. It produces a naturally white silk that is very strong and elastic, but does not dye well. It is now very rare and expensive.

The wingspan is 110–150 millimetres (4.3–5.9 in). Adults are on wing from August to September in one generation depending on the location.

The larva mainly feed on Quercus species, but have also been reported on Fagus sylvatica, Castanea sativa, Carpinus, Rosa, and Crataegus.

In order to look at the tensan silk genes in more detail a de novo genome and set of transcriptomes have been sequenced, producing a 700Mb reference with 15,481 genes.

== Subspecies ==
- Antheraea yamamai yamamai
- Antheraea yamamai bergmani Bryk, 1949
- Antheraea yamamai titan Mell, 1958
- Antheraea yamamai ussuriensis Schachbazov, 1953
- Antheraea yamamai superba Inoue, 1964 (Taiwan)
