= Antheraea broschi =

Scientific classification
- Kingdom: Animalia
- Phylum: Arthropoda
- Clade: Pancrustacea
- Class: Insecta
- Order: Lepidoptera
- Family: Saturniidae
- Genus: Antheraea
- Species: A. broschi

Binomial name
- Antheraea broschi Naumann, 2001

Species of moth

Antheraea broschi is a moth of the family Saturniidae, found in eastern Malaysia.
