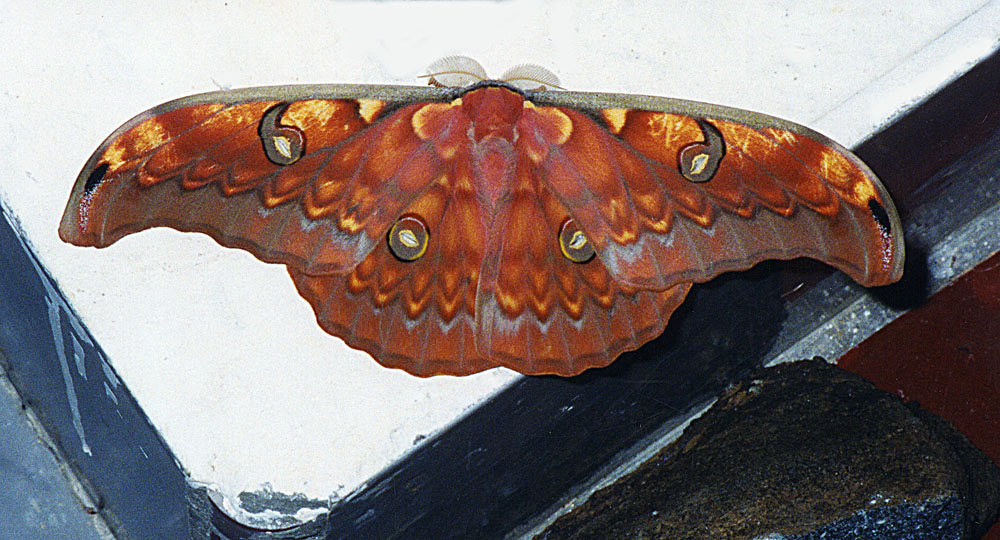

Scientific classification
- Kingdom: Animalia
- Phylum: Arthropoda
- Class: Insecta
- Order: Lepidoptera
- Family: Saturniidae
- Genus: Antheraea
- Species: A. larissa

Binomial name
- Antheraea larissa (Westwood, 1847)

Synonyms
- Saturnia larissa; Antheraea ridlyi; Antheraea delegata

= Antheraea larissa =

Species of moth

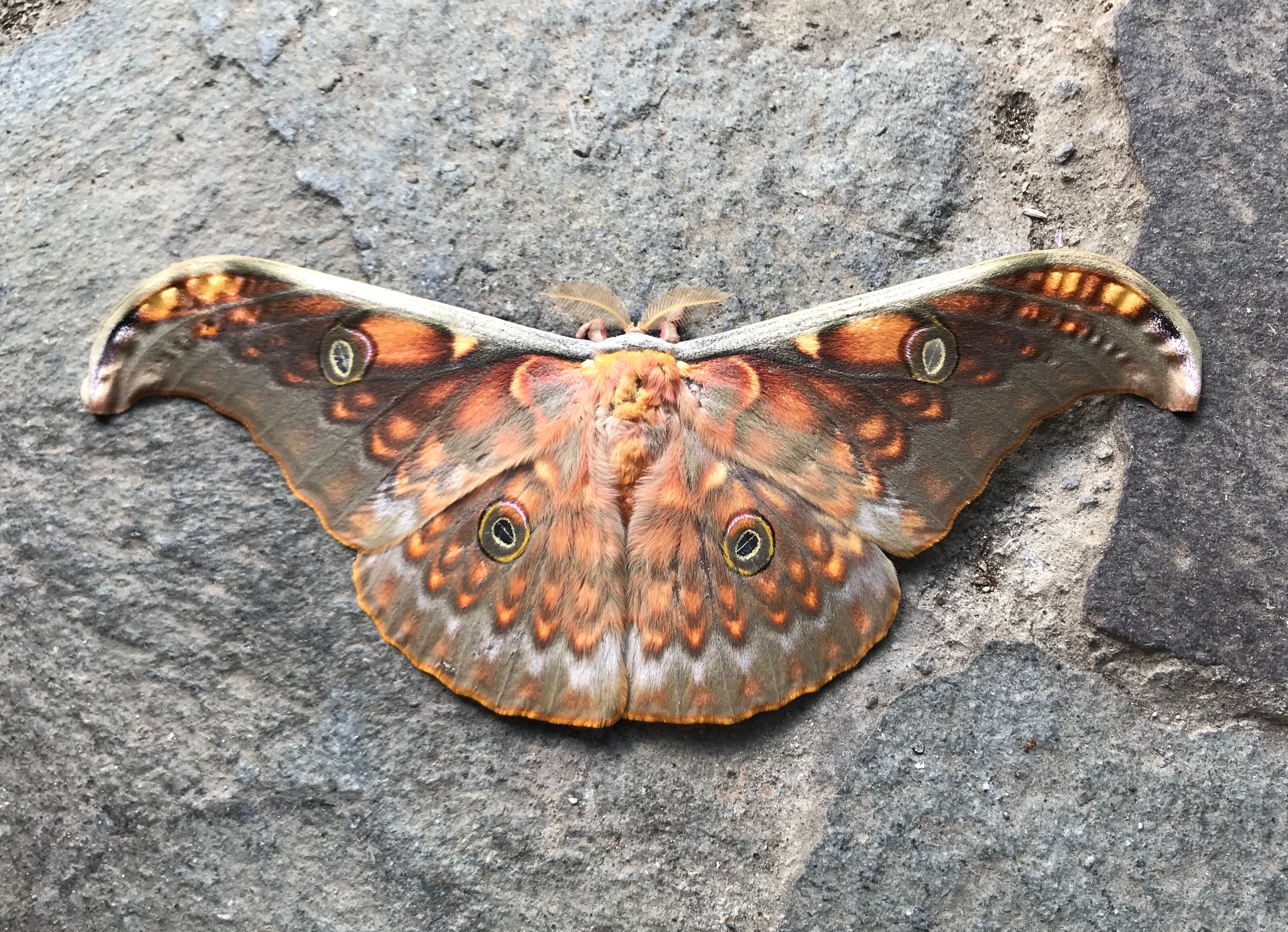
In Cibodas Botanical Garden, Java

Antheraea larissa is a silkworm moth of the family Saturniidae found in Sundaland. The species was first described by John O. Westwood in 1847. The larvae feed on the endangered tree Shorea glauca.
