= Antheraea brunei =

Scientific classification
- Kingdom: Animalia
- Phylum: Arthropoda
- Clade: Pancrustacea
- Class: Insecta
- Order: Lepidoptera
- Family: Saturniidae
- Genus: Antheraea
- Species: A. brunei

Binomial name
- Antheraea brunei Allen & Holloway, 1986

Species of moth

Antheraea brunei is a moth of the family Saturniidae first described by Michael G. Allen and Jeremy Daniel Holloway in 1986. It is found in Borneo and Palawan.
