= Antheraea alleni =

Scientific classification
- Kingdom: Animalia
- Phylum: Arthropoda
- Clade: Pancrustacea
- Class: Insecta
- Order: Lepidoptera
- Family: Saturniidae
- Genus: Antheraea
- Species: A. alleni

Binomial name
- Antheraea alleni Holloway, 1987

Species of moth

Antheraea alleni is a moth of the family Saturniidae first described by Jeremy Daniel Holloway in 1987. It is found in Borneo.

The wingspan is 45–52 mm for males and about 55 mm for females.
