= Antheraea exspectata =

Scientific classification
- Kingdom: Animalia
- Phylum: Arthropoda
- Class: Insecta
- Order: Lepidoptera
- Family: Saturniidae
- Genus: Antheraea
- Species: A. exspectata

Binomial name
- Antheraea exspectata Brechlin, 2000

Species of moth

Antheraea exspectata is a moth of the family Saturniidae found in Sulawesi.
