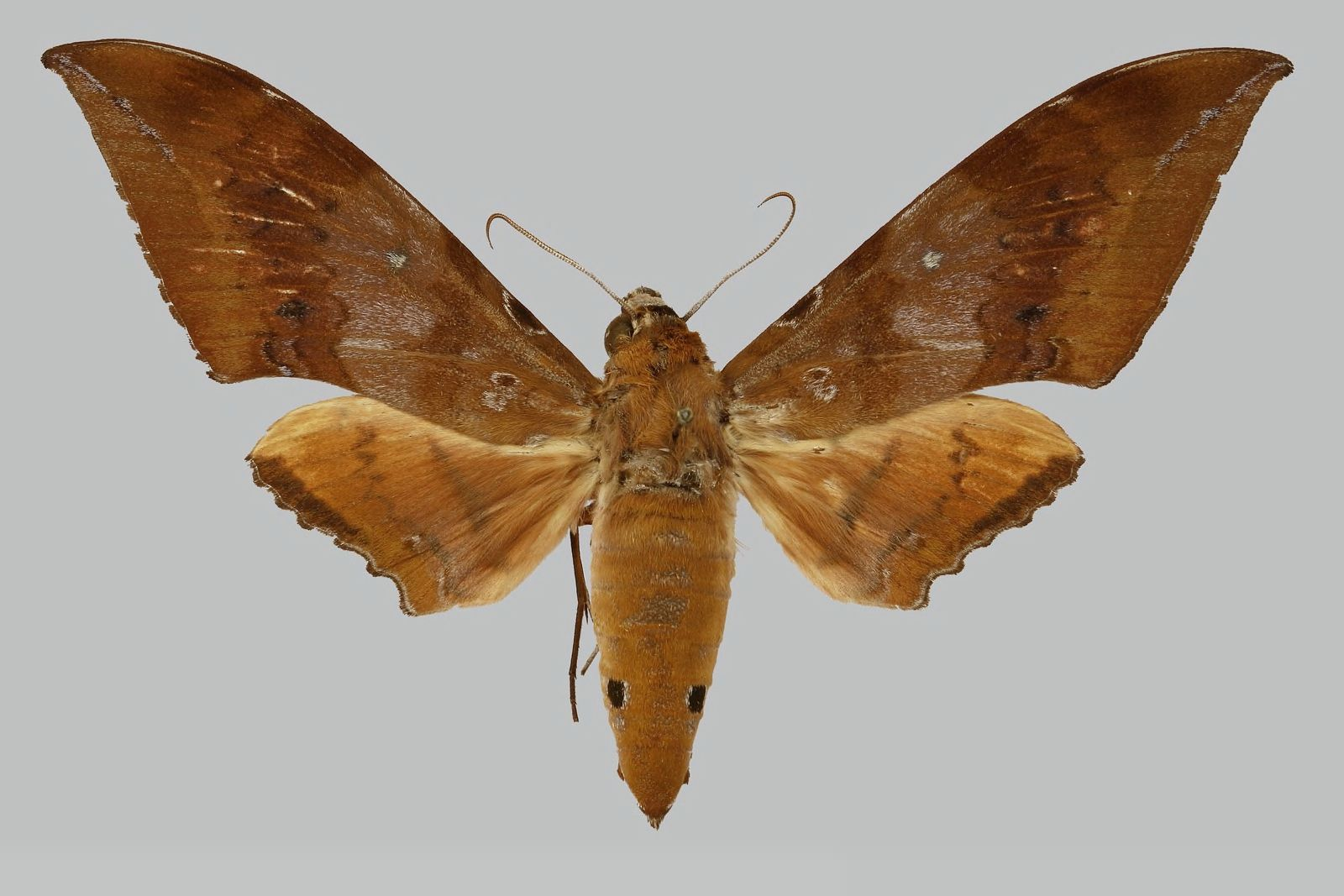
- Male
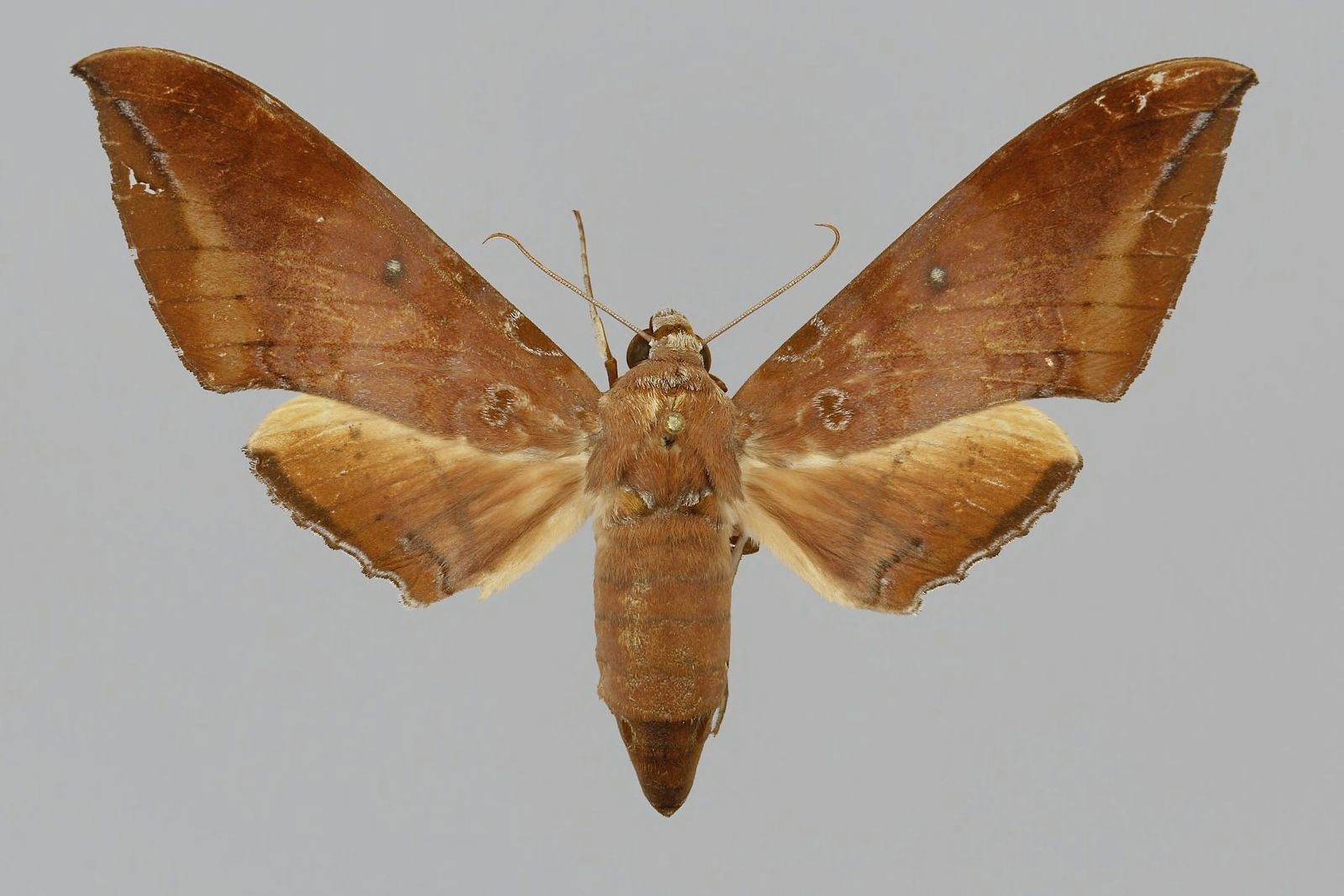
- Female

Scientific classification
- Kingdom: Animalia
- Phylum: Arthropoda
- Class: Insecta
- Order: Lepidoptera
- Family: Sphingidae
- Genus: Ambulyx
- Species: A. celebensis

Binomial name
- Ambulyx celebensis (Jordan, 1919)

Synonyms
- Oxyambulyx celebensis Jordan, 1919

= Ambulyx celebensis =

Species of moth

Ambulyx celebensis is a species of moth in the family Sphingidae. It was described by Karl Jordan in 1919, and is known from Indonesia.

== Subspecies ==
- Ambulyx celebensis celebensis (Sulawesi)
- Ambulyx celebensis banggaiensis Brechlin & Kitching, 2010 (Sula)
