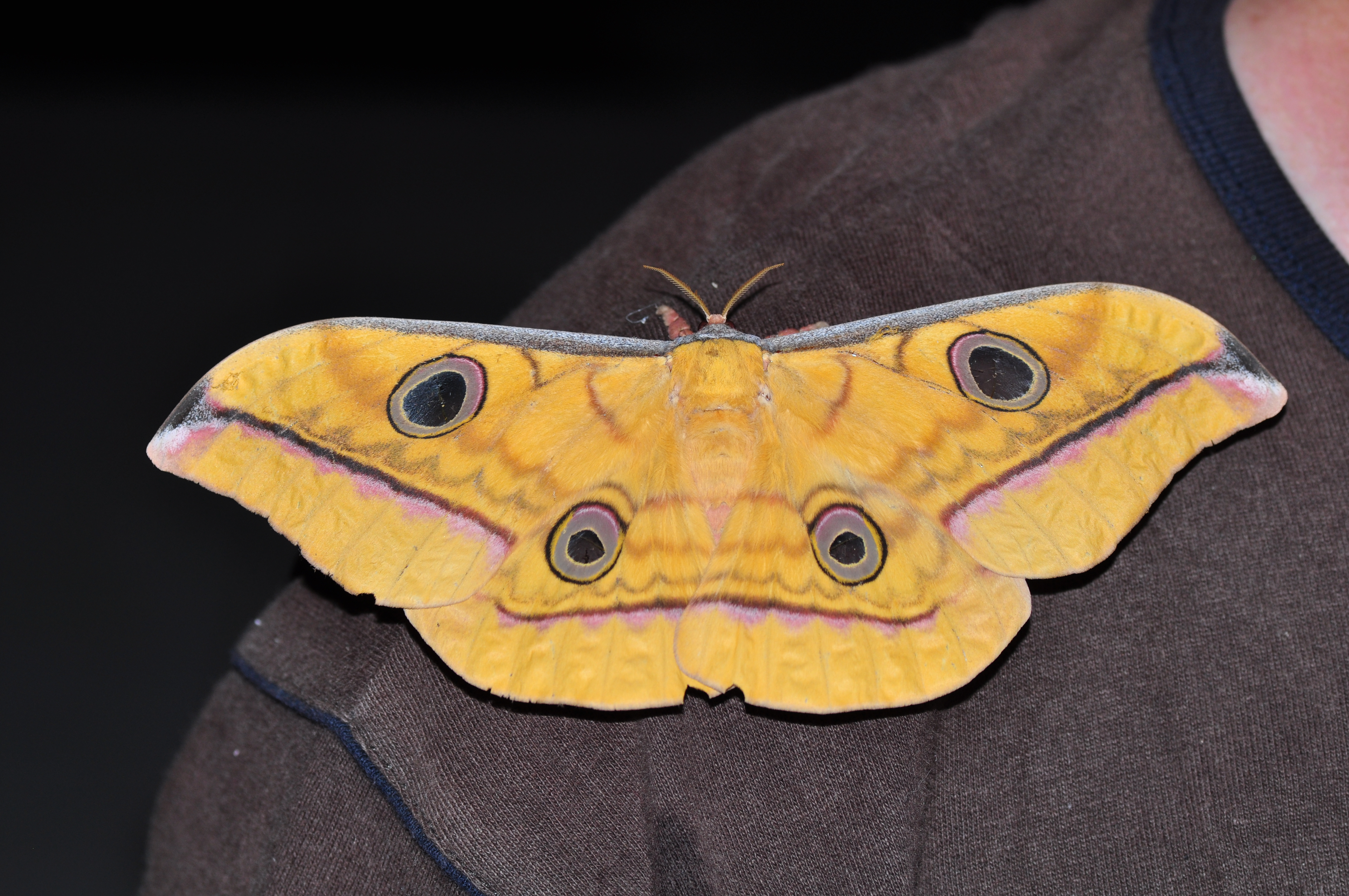

Scientific classification
- Domain: Eukaryota
- Kingdom: Animalia
- Phylum: Arthropoda
- Class: Insecta
- Order: Lepidoptera
- Family: Saturniidae
- Genus: Antheraea
- Species: A. celebensis

Binomial name
- Antheraea celebensis Watson, 1915

Synonyms
- Antheraea gschwandneri; Antheraea rumphii celebensis; Antheraea cordifolia sumatrana; Antheraea frithi javanensis

= Antheraea celebensis =

Species of moth

Antheraea celebensis is a moth of the family Saturniidae first described by Watson in 1915. It is found in Sulawesi and Sundaland.
