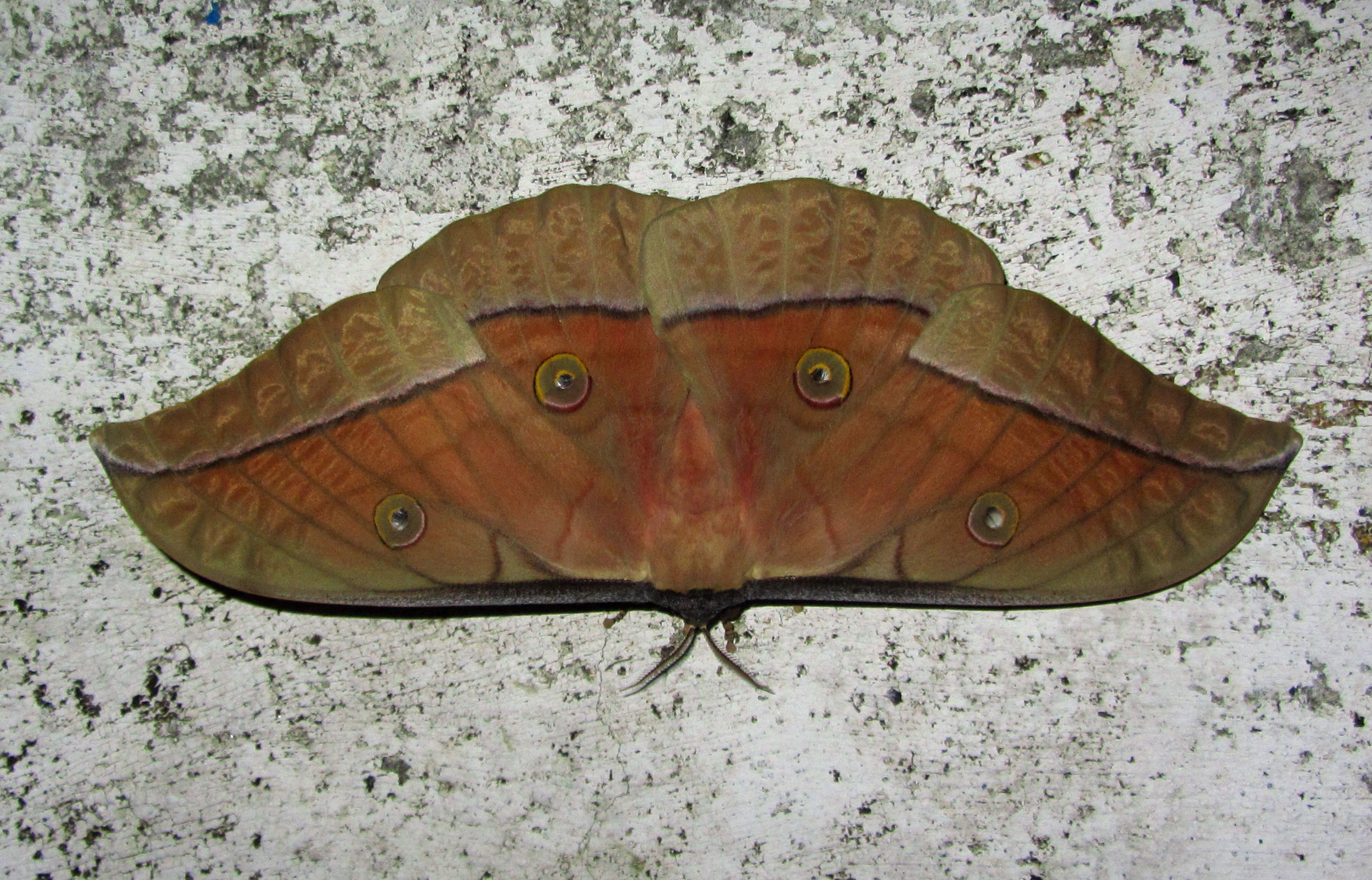

Scientific classification
- Kingdom: Animalia
- Phylum: Arthropoda
- Clade: Pancrustacea
- Class: Insecta
- Order: Lepidoptera
- Family: Saturniidae
- Genus: Antheraea
- Species: A. roylei

Binomial name
- Antheraea roylei Moore, 1859

Synonyms
- Antheraea roylii Moore, 1859 (Nomen oblitum); Antheraea pernyi roylei Moore, 1859

= Antheraea roylei =

Species of moth

Antheraea roylei is a large moth in the family Saturniidae occurring in Nepal, Thailand, Burma, Vietnam, West Malaysia, and the Himalayan regions of India, as well as Northern Pakistan. The species is considered to be the wild progenitor of the domesticated species known as Antheraea pernyi; the theory is that pernyi may have evolved from ancestral A. roylei by chromosome rearrangement during domestication.

== Taxonomic status ==
A 2013 application to the International Commission on Zoological Nomenclature, acting on the presumption that A. roylei and A. pernyi are the same biological species, asked to give precedence to the junior name (roylei), as it is a wild taxon and not the result of domestication. However, the 2018 Opinion on this application ruled that any authors who believe that A. roylei (spelled that way rather than "roylii") and A. pernyi are the same species must use the older name, pernyi, as the valid name, despite its origin as a taxon of artificial origin, in large part because other researchers had come forward and claimed that the genetic evidence clearly showed that the two taxa were not conspecific.
