= Wild silk =

Silk fibre from non-domesticated silkworms

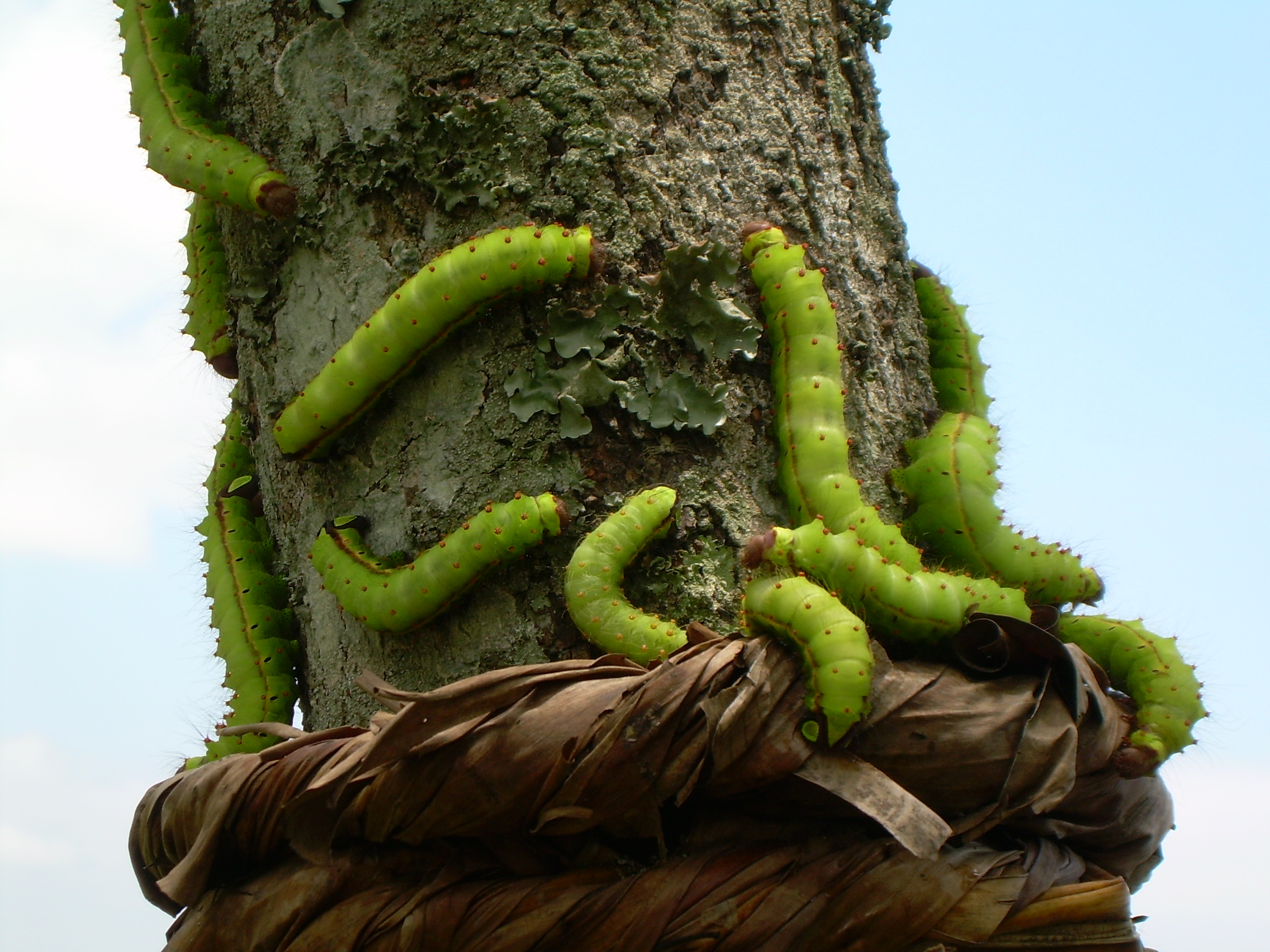
Muga silkworms on a som tree

Wild silks have been known and used in many countries from early times, although the scale of production is far smaller than that from cultivated silkworms. Silk cocoons and nests often resemble paper or cloth, and their use has arisen independently in many societies.

== Background ==
Silk taken from various species has been used since ancient times, either in its natural state or after some form of preparation. Spider webs were used as a wound dressing in ancient Greece and Rome, and as a base for painting from the 16th century. Caterpillar nests were used to make containers and fabric in the Aztec Empire.

To make a woven fabric, silk threads must first be either carded and spun, or extracted as a single intact thread. Commercially reared silkworms of the species Bombyx mori (Linnaeus, 1758) are normally killed before the pupae emerge, either by pricking them with a needle or dipping the cocoons into boiling water, thus allowing the whole cocoon to be unravelled as one continuous thread. This allows a much finer cloth to be woven from the silk.

There are more than 500 species of wild silkworms in the world, although only a few (nearly all listed below) are used to produce cloth. They usually produce a tougher and rougher silk than that from domesticated B. mori. Wild silks are usually harvested after the moths have left the cocoons, cutting the threads in the process, so that there is not one long thread, as with domesticated silkworms.

Wild silks are more difficult to bleach and dye than silk from Bombyx mori, but most have naturally attractive colours, particularly the rich golden sheen of the silk produced by the muga silkworm from Assam, often known as Assam silk.

The cocoon shells of wild silk moths are toughened or stabilized either by tanning (cross-linking) or by mineral reinforcements (e.g. calcium oxalate). In 2011, a new method was developed for demineralizing silk, which can remove the mineral reinforcements present in wild silks and enables wet reeling like the commercial silkworm.

== Wild silk industry in India ==
Wild silks are often referred to in India as 'Vanya' silks:

The term 'Vanya' is of Sanskrit origin, meaning untamed, wild, or forest-based. Muga, Tasar, and Eri silkworms are not fully tamed and the world calls the silks they produce as 'wild silks'.

India produces four kinds of silk: mulberry, tasar, muga and eri. The silkworm Bombyx mori is fed on mulberry leaves cultivated in plantations. Silkworms are also found wild on forest trees, e.g Antheraea paphia which produces the tasar silk (Tussah). Antheraea paphia feeds on several trees such as Anogeissus latifolia, Terminalia tomentosa, T. arjuna (Terminalia arjuna), Lagerstroemia parviflora and Madhuca indica. Antheraea assamensis produces muga silk, and another wild silkworm (Samia ricini) produces eri silk. The estimated annual production of tasar silk is 130 tonnes. Production of other types of silk exceeds 10 000 tonnes (Gupta 1994).

In 2015, the complete sequence and the protein structure of Muga Silk Fibroin was analyzed and published.

The eri silk worm from India feeds on the leaves of the castor plant. It is the only completely domesticated silkworm other than Bombyx mori. The silk is extremely durable, but cannot be easily reeled off the cocoon and is thus spun like cotton or wool.

== Wild silk industry in China ==
Tussah silk (Antheraea pernyi), one of the principal types of wild silk, is produced in several Chinese provinces. Peer-reviewed studies indicate that this type of silk is harder to dye than regular (mulberry) silk. The colour does not stick as well when using conventional dyeing methods, although using specialised methods (particularly neutral boiling dyeing with certain reactive dyes) it can still be dyed successfully and the colour will stay in well even after washing.

== History ==
=== Central and South Asia ===
Wild silk threads have been found and identified from two Indus River sites, Harappa and Chanhu-daro, dating to c. 2450–2000 BCE. This is roughly the same period as the earliest evidence of silk use in China, which is generally thought to have had the oldest silk industry in the world. The specimens of threads from Harappa appear on scanning electron microscope analysis to be from two different species of silk moth, Antheraea paphia and A. assamensis, while the silk from Chanhu-daro may be from a Philosamia species (eri silk), and this silk appears to have been reeled.

=== China ===
Wild silks were in use in China from early times. Moreover, the Chinese were aware of their use in the Roman Empire and apparently imported goods made from them by the time of the Later Han Dynasty in the 1st to 3rd centuries CE.

=== Greece and the Middle East ===
There are significant indications in the literature that wild silks were in use in Persia and in Greece by the late 5th century BCE, apparently referred to as "Amorgina" or "Amorgian garments" in Greece. Pliny the Elder, in the 1st century CE, obviously had some knowledge of how wild silkworms' cocoons were produced and utilised on the island of Kos for coa vestis, even though his account included some fanciful ideas.

=== Central America ===
Wild silk was used and traded by the Aztecs, Mixtecs and Zapotecs at the time of Moctezuma (early 16th century CE). This silk came from the social caterpillars Euchiera socialis and Eutachyptera psidii, which produce communal silk nests that frequently reach 50 cm (20 inches) in length. The nests were cut open and pasted together to make a paper-like fabric.

Whole nests have also been use as purses and containers for liquid, and sections of nest silk have served as bandages and as a base for painting.

Silk fibres from the same species have been extracted and spun to make sashes. This practice was recorded in Oaxaca in 1986, but had ceased by 1997. It is uncertain when the wild fibres were first used in this way; one hypothesis is that the techniques were learned from 16th-century colonists, who taught local people to grow imported Bombyx, and later adapted to the local wild silks.

== List of wild silk moths and their silk ==
- Antheraea assamensis (Helfer, 1837) – from Assam. Its silk has a beautiful glossy golden hue which improves with age and washing. It is never bleached or dyed and is stain resistant. The silk was reserved for the exclusive use of royal families in Assam for 600 years. In 2015, the Centre for DNA Fingerprinting and Diagnostics, Hyderabad, India, discovered the molecular characters of muga silk fibroin which are responsible for the golden luster and tensile strength.
- Antheraea paphia (Linnaeus, 1758) – the "tasar" silkworm.
- Antheraea pernyi (Guénerin-Méneville, 1855) – the Chinese tussah moth. The colour and quality of the silk depends on the climate and soil.
- Antheraea yamamai (Guénerin-Méneville, 1861) – the tensan (天蚕) silk moth. The tensan silk moth has been cultivated in Japan for more than 1,000 years. It produces a naturally white silk but does not dye well, though it is very strong and elastic. It is now very rare and expensive.
- Anaphe – from Nigeria. Caterpillars live on tamarind trees and colonies of several hundred spin communal cocoons. The cocoon's outer layers are beige, while inner layers enclosing each individual are white. Cocoons are boiled in water and wood ash to remove the gum binding filaments together and washed clean. When spun and woven the resulting cloth is coarse, and lacks the sheen of commercial silk.
- Bombyx mandarina (Moore) – Possibly a wild form of B. mori.
- Bombyx sinensis – from China. B. sinensis produces prolific but small cocoons.
- Borocera cajani – Malagasy silk worm
- Cricula trifenestrata – from India to the Philippines, Sulawesi, Java, and Sri Lanka.
- Eucheira socialis – the Madrone butterfly from central America. It produces large silken nests used by indigenous peoples.
- Eutachyptera psidii – from central America (also known as Gloveria psidii). It produces nests that have been used in a similar way to those of Euchiera socialis.
- Gonometa postica Walker – from the Kalahari region.
- Gonometa rufobrunnea Aurivillius. G. rufobrunnea feeds on the mopane tree in southern Africa.
- Pachypasa otus – around the Western Mediterranean. The probable source for Roman coa vestis.
- Samia cynthia (Drury, 1773) – the ailanthus silkmoth, a somewhat domesticated silkworm from China. Introduced into North America. The eri silkmoth from Assam is a subspecies of this moth (S. cynthia ricini). It produces a white silk which resembles wool mixed with cotton, but feels like silk.
