= Dilip Barooah =

Assamese author and social entrepreneur

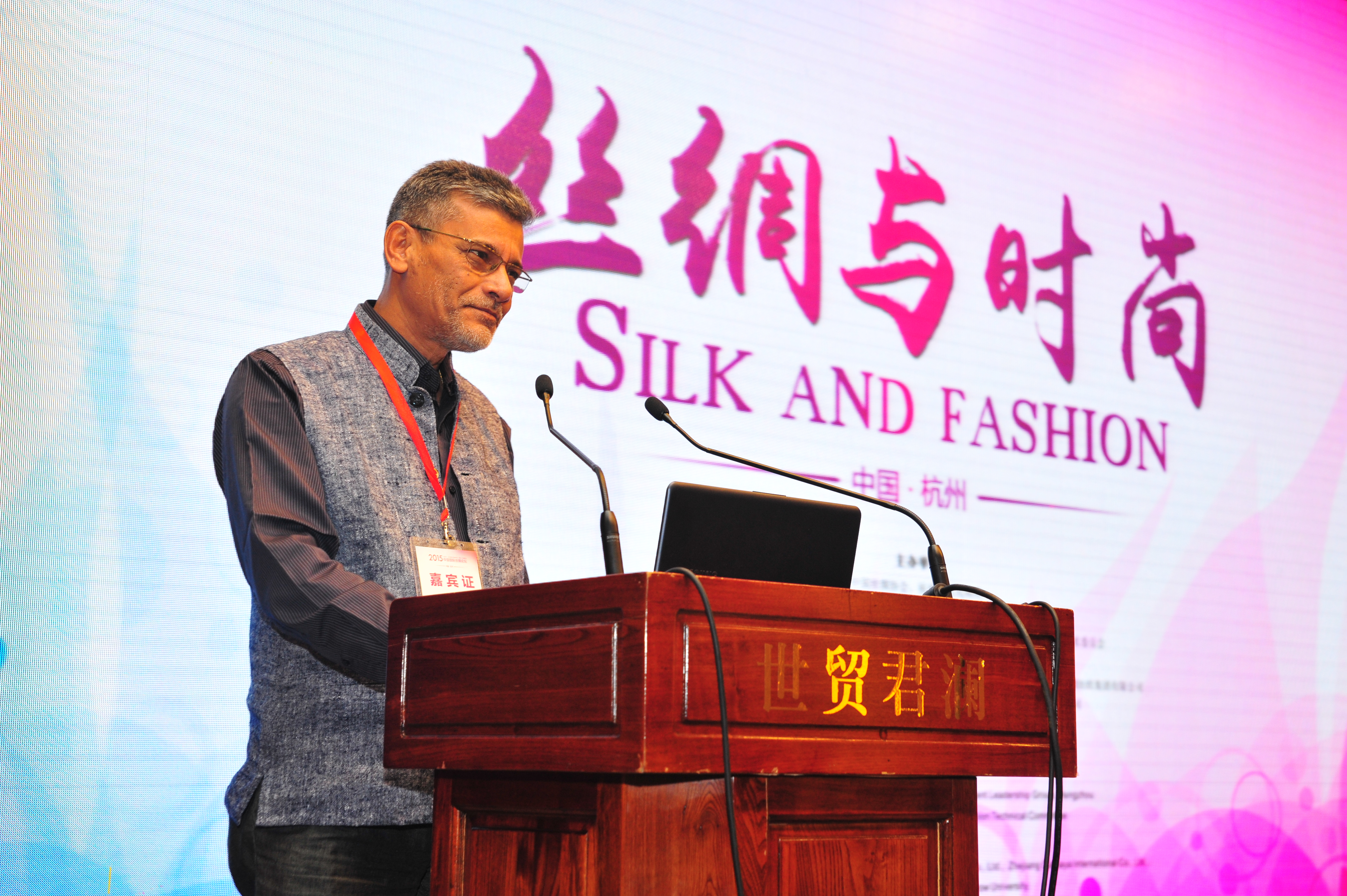
Dilip Barooah at ISU (International Silk Union)

Dilip Barooah (5 August 1957 - 19 August 2020) was an Assamese author and Social Entrepreneur who is credited to be the pioneer of manufacturing of Eri Silk in the North East of India.

== Publications ==
- South Asian Ways of Silk: A Patchwork of Biology, Manufacture, Culture and History
- Indian ways of silk : precious threads bridging India's past, present and future
- Understanding Morphology, next to Skin Comfort, and Change of Properties during Washing of Knitted Blends of Eri Silk

== Early life and career ==
Dilip Barooah was born August 5, 1957, in Margherita, Assam, in northeastern India. Dilip studied at the Assam Textiles Institute. In the early eighties he worked at a textile mill in Mumbai as a manager and then moved to Germany and South Africa. He came back to Assam to advance the industrial growth supported by the government of Assam.

Barooah founded Fabric Plus Pvt Ltd in Mumbai in 2003. Adding value to local raw materials with innovation had Fabric Plus catering to fashion giants like Armani, Hugo Boss, Just Cavalli, Chopard and Moschino among other brands. As a social entrepreneur for Chhaygaon, Barooah helped the region's growth. The Eri silk spinning mill impacted the lives of 350 spinners and weavers and benefitted 4,500 people engaged in producing silk/cocoon and marketing. Barooah played a significant role in redefining the term "sustainable silk" and its "authenticity".

Up-cycling of reeling waste from Muga silk was a new process introduced by Dilip. By up-cycling the waste procured from the silk reeling process, Dilip was able to convert them back into yarns. This practice was the first achievement of its kind with Muga silk.

Dilip also established Rudrasagar Silk Ltd with the help of the Textile Ministry of India to produce High quality Eri and Muga Silk.

== Awards/Recognition ==
- Indira Gandhi Priyadarshini Award
- True Legends Awards 2016 Northeast

== Death ==
Dilip Barooah died on 19 August 2020 at around 11:30 pm due to COVID-19 related complications.
