= Martha Clokie =

Microbiologist

- Born: Martha Rebecca Jane Clokie
- Education: University of Dundee (BSc); University of Edinburgh (MSc); University of Leicester (PhD)
- Scientific career
- Fields: Microbiology
- Workplaces: University of Leicester; Scripps Institution of Oceanography; University of Warwick
- Thesis: Molecular studies of Southern Hemisphere disjunction in three plant genera, Eucryphia, Griselinia and Coriaria (2001)
- Website: www2.le.ac.uk/departments/genetics/people/martha-clokie

Martha Rebecca Jane Clokie is a professor of microbiology at the University of Leicester. Her research investigates the identification and development of bacteriophages that kill pathogens in an effort to develop new antimicrobials.

== Education ==
Clokie studied biology at the University of Dundee. She graduated in 1996 and moved to Edinburgh, where she started a postgraduate degree in biodiversity. She earned a master's degree at the University of Edinburgh in 1997 and moved to Leicester. Clokie earned her doctoral degree in molecular ecology at the University of Leicester in 2001 for research on the evolution of three genera of plants: Eucryphia, Griselinia and Coriaria.

== Research and career ==
After her PhD, Clokie was a postdoctoral researcher at the University of Warwick and the Scripps Institution of Oceanography. Clokie started her research career investigating the molecular evolution of plants.

Clokie joined the University of Leicester as a lecturer in 2007 and was promoted to Professor in 2016. She is interested in viruses known as bacteriophages which can be used to treat disease. Her work involves cyanobacteria and the sequencing of various bacteriophages. She demonstrated that marine phages contain the genes responsible for photosynthesis, and that phages do not only exert pressure on the infection-survival mechanism of cyanobacteria but can acquire the genes of a bacteria's prey.

Her research includes identifying specific phage combinations that can be used to destroy Clostridioides difficile Infections (CDI) while maintaining a healthy gut. CDI causes almost two fifths of diarrhoea associated with antibiotics in the Western world, and one in ten of patients die due to a lack of effective treatment. The bacteriophage could reduce the growth of C. difficile and simultaneously defend beneficial bacterial that are typically destroyed by antibiotics. The bacteriophages can be delivered orally and result in destruction of C. difficile within two days. Clokie went on to demonstrate that C. difficile can evolve into a new species, with a specific strand that is adapted to spread quickly in hospitals. The new species survives on the sugar-rich diets of Westerners and can evade common disinfectants.

She has also worked on bacteriophages that can be used to prevent bacterial infections in Antheraea assamensis (Muga silkworms). Muga silk is produced in Assam and is one of the most valuable silks in the world. They are at risk from Flacherie, a bacterial disease that is caused by larvae eating infected leaves. Alongside working on silk worms, Clokie has explored the use of phages in the treatment of drug resistant urinary tract infections. She has shown that bacteriophages could be used to treat bacterial disease in pigs. These phages disable the Salmonella bacterial disease that infects pigs and can be added to pig feed.

Clokie maintained bacteriophages were helping growing numbers of patients in compassionate use cases and could become routine for conditions like chronic UTIs and diabetic foot ulcers. Clokie stated “The risk from antibiotic resistance is dire and getting worse … I find it really shocking. Unless we have clinical trials, phages won’t become mainstream as a medicine, and that’s where we’re aiming.(...) I get fairly regular emails from doctors and patients wanting phages. Doctors have gone from being completely disinterested to ‘give me the phages now’ (…) There are people who need phages now because they’re dying.”

=== Selected publications ===
Her publications include;

- Bacteriophages: Methods and Protocols
- Phages in nature
- Marine cyanophages and light
- Bacterial photosynthesis genes in a virus

Clokie is founding editor-in-chief of the journal PHAGE: Therapy, Applications and Research.

=== Awards and honours ===
Clokie was awarded a Grand Challenges exploration fund award from the Bill & Melinda Gates Foundation. This allowed her to investigate bacteriophages that could be used to eradicate Shigellosis. In 2019 Clokie was interviewed on the BBC Radio 4 programme The Life Scientific.
