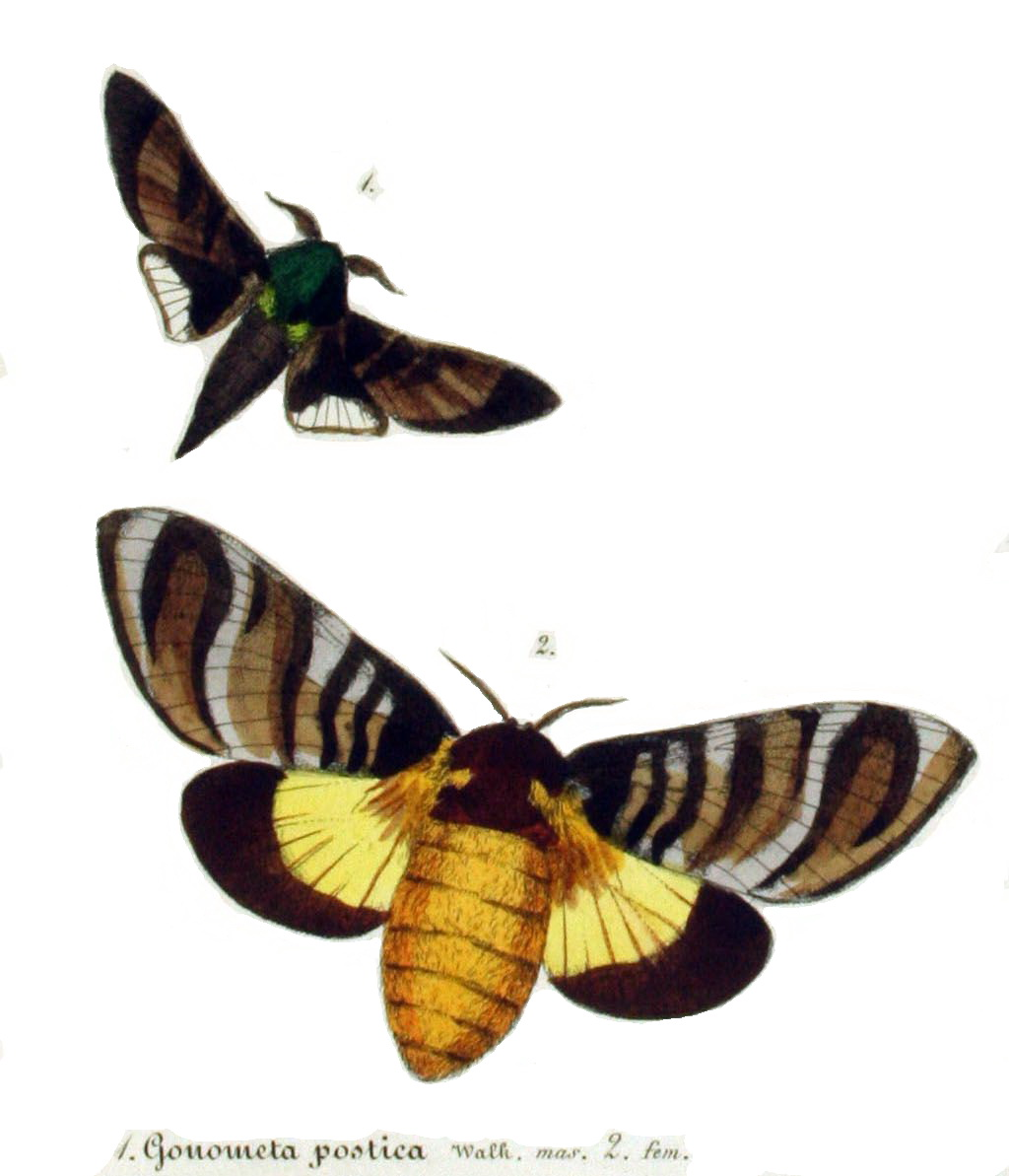
- male and female

Scientific classification
- Kingdom: Animalia
- Phylum: Arthropoda
- Clade: Pancrustacea
- Class: Insecta
- Order: Lepidoptera
- Family: Lasiocampidae
- Genus: Gonometa
- Species: G. postica

Binomial name
- Gonometa postica Walker, 1855

Synonyms
- Gonometa effusa Walker, 1865; Gonometa marginata Walker 1881

= Gonometa postica =

Species of moth

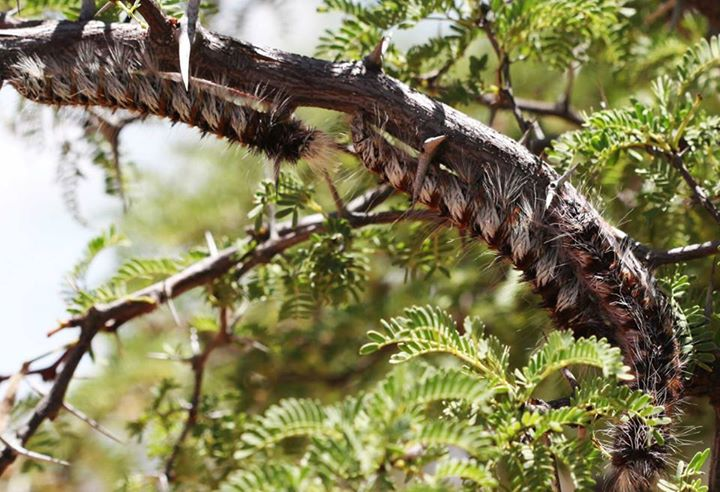

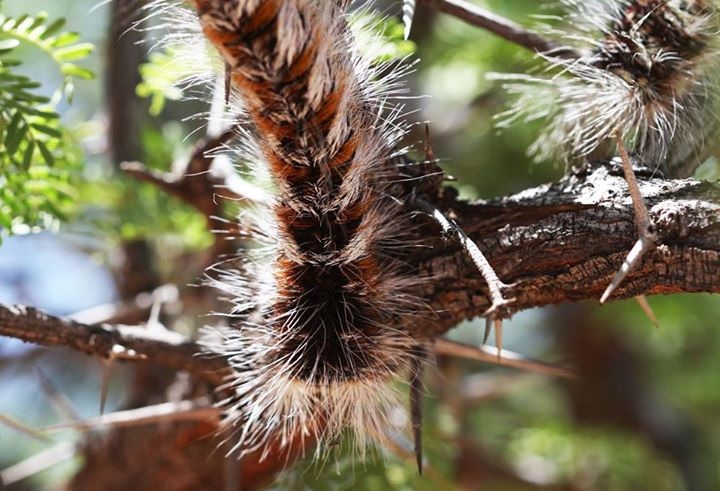

Gonometa postica (Walker, 1855), known commonly as the African wild silk moth, burn worm, and brandwurm, is a large species of African moth belonging to the family Lasiocampidae. The genus Gonometa boasts some very large moths and larvae; Gonometa sjostedti from Africa has a larva 16 centimeters long, for example. Most of the Lasiocampidae are highly sexually dimorphic. In G. postica the forewing of the male measures 21–25 mm and of the female 35–42 mm.

Gonometa postica and Argema mimosae cocoons are traditionally used as ankle rattles in southern Africa by San and Bantu tribes. They are filled with materials such as fine gravel, seeds, glass beads, broken sea shells, or pieces of ostrich eggshell.

The species has become notable for producing a fine quality wild silk in its cocoon. The cocoons are harvested commercially in Namibia, Botswana, Kenya and South Africa, and the species also occurs in Zimbabwe and Mozambique. An Oxford University research team found that the cocoon surfaces are covered with calcium oxalate, hindering their commercial utilisation. They discovered and patented a method known as demineralizing using a warm solution of EDTA (ethylenediaminetetraacetic acid), softening the cocoons by dissolving the sericin, permitting the silk to be unravelled with no appreciable loss of strength. Cocoons are also sexually dimorphic, with those of females being roughly twice the size of those of males, thus yielding more silk. Sex ratios in natural populations will clearly play a large role in the harvesting of cocoons.

The larvae are quite variable in their patterning and, like many of the genus, are covered in irritating setae, or hairs. The larva is black with lateral tufts of white, yellow or orange. It has been recorded feeding on Acacia, Brachystegia, Elephantorrhiza, Pinus radiata, and Julbernardia. Another silk-producing member of the genus is Gonometa rufobrunnea (Aurivillius, 1927), which feeds almost exclusively on Colophospermum mopane. G. postica larvae and pupae are subject to parasitism by Diptera and Hymenoptera, the most common parasitoids being Palexorista species from the Tachinidae and Goryphus species from the Ichneumonidae.

The cocoons have long been known to cause the death of cattle, antelope and other ruminants in the Kalahari. During drought periods, the cocoons are eaten, probably because they resemble acacia pods. The silk is indigestible and blocks the rumen of multiple-stomached animals, causing starvation.

In Madagascar, wild silk has been harvested for centuries, and this expertise has been introduced to southern Africa. A feasibility study was funded by Oxfam and the Namibian Ministry of Agriculture, and a pilot project was started in Leonardville. A number of other moth species suited to silk harvesting are Attacus atlas, Antheraea paphia, Antheraea pernyi, Cricula andrei, and Samia canningi.

Gonometa fibroin is rich in basic amino acids, making it a potentially useful biomaterial in cell and tissue culture.
