= Cricula ceylonica =

Sri Lanka cricula silkmoth

Scientific classification
- Kingdom: Animalia
- Phylum: Arthropoda
- Clade: Pancrustacea
- Class: Insecta
- Order: Lepidoptera
- Family: Saturniidae
- Genus: Cricula
- Species: C. ceylonica

Binomial name
- Cricula ceylonica Jordan, 1909

Synonyms
- Cricula trifenestrata ceylonica Jordan, 1909

Species of moth

Cricula ceylonica, the Sri Lankan cricula silkmoth, is a moth of the family Saturniidae. The species was first described by Karl Jordan in 1909 and it is endemic to Sri Lanka. The debate of this species with much broader range circular species - Cricula trifenestrata is not yet fully understood. However, Rougerie et al., in 2009 considered Cricula ceylonica a valid species, probably endemic to Sri Lanka.

== Taxonomy ==
Very similar to C. trifenestrata, therefore many texts and agricultural publications still classified the Sri Lankan population under C. trifenestrata as its subspecies, C. trifenestrata ceylonica. The revision of the two species needs more clarifications and researches.

== Description ==
The wingspan is 60–100 mm. Adult male has clayish-ochraceous wings. The transparent spot on the forewing is lined by a broad black ring. Subapical lobe of clasper broad. Female has tawny-ochraceous wings. There are three transparent spots on the forewing lined by broad black rings. On the ventral side, the transparent spots of both wings more strongly edged with black. Larval host plants are Cinnamomum zeylanicum and Mangifera indica.
