= Ahimsa silk =

Type of silk obtained without killing silkworms

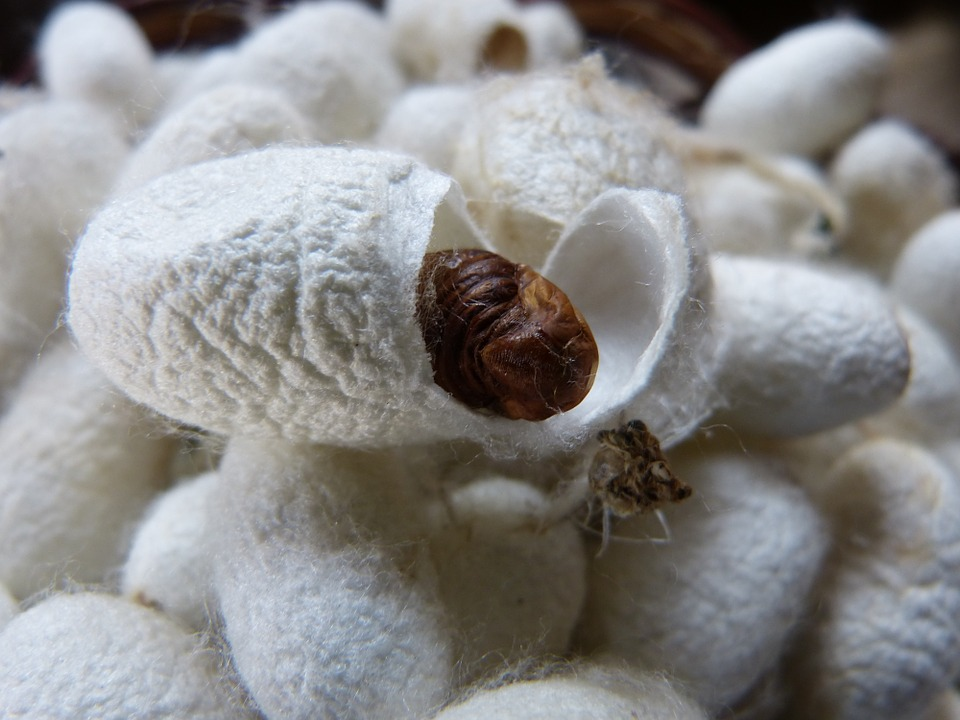
A cut silkworm cocoon

Ahimsa silk (ahiṃsā: Sanskrit for 'nonviolence'), also known as peace silk is a method of nonviolent silk breeding and harvesting. Wild silk moths are bred rather than the domestic variety. It allows the completion of the metamorphosis of the silkworm to its moth stage, whereas most silk harvesting requires the silkworms to be killed in their cocoon stage. Allegedly, no animals suffer or die for the silk to be produced, making it a favourable alternative to normal silk for those who object to harming animals.

== Process ==
The pupa is allowed to hatch and the leftover cocoon is then used to create silk.

While the Bombyx mori (also called mulberry silkworm or mulberry silk moth) are the preferred species for creating ahimsa silk, there are a few other types of species that fall under the category of ahimsa silk, which is defined not necessarily by the species of the moth involved but by the methods for harvesting the cocoon. The other types of silkworm that are used for this process are a subspecies of the ailanthus silkmoth and several types of tussah or Tasar moths: the Chinese tussah moth, the Indian Tasar moth, and the muga moth.

The subspecies of the ailanthus silkmoth, Samia cynthia ricini, eat the leaves of the castor bean or cassava leaves. It is also known as the eri silkmoth. Eri silk is made from the cocoons of these particular insects and is also produced using less violent methods than the normal heat treating, but the quality of Eri silk is often seen as inferior to that of the silk created by the offspring of the Bombyx mori moth.

== Qualities ==
The main qualities of ahimsa silk are derived from the ideals surrounding the concept of non-violence. This allows the silk to be manufactured without harm to the beings that created it. These ideals appeal to religions like Jainism, Hinduism and Buddhism whose followers forgo all injury to other forms of life. Non-violent lifestyle proponents have more recently found peace silk to be in keeping with their way of life.

Peace silk requires 10 extra days in the process to let the pupae mature and the moths to hatch out of the cocoons. In contrast, the standard process takes about 15 minutes, killing the pupa as soon as possible after the cocoon is completed. After the moth has emerged and broken the silk fibers, the cocoon yields one-sixth of the harvestable filament. This inflates the cost of nonviolent silk, which is priced at roughly 6,000 rupees (US$92) per kilogram—about twice the price of the regular kind.

== Disputing ethical claims ==
Ahimsa silk may not be completely ethical and cruelty-free. An investigation by Beauty Without Cruelty in India said that, in at least one facility, Sericulture Federation at Dharmavaram, the mating adults were killed:

On emerging from the cocoons, male and female moths are kept together for three hours to mate. The females are then segregated and placed in trays to lay eggs. The males are put into the refrigerator and kept in a semi-frozen condition and brought out again and again to mate. After their power to mate diminishes they are thrown away in the dustbin and linger to death. The females that have laid eggs are immediately ground in a mixer and their crushed bodies checked under a microscope. If any disease is detected, the hundreds of eggs they just laid are also destroyed immediately.

== See also ==
- Ahimsa
- Buddhist ethics
- History of silk
- Kausheya, an ancient Indian wild silk
- Samia cynthia
