= Coa vestis =

Wild silk textile from the island of Kos, used for clothing in Ancient Greece and Rome

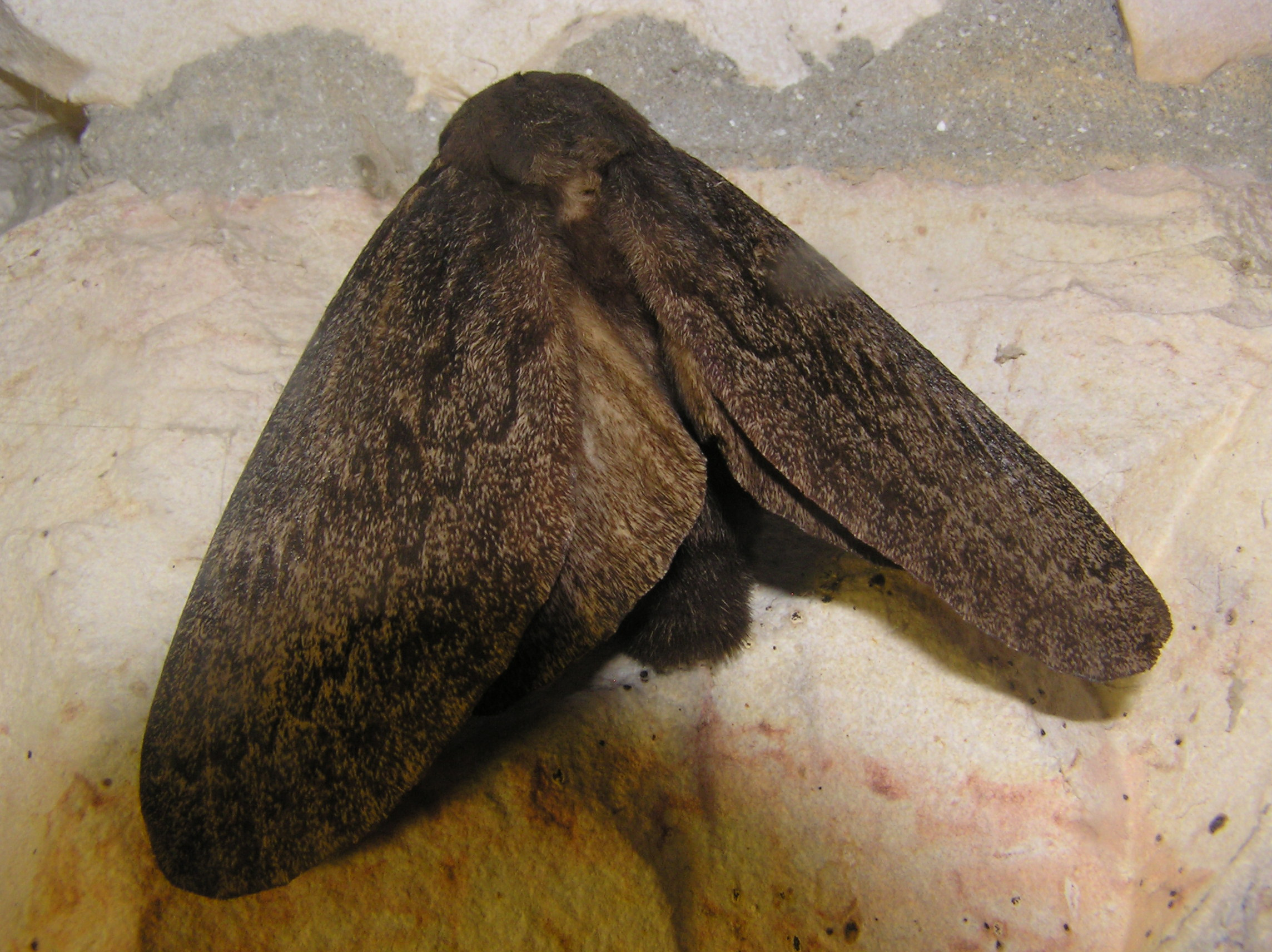
Pachypasa otus

Coa vestis is an ancient type of fabric named after its point of origin, the Greek island Kos.

Coa vestis was made by the wild silk of Pachypasa otus, a Mediterranean moth. Aristotle first mentioned coa vestis in the 4th century BC.

The elder Pliny reported Pamphila of Kos, daughter of Plateas, discovered the secret of silk manufacture.

After the 1st century AD the coa vestis was gradually superseded by Chinese silk, which was superior in quality.
