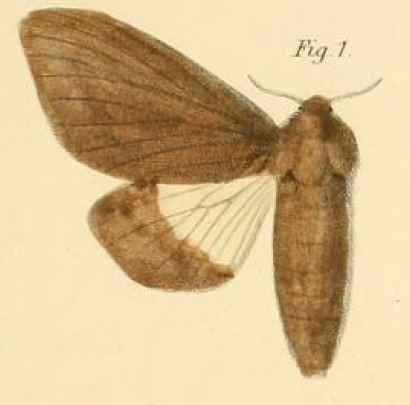

Scientific classification
- Kingdom: Animalia
- Phylum: Arthropoda
- Class: Insecta
- Order: Lepidoptera
- Family: Lasiocampidae
- Genus: Gonometa
- Species: G. bicolor

Binomial name
- Gonometa bicolor Dewitz, 1881

= Gonometa bicolor =

Species of moth

Gonometa bicolor is a moth of the family Lasiocampidae. It is known from Angola.
