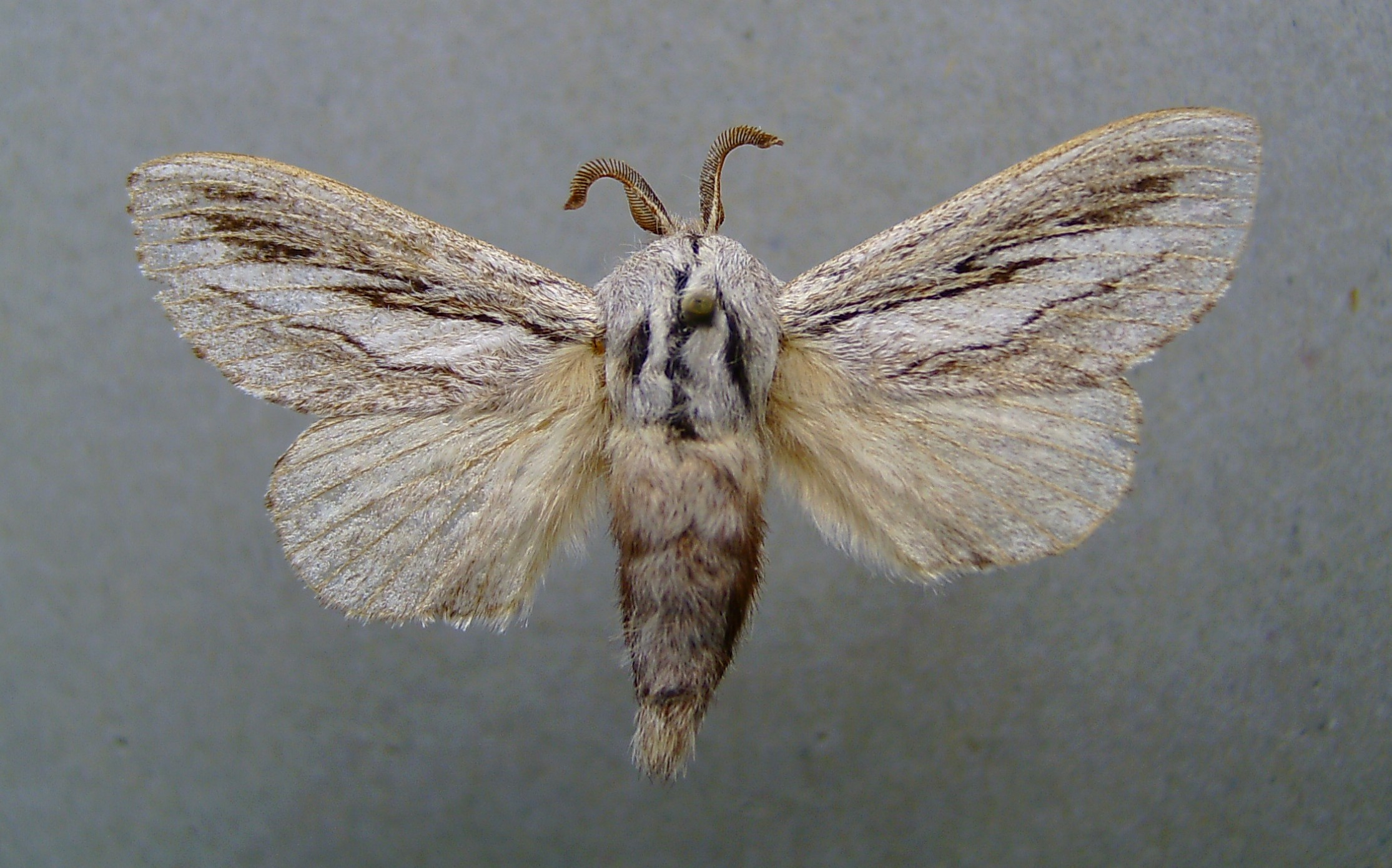

Scientific classification
- Kingdom: Animalia
- Phylum: Arthropoda
- Clade: Pancrustacea
- Class: Insecta
- Order: Lepidoptera
- Family: Lasiocampidae
- Genus: Pachypasa
- Species: P. limosa

Binomial name
- Pachypasa limosa (de Villiers, 1827)

Synonyms
- Pachypasa powelli Oberthür, 1916; Pachypasa intermedia Rothschild, 1917; Pachypasa souresi Chnéour, 1955; Pachypasa lineosa (Villiers, 1826)

= Pachypasa limosa =

Species of moth

Pachypasa limosa is a moth of the family Lasiocampidae. It is found in southern France, the Iberian Peninsula and North Africa.

The wingspan is 20–23 mm. Adults are on wing from June to July.

Recorded food plants include Cupressus and Juniperus species.

== Sources ==
- P.C.-Rougeot, P. Viette (1978). Guide des papillons nocturnes d'Europe et d'Afrique du Nord. Delachaux et Niestlé (Lausanne).
