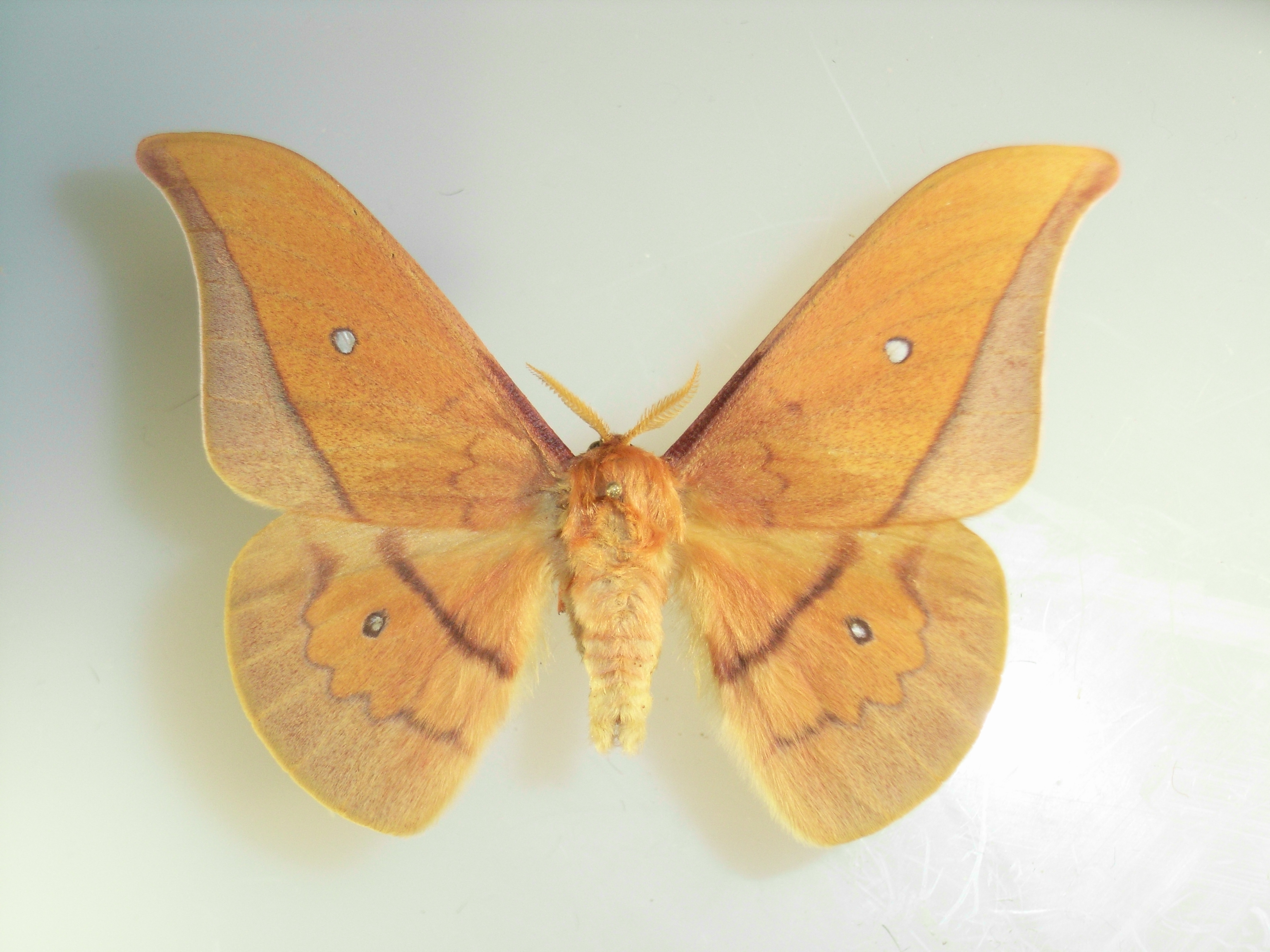

Scientific classification
- Kingdom: Animalia
- Phylum: Arthropoda
- Class: Insecta
- Order: Lepidoptera
- Family: Saturniidae
- Tribe: Saturniini
- Genus: Cricula; Walker, 1855

Synonyms
- Euphranor Herrich-Schäffer, 1855; Euphranor Herrich-Schäffer, [1856]

= Cricula =

Genus of moths

Cricula is a genus of moths in the family Saturniidae first described by Francis Walker in 1855.

== Species ==
- Cricula agria Jordan, 1909
- Cricula andamanica Jordan, 1909
- Cricula australosinica Brechlin, 2004
- Cricula australovietnama Brechlin, 2010
- Cricula bornea Watson, 1913
- Cricula cameronensis U. & L. Paukstadt, 1998
- Cricula ceylonica Jordan, 1909
- Cricula elaezia Jordan, 1909
- Cricula elaezioborneensis Brechlin, 2010
- Cricula elaeziopahangensis Brechlin, 2010
- Cricula elaeziosumatrana Brechlin, 2010
- Cricula flavoglena Chu & Wang, 1993
- Cricula hainanensis Brechlin, 2004
- Cricula hayatiae U. Paukstadt & Suhardjono, 1992
- Cricula jordani Bryk, 1944
- Cricula kalimantanensis Brechlin, 2010
- Cricula kransi Jurriaanse & Lindemans, 1920
- Cricula luzonica Jordan, 1909
- Cricula mindanaensis Naessig & Treadaway, 1997
- Cricula palawanica Brechlin, 2001
- Cricula quinquefenestrata Roepke, 1940
- Cricula sichuana Brechlin, 2010
- Cricula sumatrensis Jordan, 1939
- Cricula tonkintrifenestratoides Brechlin, 2010
- Cricula trifenestrata (Helfer, 1837)
- Cricula trifenestratoides Brechlin, 2010
- Cricula vietnama Brechlin, Naessig & Naumann, 1999
- Cricula zubsiana Naessig, 1985
