= Dukula =

Ancient Indian cloth

Dukula was an ancient Indian cloth made from the bark of trees. Some contemporary varieties kshauma, netra, and tiritpatta including Dukul were among the fabrics that were comparable to silk. Some sources suggest that Dukula was silk, but actually it was made of bark fiber. As a result, it was fine linen. According to Amarasimha, the word "dukula" was a synonym for "ksauma" (linen).

== Mentions ==
Dukula (especially with the swan pattern) is recognized as arguably the finest cloth in the Gupta period literature.Bāṇabhaṭṭa, a seventh-century scholar (who was the Asthana Kavi in the court of King Harsha Vardhana), also makes reference to "hansa dukula", a material patterned with hansa (swan or goose). The gods and kings wore it. The Harshacharita (King Harsha Vardhana of Kanauj's biography) lists a variety of textiles, Banabhatta describes a range of textiles displayed during an exhibition at Harsha's sister's (Rajyashri's) wedding. "Dukula," "amshuka," "kshauma," "badara," and "netra" are among the names he mentions.

Kumārasambhava poem of Kalidasa also refers to "dukula" while comparing the attire of Lord Shiva and the Hindu goddess Parvati. Kalidasa also mentioned Dukula in Vikramōrvaśīyam and Ṛtusaṃhāra. He referred to Dukula as silk.

== Production ==
Bengal was a well-known production centre for these types of cloths. Kautilya in Arthashastra acknowledges Bengal as a producer of Dukula.

== See also ==
- Kausheya (silk)
- Hamsa (bird)
