= Muga silk =

Variety of Indian wild silk

- Geographical indication
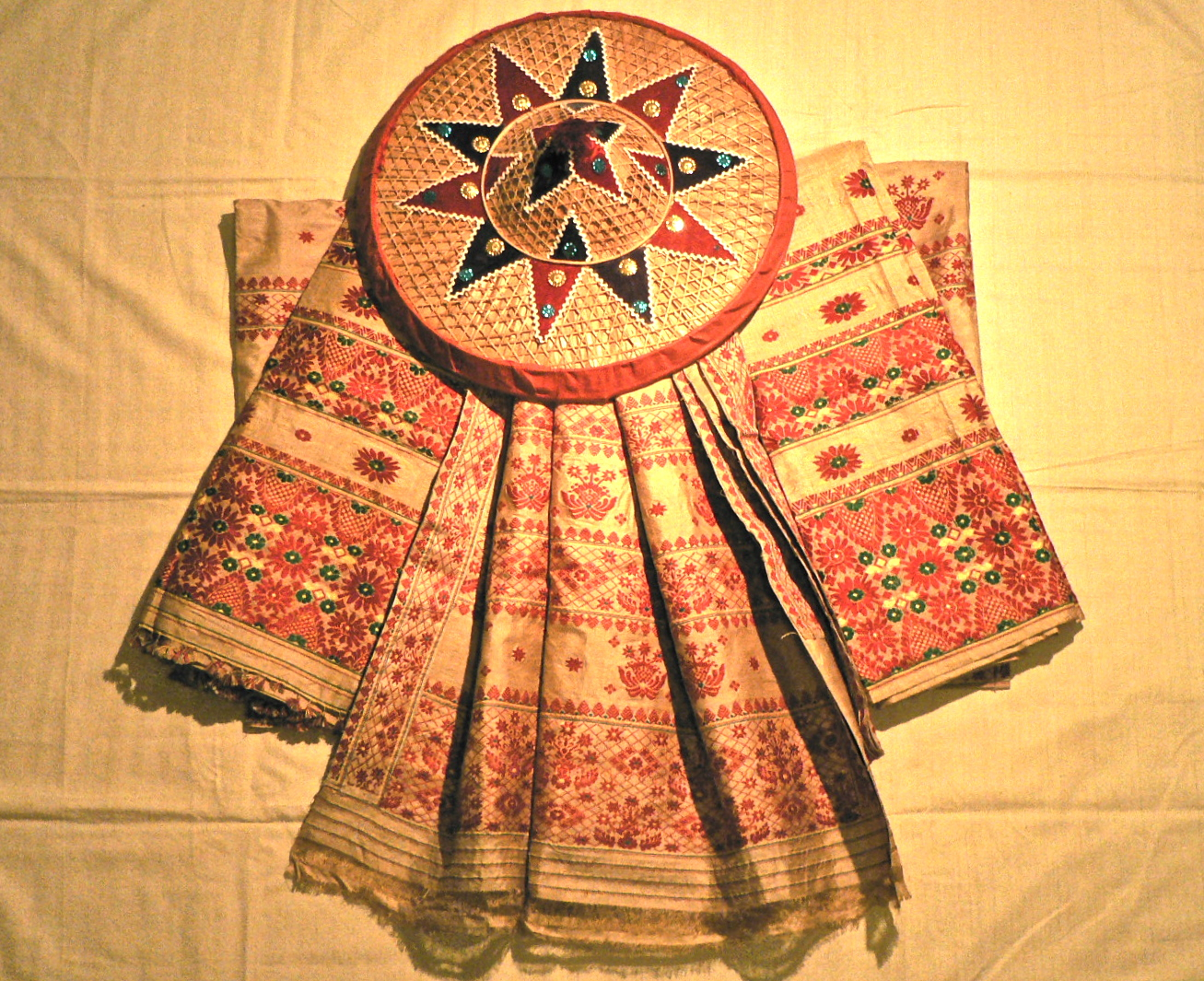
- Muga silk mekhala and chador with jaapi
- Description: Wild Silk from Assam with a yellowish golden tint
- Type: Handicraft
- Area: Assam
- Country: India
- Registered: 2007
- Material: Silk

Muga silk is a variety of wild silk geographically tagged to the state of Assam in India. The silk is known for its extreme durability and has a natural yellowish-golden tint with a shimmering, glossy texture. It was previously reserved for the use of royalty. Muga is one of the three major types of indigenous wild silks produced in Assam, and is a key variety of Assam silk renowned for its natural golden color

In the Brahmaputra Valley, the larvae of the Assam silkmoth feed on aromatic Som (Machilus bombycina) and Sualu (Litsea polyantha) leaves. Muga silk can be dyed after bleaching. This silk can be hand-washed with its lustre increasing after every wash. Muga silk, like other Assam silks, is used in products like saris, mekhalas and chadors.

== History ==
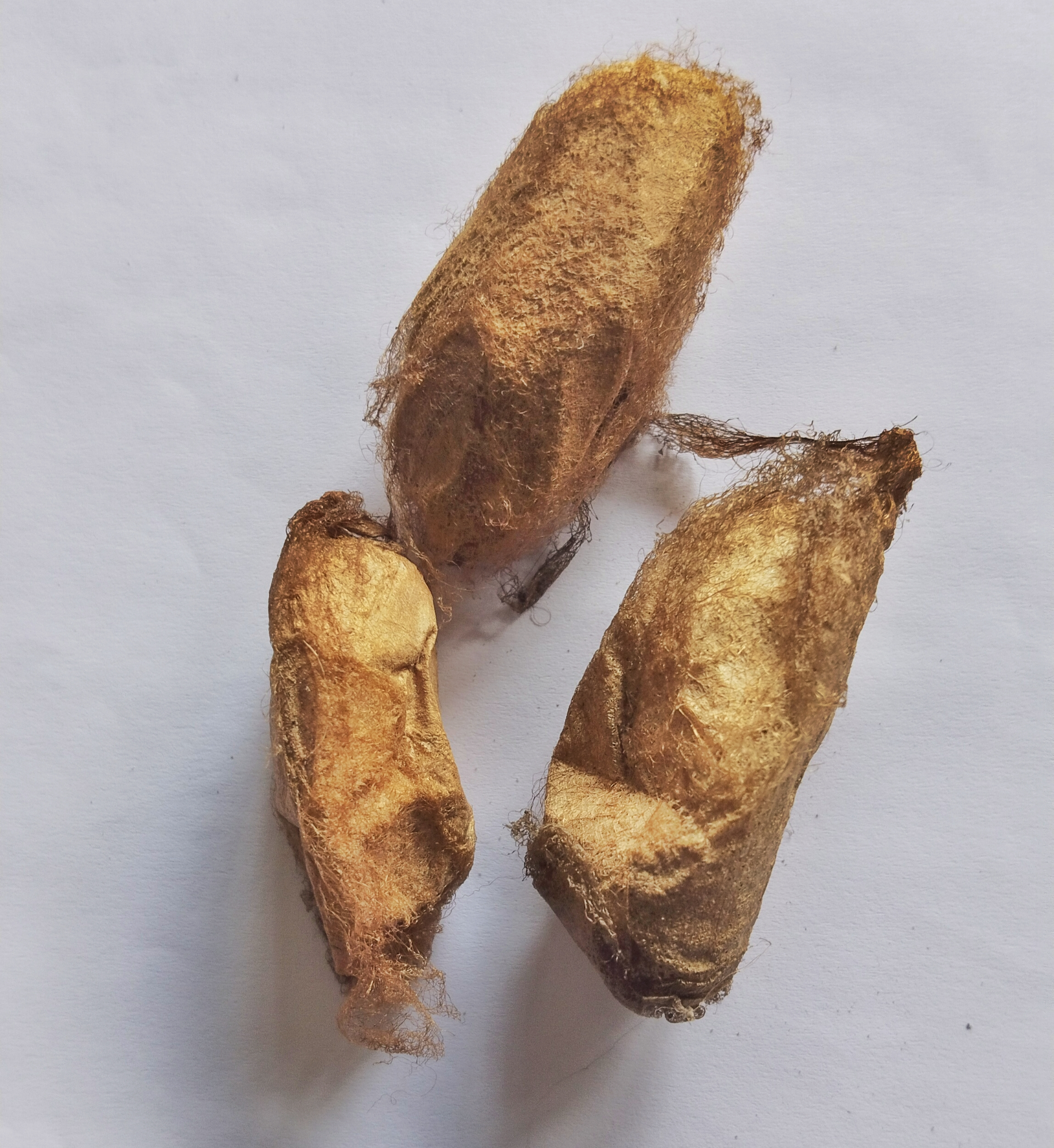
Muga cocoon

Sericulture in Assam is an ancient industry without a precise time of origin. Assam was well known for the production of high quality silk since ancient times. The craft of weaving goes along with the production of silk. It grew to such sophistication in Assam that it was known all over India and abroad. The first reference to Assam silk was probably in Valmiki's Ramayana. In the Kishkindha Kanda of Ramayana, it is stated that one travelling towards the east has to first pass through Magadha, Anga, Pundra and then the Kosha-karanam-bhumi ("the country of cocoon rearers"). Kautilya's Arthashastra, a political literature of the 3rd century BC, makes references to the highly sophisticated silk clothing from Assam. Kautilya mentions the production of Suvarnakudyaka (from Kamrupa) along with Vangika (from Vanga/southern Bengal), Magadhika (from Magadha) and Paundrika (from Pundra/northern Bengal), of which Suvarnakudyaka, Magadhika and Paundrika fabrics were types of Kauseya (Tussar/Muga) and Cina-patta (Mulberry silk). The fact that Kamrupa produced Suvarnakudyaka is confirmed by the 8th century writer Kumārila Bhaṭṭa who, in his commentary of Arthashatra, said that Kamrupa was Suvarnakudya (Kamarupeschaiva Suvarna Kudyah). As per the Arthashatra, the fibres of Suvarnakudyaka were of 'the colour of butter', 'as red as the sun', and of the best quality. Due to this description of colour, the type of silk can be easily identified as Muga. The text also refers to four trees (Vakula, Likucha, Vata and Naga-vriksa) which the silkworms feed on. Out of these, Vakula and Naga-vriksa belong to the genus Ericales and Magnolia which the Muga silkworm Antheraea assamensis is known to feed on; while Likucha (Artocarpus lakucha) and Vata belong to the genus Moraceae (Mulberry) which the Pat Silkworm feeds on. This is further confirmed from the 9th century thesaurus Amara-kosha which mentions that the worms of the fibre Patrorna (a form of white silk), fed on the leaves of Vata, Lakucha, etc. The Arthashastra also states that the fibre was spun while the threads were wet, indicating that the production method was still the same at that period. The ancient text Kalika Purana(dated between 10th-11th century) well records the use of silk in the worship of deities in ancient Kamrupa. As per the text, while worshipping the deities at the Dikkarvasini pitha(also known as Tamreswari of Sadiya), red, yellow and white Kauseya(meaning wild silk, probably Muga) were used to drap the idols of the presiding deities of the temple. It is known that Muga, in olden times, was available in yellow(natural), white(Mejankari muga) and often dyed red with lac.

The knowledge of sericulture probably arrived with the Tibeto-Burman groups which arrived from China around the period of 3000-2000 BC. Moreover, there was another trade of Silk through the Southwestern Silk road which started from China, passed through Burma and Assam, finally getting connected to the main silk road in Turkmenistan. There are various other records to show that Silk came to India through Assam. As per the Sanskrit text Harshacharita (biography of North Indian ruler Harshavardhan written by the court poet Banabhatta in the 7th century), during the coronation ceremony of King Harshavardhan, king Bhaskarvarman of Kamrupa gifted many precious items to the North Indian king. Out of this the most important ones include the precious fabrics and jewels. These included an umbrella wrapped by a dukula cloth, sacks of patta-sutra cloth as well as ksoma fabrics which were as pure as the autumn moon's light (sharada chandrama shaucha ksamani). These fabrics could either be silk or linen. It is also mentioned in the text that the loin fibres were so even and polished that it resembled Bhoj-patra, which could indicate silk as well. There are also references of Assam silk in the records written by Huen Sang where he has written the use and trade of silk in Kamrupa during the rule of king Bhaskar Varman. Ram Mohan Nath in his book "The Background of Assamese culture states that: "The Kiratas,(an early Mongoloid race in Assam, were traders in silk, a word that was derived from the Mongolian original word ‘sirkek’. The Indian word ‘sari’ is probably derived from the same word. “It is therefore clear that in ancient times traders from different parts of Tibet, Central Asia and China flocked to Assam through various routes, and as they traded mostly in silk, they were generally called Seres – Cirrahadoi – Syrities – Cirata-Kirata. The word Kirata therefore, is a general term referring to the people of the Mongolian origin and it refers specially to the Bodos.” These Bodos referred by Nath are today known as Bodo-Kacharis which includes groups such as Bodos, Chutias, Dimasas, Thengal, Rabhas, Sonowal, Garo, Koch and many more. J.Geoghegan in his book "Silk in India" states that: "It is the Kiratas who introduced the cultivation of silk with its different varieties in Assam and it is from Assam that Silk was later introduced to mainland India. Whatever may be the date of the introduction of the worm, its geographical distribution at present day, and the fact species first introduced was a multivoltine, seem to me to lead to the conclusion that the insect was first introduced into India from the north-east (i.e. Assam)".

Genetic research on silkworms show that Assam silk originated in two specific regions of Assam. One was Garo Hills in the ancient Kamrupa kingdom and the other was Dhakuakhana in the ancient Chutia kingdom. As per Buranjis, the Chutia king in 1524 AD gifted some golden coloured cloth(Sunali kapur in Assamese, Kham-sin in Tai) as a peace offering to the Ahom king, which may indicate the use of Muga(golden fibre) as royal clothing in the Chutia kingdom.

As per the Naoboicha Phukanar Buranji, Muga was adopted in the Ahom courts at later period. As per the text, one of the Ahom kings upon the advice of his ministers took the decision of introducing Muga, Paat clothing and employed a thousand Muga producers and weavers from the Chutia community to weave royal garments in the capital. Before that the Ahoms are said to have worn black-coloured clothes. In the Assam Buranji, the Ahoms are mentioned as "Lunda-Munda Kula Kapur pindha luk" (black-clothed men) in the 16th century, which denotes they wore black cotton clothes till the 16th century similar to the other Tais of Yunnan and Burma. Due to this adoption of the clothing style of native rulers, Muga production received patronage from the Ahom dynasty in the later period of their rule. Royalty and senior mandarins were prescribed clothing made of the silk. Ahom kings were known to keep many costly muga sets in the royal storehouse for presentation to distinguished visitors to their court. Queens were personally involved in training weavers. The fabric was also a chief export of the Ahoms.

Although Silk was cultivated and woven by women all around Assam, the silk clothes of a particular place named Sualkuchi achieved much fame during the Kamarupa as well as Ahom rule. Sualkuchi is said to have been established in the 11th Century by King Dharma Pala of the Pala dynasty that ruled western Assam from 900 AD to about 1100 AD. Dharmapala, the story goes, brought 26 weaver families from Tantikuchi in Barpeta to Sualkuchi and created a weavers' village close to modern-day Guwahati. Silk was given royal patronage during that period and Sualkuchi was made an important centre of Silk weaving. The Hand-loom industry of Sualkuchi encompasses cotton textile, silk textile as well as Khadi cloth which are, in fact, traditional cloth endowing high social and moral value in and outside the state. However, Sualkuchi is well known for silk textiles both mulberry and muga silk. In fact muga, "the golden fibre" is produced only in Assam and it has also tremendous export potentiality. Such activities are intimately linked with the culture and tradition of the Assamese people since long past.

Muga silk was recognized as a protected geographical indication (GI) in 2007, and was granted a GI logo for trademark purposes in 2014. The logo has been registered with the Assam Science Technology and Environment Council. The Central Silk Board of India has been granted the authority to inspect muga silk products, certify their authenticity and allow producers to use the GI logo. This board is also involved in R&D and infrastructure development for Assamese silk, including muga, through the Central Muga Eri Research & Training Institute (CMER&TI) in Jorhat, Assam.

In 2015, Adarsh Gupta K of Nagaraju's research team at Centre for DNA Fingerprinting and Diagnostics, Hyderabad, India, discovered the complete sequence and the protein structure of muga silk fibroin and published it in Nature Scientific Reports.

India produced 158 tonnes of muga silk in FY 2014–15, out of which 136 tonnes were produced in Assam. India's total silk output in the same period amounted to 28,708 tonnes.

== See also ==
- Kausheya (silk)
