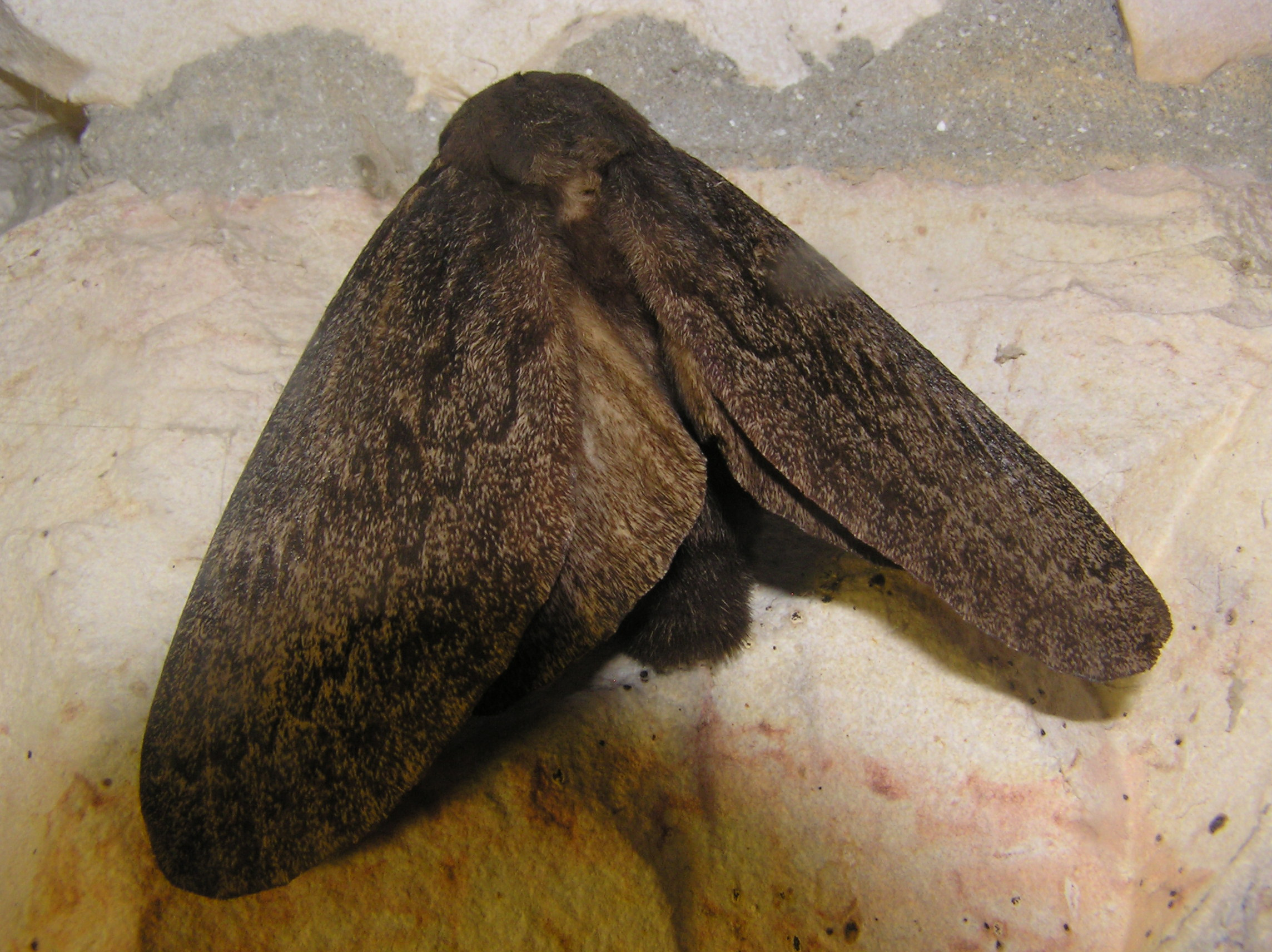

Scientific classification
- Kingdom: Animalia
- Phylum: Arthropoda
- Clade: Pancrustacea
- Class: Insecta
- Order: Lepidoptera
- Family: Lasiocampidae
- Genus: Pachypasa
- Species: P. otus

Binomial name
- Pachypasa otus (Drury, 1773)

Synonyms
- Sphinx otus Drury, 1773; Sphinx otus Drury, 1770

= Pachypasa otus =

Species of moth

Pachypasa otus is a moth of the family Lasiocampidae first described by Dru Drury in 1773. It is found in southern Europe (including Italy, the Balkans, and Greece), Asia Minor, Armenia, Iraq, Iran and Israel.

The wingspan is 36–45 mm. Adults are on the wing from June to September.

Recorded food plants include Cupressus, Juniperus, Thuja occidentalis and Quercus pubescens.

It was the probable source for Roman coa vestis, wild silk textiles from the isle of Kos.

== Sources ==
- P.C.-Rougeot, P. Viette (1978). Guide des papillons nocturnes d'Europe et d'Afrique du Nord. Delachaux et Niestlé (Lausanne).
