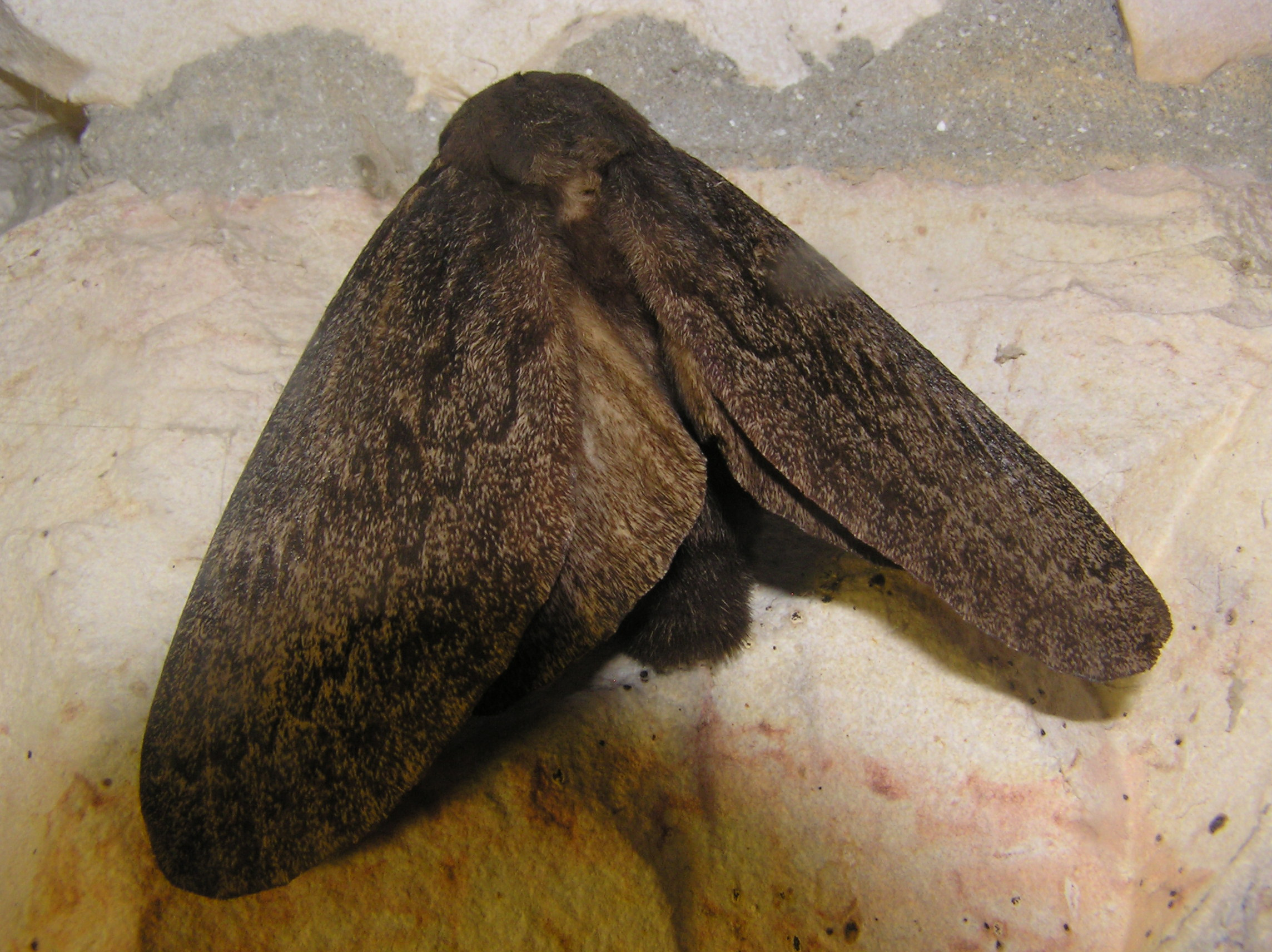
- Pachypasa otus

Scientific classification
- Kingdom: Animalia
- Phylum: Arthropoda
- Class: Insecta
- Order: Lepidoptera
- Family: Lasiocampidae
- Subfamily: Lasiocampinae
- Genus: Pachypasa; Walker, 1855

= Pachypasa =

Genus of moths

Pachypasa is a genus of moths in the family Lasiocampidae. The genus was erected by Francis Walker in 1855.

== Species ==
- Pachypasa otus (Drury, 1773) Italy, Greece, Asia Minor, Iraq, Iran
- Pachypasa limosa (de Villiers, 1827) southwestern Europe, northern Africa
- Pachypasa denticula (Bethune-Baker, 1908) Zimbabwe
- Pachypasa drucei (Bethune-Baker, 1908) Zimbabwe
- Pachypasa argibasis (Mabille, 1893) western and eastern Africa
- Pachypasa pallens (Bethune-Baker, 1908) Zimbabwe
- Pachypasa subfascia Walker, 1855 western Africa
- Pachypasa multipunctata (Hering, 1932)
