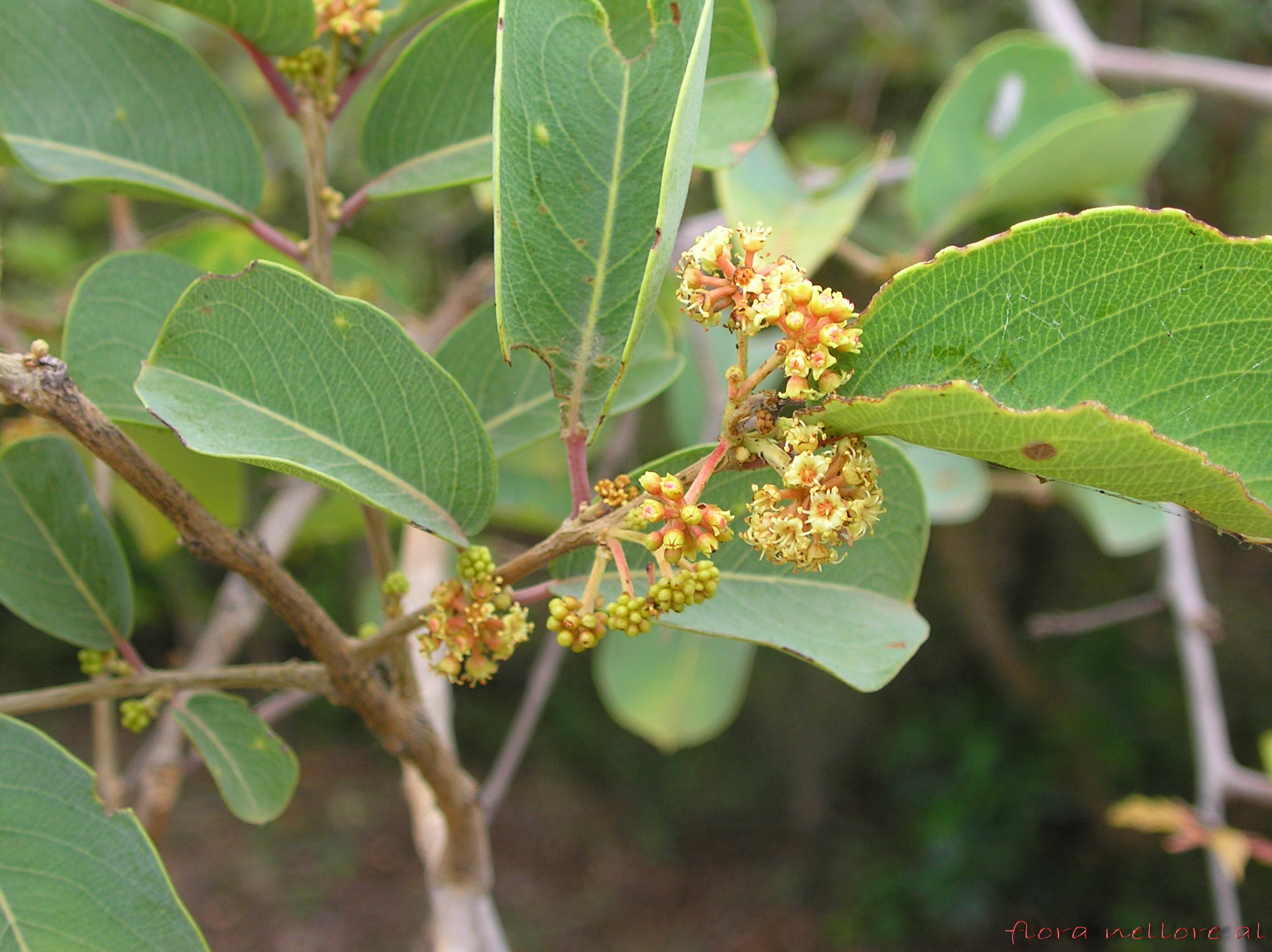

Scientific classification
- Kingdom: Plantae
- Clade: Tracheophytes
- Clade: Angiosperms
- Clade: Eudicots
- Clade: Rosids
- Order: Myrtales
- Family: Combretaceae
- Genus: Terminalia
- Species: T. anogeissiana

Binomial name
- Terminalia anogeissiana Gere & Boatwr.

Synonyms
- Anogeissus latifolia (Roxb. ex DC.) Wall. ex Guill. & Perr.; Conocarpus latifolius Roxb. ex DC

= Terminalia anogeissiana =

Species of flowering plant

Terminalia anogeissiana is a species of small to medium-sized trees native to the Indian subcontinent only. Its common names are axlewood (English), bakli, baajhi, dhau, dhawa, dhawra, dhawda, or dhaora (Hindi).

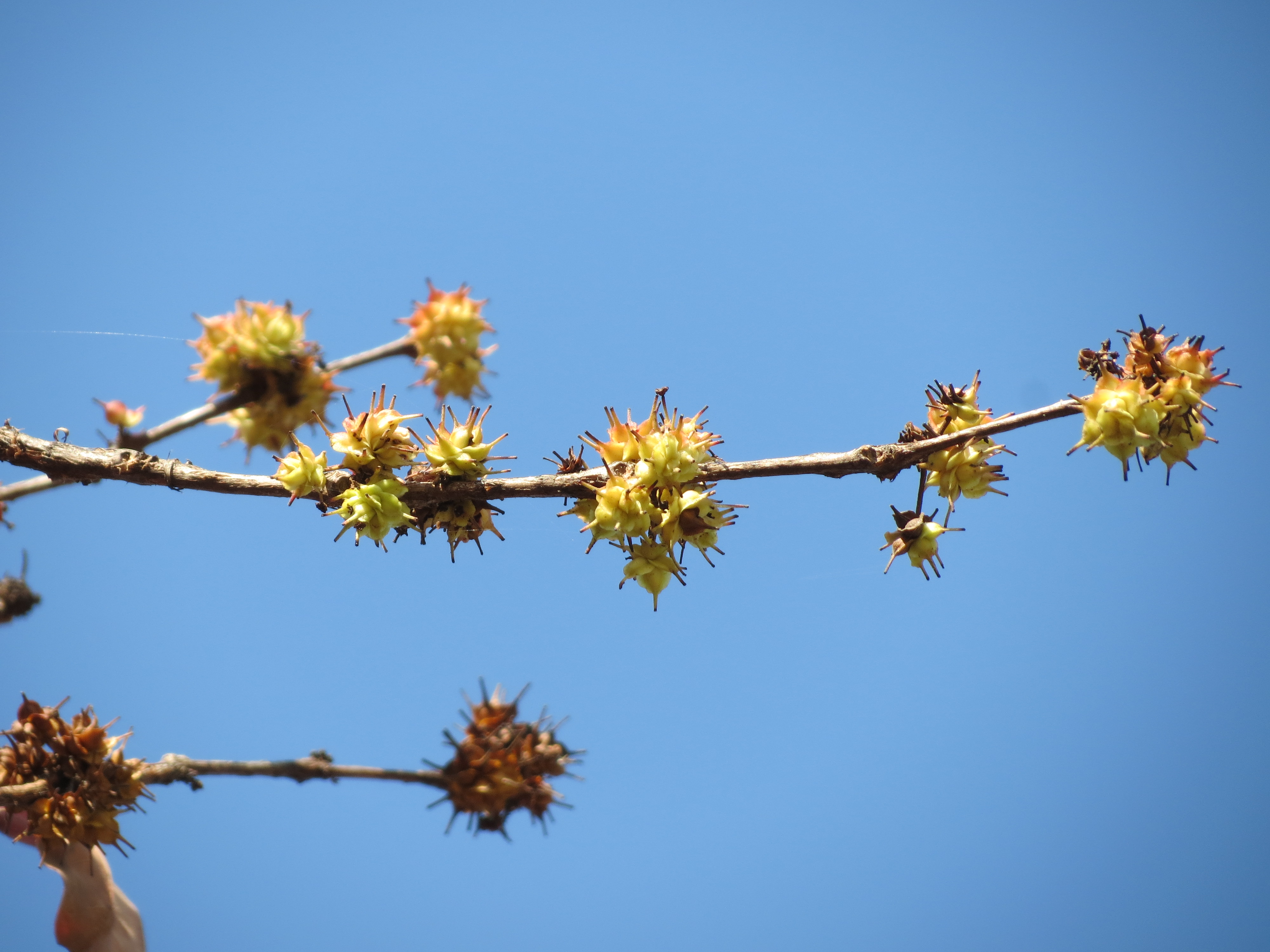
Fruit of Anogeissus latifolia

It is one of the most useful trees in India. Its leaves contain large amounts of gallotannins, and are used in India for tanning and firewood. The tree is the source of Indian gum, also known as ghatti gum, which is used for calico printing among other uses. The leaves are also fed on by the Antheraea paphia moth which produces the tassar silk (Tussah), a form of wild silk of commercial importance.

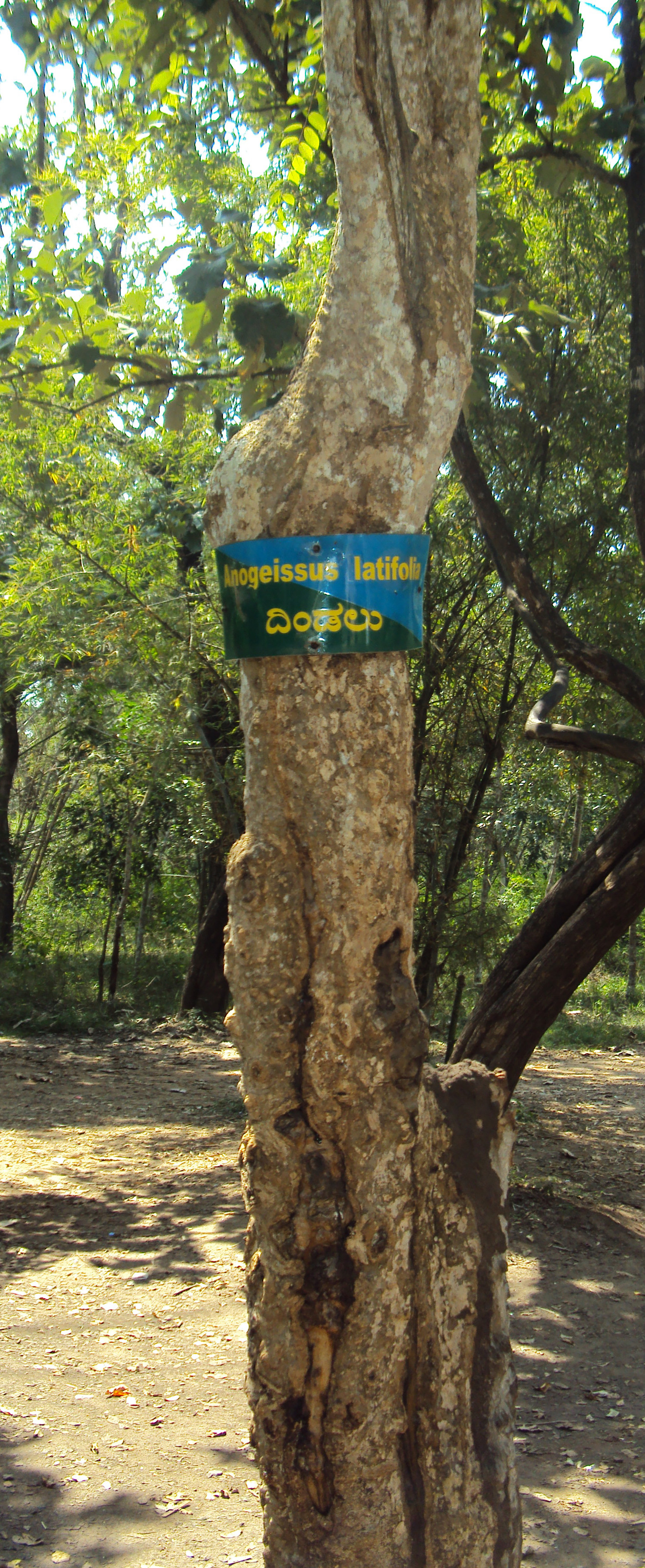
Bark of Anogeissus latifolia
