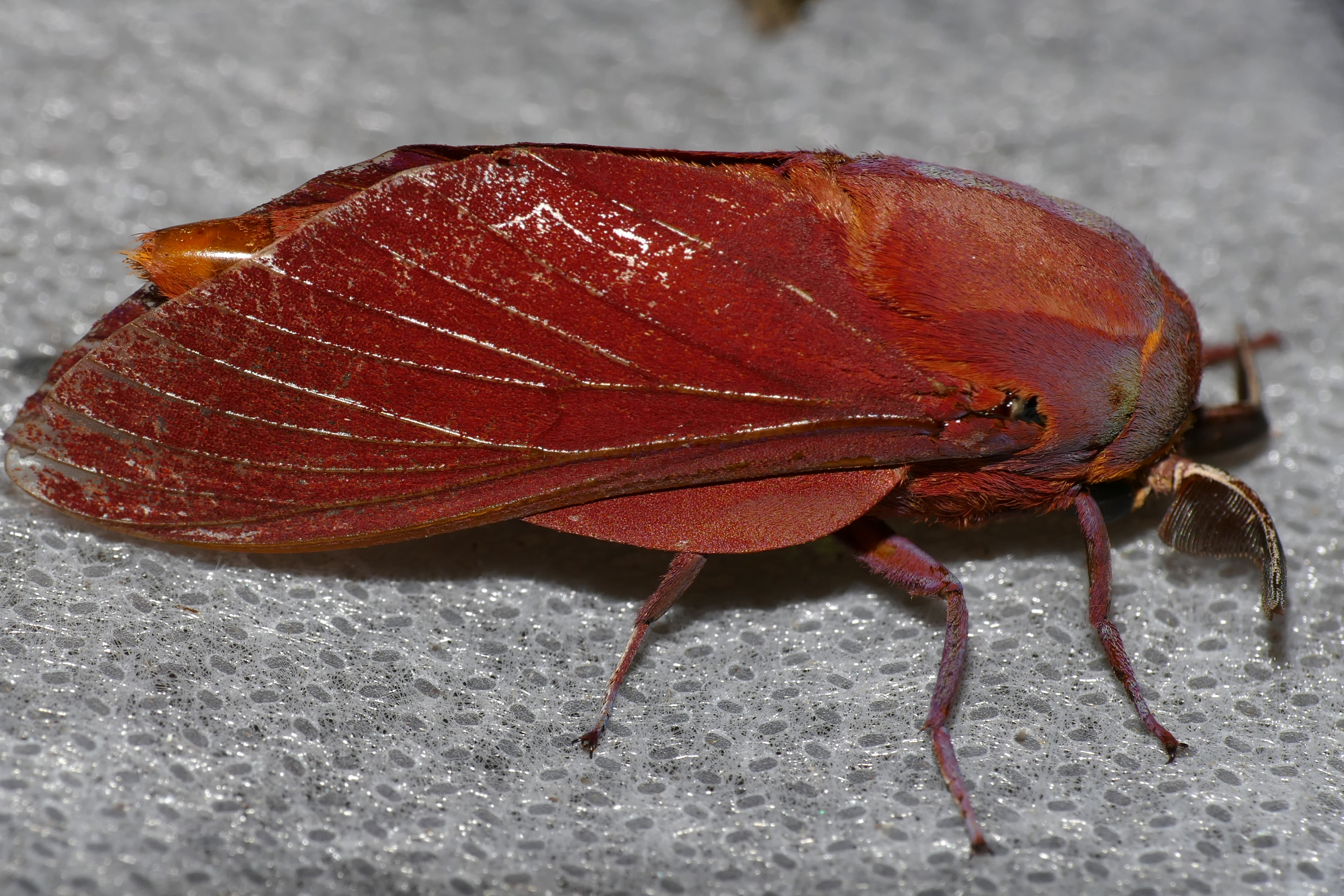
- Gonometa rufobrunnea

Scientific classification
- Kingdom: Animalia
- Phylum: Arthropoda
- Class: Insecta
- Order: Lepidoptera
- Family: Lasiocampidae
- Subfamily: Lasiocampinae
- Genus: Gonometa; Walker, 1855

Synonyms
- Caphara Walker, 1862

= Gonometa =

Genus of moths

Gonometa is a genus of moths in the family Lasiocampidae. The genus was erected by Francis Walker in 1855.

== Species ==
- Gonometa attenuata (Kenrick, 1914)
- Gonometa badia (Aurivillius, 1927)
- Gonometa bicolor (Dewitz, 1881)
- Gonometa cassndra Druce, 1887
- Gonometa christyi (Sharpe, 1902)
- Gonometa effusa
- Gonometa fulvida (Distant, 1897)
- Gonometa griseocincta (Hampson, 1910)
- Gonometa imperialis (Aurivillius, 1915)
- Gonometa marginata
- Gonometa negrottoi (Berio, 1940)
- Gonometa nysa (Druce, 1887)
- Gonometa podocarpi (Aurivillius, 1925)
- Gonometa postica (Walker, 1855)
- Gonometa regia (Aurivillius, 1905)
- Gonometa robusta (Aurivillius, 1909)
- Gonometa rufobrunnea (Aurivillius, 1922)
- Gonometa sjostedti (Aurivillius, 1892)
- Gonometa stalii
- Gonometa tessmanni
- Gonometa titan (Holland, 1893)
