= Kausheya =

Wild-silk variety from India

Kausheya (kauseya, Kiau-she-ye, Kaushika) was a wild variety of ancient silk from India. Domesticated and undomesticated silk (also known as wild silk) were produced in both India and China. Silk weaving is mentioned in Indian texts from the 3rd century BC. In the 4th century BC, Kātyāyana, an ancient grammarian, defined kausheva specifically as vikar, a product of kos (vikara koshdvam), — in other words, silk fabric. Shatapatha Brahmana refers to kusa, a variety of silk obtained from a silkworm called kuswari or kuswara. These silkworms are raised on jujube trees.

Kitsutram, kriminag, pattasutra, or pattron were names possibly referring to varieties of wild silk produced by various undomesticated silkworms reared on different trees, hence producing different qualities and colours of silk.

== Etymology ==
Kaushika or kausheya is a Sanskrit word that literally translates as silk. It is derived from "kosh", which means "cocoon of a silkworm". The derivation of the word is given by the ancient Sanskrit grammarian Pāṇini.

== Mention ==
Kausheya is described in a number of literary works, including the Indian Sanskrit epics Ramayana, Mahabharata, and Manusmriti. The Hindu goddess Sita is referred to as "Kausheya vasini," which translates as "one who wears silk garments". Sabha Parva (51.26) refers to kausheya in the Mahabharata, relating to an incident with Yudhishthira. The Sanskrit anthology of Buddhist avadana tales, Divyavadana (the fourth-century collection of Buddhist tales), also proves the existence of kausheya; it contains words such as kausheya, dhautapatta, kashikanshuka, kashi, pattanshuka, and chinashuka.

Kosh and kausheva are mentioned in several Sanskrit texts, including the Shatapatha Brahmana, Shushruta Samhitas, Kautilya's Arthash, Vashistha Dharmasutra (11,66), Vishnu Dharmasutra (44,26), Pāṇini's Sutrapat and Gunapat, Vaikhanas Dharmasutra (3,4,2 Pravar Khand).

Amarakosha also infers about a variety of kausheya that was patrorna. It is defined as "a bleached or white Kausheya."

Xuanzang who was also known as Hiuen-Tsang, a Chinese traveler from the 7th century, referred to Indian silk as "wild silk," implying that it was inferior to Chinese silk. He described kausheya while discussing contemporary people's clothing styles and materials. Hiuen-Tsang explained an unstitched garb for both men and women.

== Significance and use ==
Kshauma and kausheya were considered pure in Hinduism and were also permitted on Buddhist clothing. An ancient Sanskrit text on medicine and surgery, the Sushruta Samhita, categorises kausheya under the "articles of bandaging."

== See also ==
- Chinas, people mentioned in ancient Indian literature from the first millennium BC, such as the Mahabharata, Laws of Manu, as well the Puranic literature.
- Samia cynthia, breed of a moth which is not domesticated.
- Dukula, an ancient Indian cloth made from the bark of trees.
