= Demineralizing (silk worm cocoon) =

Demineralizing has the potential to be used in the silk sector enabling wet reeling of Wild Silk moth cocoons by removing the mineral layer present in these cocoons. This technique is not like degumming where the gum of the fibroin fibres is removed what would lead to a tangled cocoon. With "demineralizing" the gum and structure of the cocoon is kept intact enabling the cocoons to be wet reeled. This could allow a new silk industry in areas which have not the conditions or infrastructure for raising the domesticated silk worm Bombyx mori, possibly generating a revolutionary new income stream.

== Standard demineralizing solution ==
An aqueous 1 M solution of ethylenediaminetetraacetic acid (EDTA) is used adjusted to pH 10 with saturated sodium hydroxide solution. The cocoons are immersed in this solution for 72 h at 40 °C and gently stirred. During the process, the cocoons are kept under the surface of the solution by means of a plastic mesh, using a partial vacuum to encourage penetration of the solution. Afterwards, the cocoons are thoroughly washed with running tap water (three times 3 h) and subsequently reeled in tap water at room temperature using the standard method for Bombyx mori. The method described here forms the basis of a patent application.

== Other solutions useful for demineralizing ==
Citric acid (present in lemon juice, orange juice, pineapple juice), formic acid, aluminum nitrate, and phosphate ions are all known to remove calcium oxalate by chelating calcium ions or by directly dissolving it.
