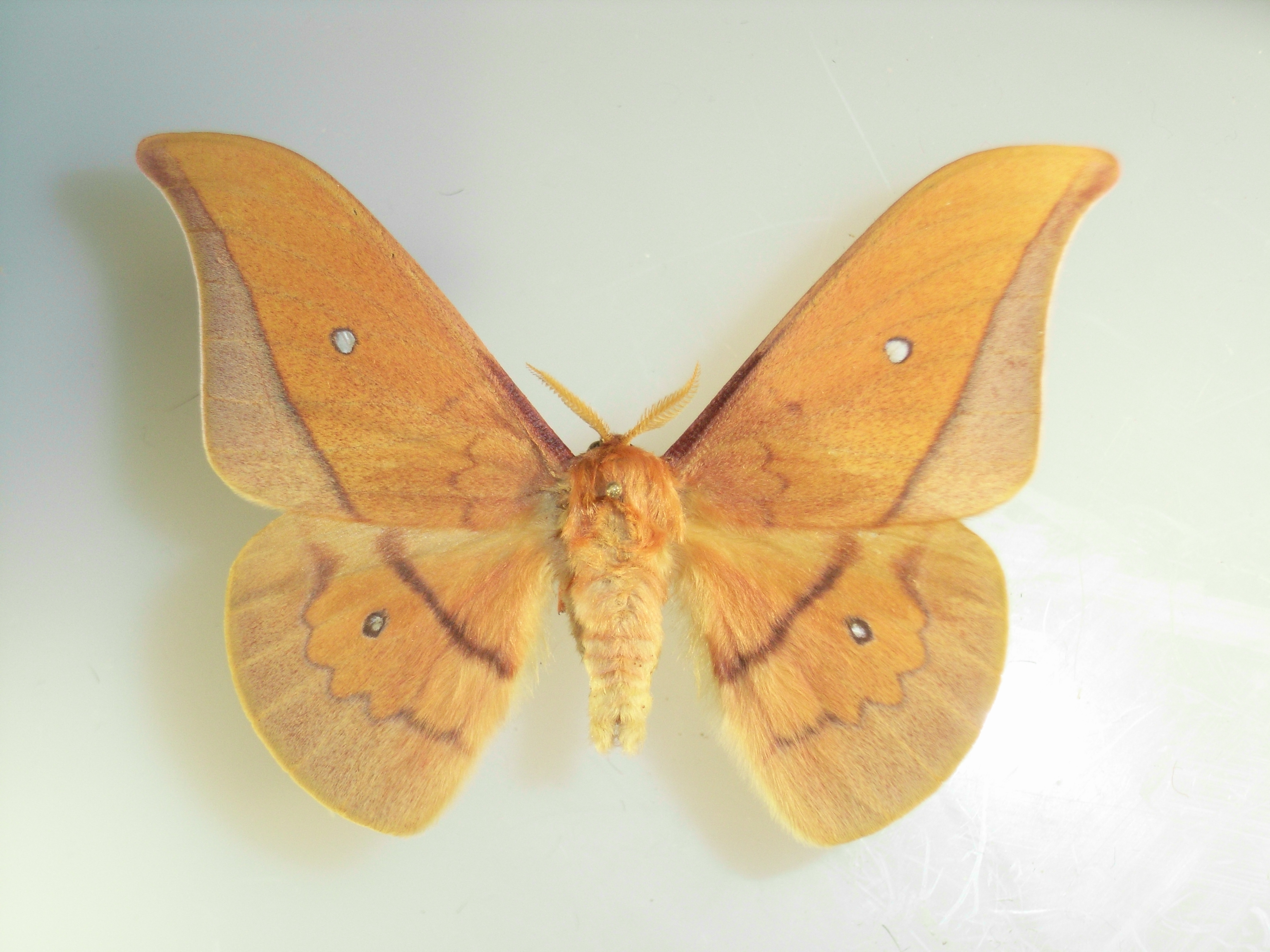
- Male

Scientific classification
- Kingdom: Animalia
- Phylum: Arthropoda
- Clade: Pancrustacea
- Class: Insecta
- Order: Lepidoptera
- Family: Saturniidae
- Genus: Cricula
- Species: C. trifenestrata

Binomial name
- Cricula trifenestrata Helfer, 1837

Synonyms
- Saturnia trifenestrata Helfer, 1837; Cricula andrei Holloway, 1976

= Cricula trifenestrata =

Cricula silkmoth

Species of moth

Cricula trifenestrata, the cricula silkmoth, is a species of wild silk moth of the family Saturniidae. It is found from India to the Philippines, Sulawesi, Java, and Sri Lanka.

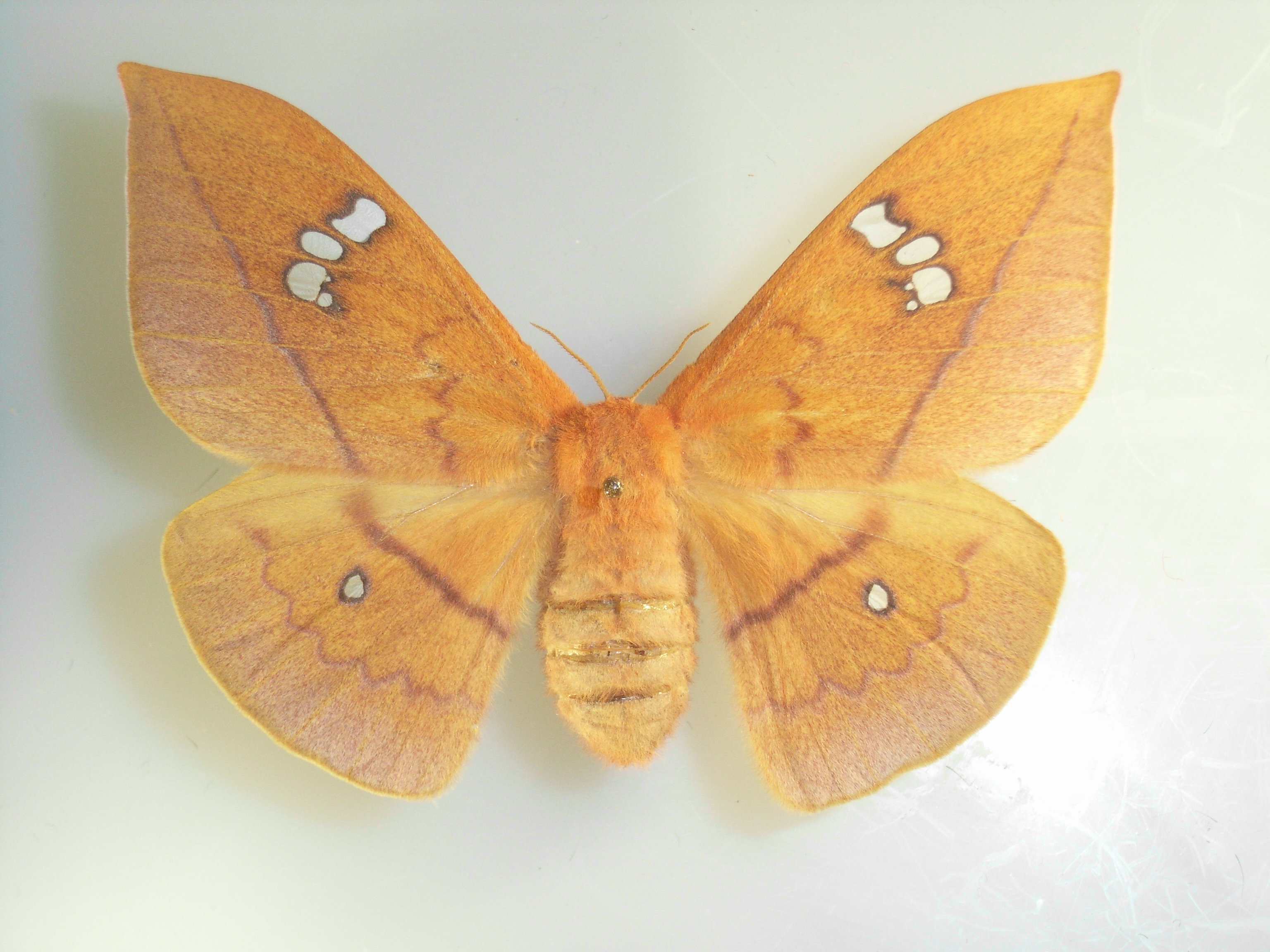
Female

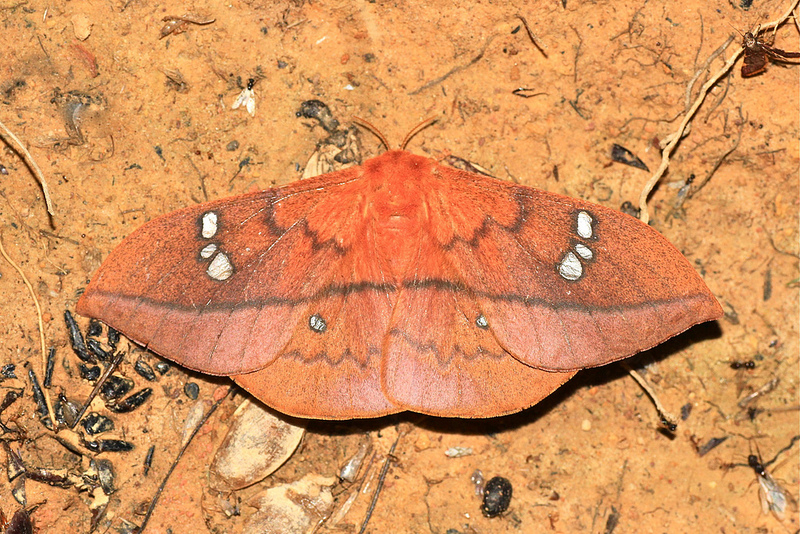
Female from Borneo

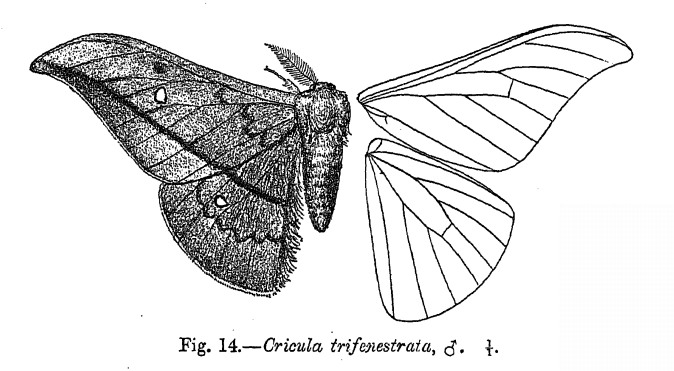
Upperside and wing venation

== Description ==
The wingspan is 65–100 mm. Adults are on wing from May to June with a possible second brood from August to September. Male is brown, ochreous, yellowish to reddish. Forewings are consisted with a waved anti-medial dark line and a small hyaline spot beyond the end of the cell, with one or two others above it. The upper one is a dark spot. Hindwings with oblique line continued to the inner margin before the middle. There is a hyaline spot beyond the cell. Ventral side is much purple.

Female is red. There are three large irregularly shaped hyaline spots beyond the cell of the forewing, often with one or two small sides inside them.

Larva is blackish brown with red spots in color and hairy. There are six setiferous tubercles in each somite from 2nd to 11th. First somite and anal claspers are crimson colored. Legs and prolegs are brown colored.

The larvae have been recorded on Anacardium, Mangifera, Spondias, Careya, Bischofia, Canarium, Quercus, Cinnamomum, Machilus, Persea, Acrocarpus, Ziziphus, Malus, Prunus, Pyrus, Salix and Schleichera species.

Pupa

At this phase, a tube that releases golden silk fibres replaces the mouth as they do not eat. After passing the last frass, each pupa will begin to spin golden cocoon between one or several leaves. Cocoon composed of bright golden yellow silk firmly united into a network. The female spins larger cocoon than the male to accommodate its larger size. The golden cocoon is usually completed in about 8 hours. This incubation phase normally lasts for 21 – 26 days. However, during radical climate condition, it may last for 2 – 3 months.

== Distribution ==
=== Javanese population ===
On the island of Java, Cricula silk moths are usually seen on wing around August, with a possible second brood from January to February. Unlike the domesticated Bombyx Mori silkworm which feeds solely on mulberry leaves, the Cricula is a polyphagous. This means that it is capable of feeding on a variety of host plants. In Java, Cricula feeds on the leaves of cashew, soursop, avocado, mahogany; with a keen preference towards cashew leaves.

With technology collaboration with Japan, the naturally golden cocoons have been successfully utilised into wild silk yarns and other crafts, creating a source of income for the local villagers. In 2019, the utilisation of Cricula golden cocoons have been recognised by the United Nation as a sustainable practice, inline with UNSDG2030.

== Utilisations ==
=== Introduction ===
Since 1990s to present day, the cocoons of the wild silk moth: Cricula trifenestrata are utilised for the production of wild silk yarns. This practice has also brought a long run impact on afforestation as an initiative to preserve the moth's natural habitat by active tree planting.

=== Objective of the practice ===
Batik is a World Intangible Cultural Heritage, but the fabric used to create this textile art such as silk was too expensive for the low-income batik artists as they were mostly imported from overseas. Hence, endangering the art of Batik making as fewer people in the region can afford to create this art. They are abundantly found in specific-regions in Indonesia. However, in Indonesia, the larvae were subjected to control as agricultural pests. When viewed from a different perspective and by applying suitable technology and knowledge, pests can be transformed into a sustainable beneficial material that occur in large quantities. In this good practice, applicable Japanese biodiversity knowledge and collaboration with the Kimono market has significantly proven to improve the profitability of low-income earners, with an impact of greening the devastated 60 hectare land that belongs to the Royal Family of Jogjakarta.

=== Implementation of the Project ===
The Royal Silk Foundation (initiated and founded by the Royal Family of Yogyakarta) has continuously created seminars to educate the villagers on how to turn the Cricula's cocoon into wild silk yarns and other handicrafts. This creates jobs and income for the local villagers as the yarns are exported to Japan to be used to create high value, Kimono and Obis. The business partners who purchase the wild silk yarns helped restore the Cricula's natural habitat by planting cashews, avocados etc. Tree planting tours are also actively conducted.

Habitat coordinates: -7.9348431914577935, 110.40235126180919

=== Impacts ===
Today the Royal Hill is a green sanctuary and home to the Cricula trifenestrata. Farmers understand that pests can be beneficial insects by changing their perspectives. The village has evolved into a sustainable village, with higher income and creativity in utilizing their local resources. The village is now popular as a cashew nuts and chips producer. There are inspection trip from overseas about the efforts of this successful project. There is a request from overseas for cooperation on this initiative.

However, today, more than 30 years later, Cricula trifenestrata is still labelled as pest in Indonesia and the rest of the world.

Recognition within the United Nations system

The initiative has been acknowledged in several UN-affiliated frameworks for its contribution to sustainable development and biodiversity-based livelihoods:

- Featured among the UN SDG Good Practices (2nd Call, 2019) — #SDGAction30981
- Listed under the UN SDG Acceleration Actions (2022) — #SDGAction48294
- Included in the UN Water Action Network (2023) — #SDGAction49210
- Highlighted in the UN Conscious Fashion and Lifestyle Network (2023) — #SDGAction49141
- Selected for the UN SDG Summit Acceleration Actions (2023) — #SDGAction53224
- Presented as a science–policy brief at the United Nations STI Forum (2024)
- Featured in the FAO Biotechnology Conference 2025, within the bioeconomy sector.
