= Eri silk =

Silk from the cocoons of Samia ricini silkworms

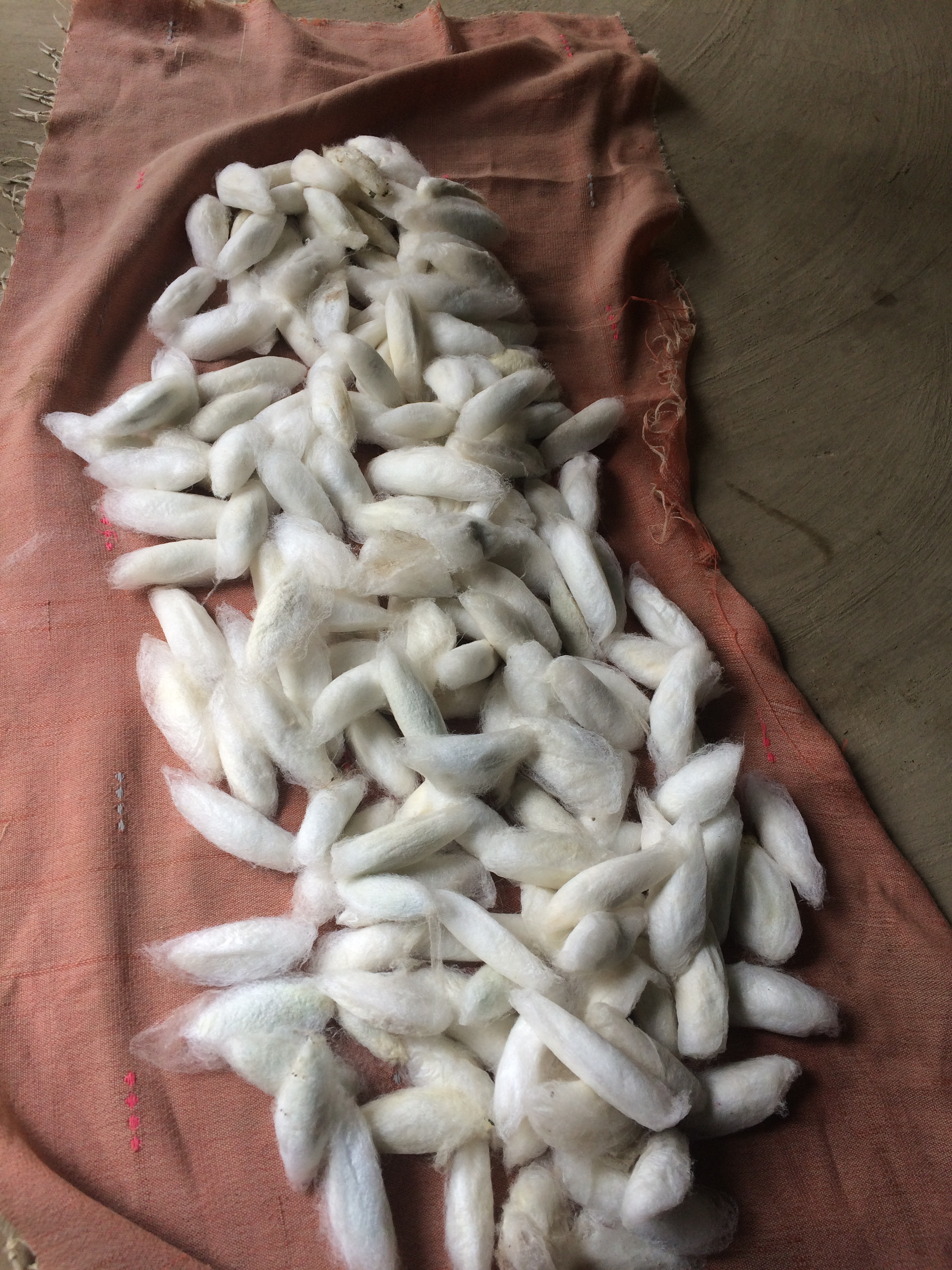
Eri cocoons

Eri silk is a type of peace silk produced by the domesticated silkworm Samia ricini. It is primarily produced in the northeastern Indian states of Assam, Nagaland and Meghalaya, but it is also found in Bihar, Odisha, West Bengal and Andhra Pradesh on a smaller scale. It was imported to Thailand in 1974.

Eri is derived from the Assamese word "era," which refers to castor, a plant on which the Eri silkworms feed. The silk is produced by worms that consume the leaves of the castor oil plant (Ricinus communis).

Silk cocoons are generally boiled to kill the unhatched worm still inside to preserve the continuity of the silk fibers; Eri silk cocoons are open at one end, allowing the moth to leave before the cocoon is processed. This unique characteristic of Eri silk means it can be harvested without killing the silkworm, making it a more ethical alternative to other types of silk. Thus, the woolly white silk is often referred to as the fabric of peace when it is processed without killing the silkworm. This process results in a silk called Ahimsa silk. Moths leave the cocoon and then the cocoons are harvested to be spun. The eri silkworm is the only completely domesticated silkworm other than Bombyx mori. The silk is characterized by its soft texture and natural colors, which range from white to faint gold, with some variations appearing in rust-red. One of the unique features of Eri silk is its heavier and darker nature compared to other silks such as Mulberry or Tussar.

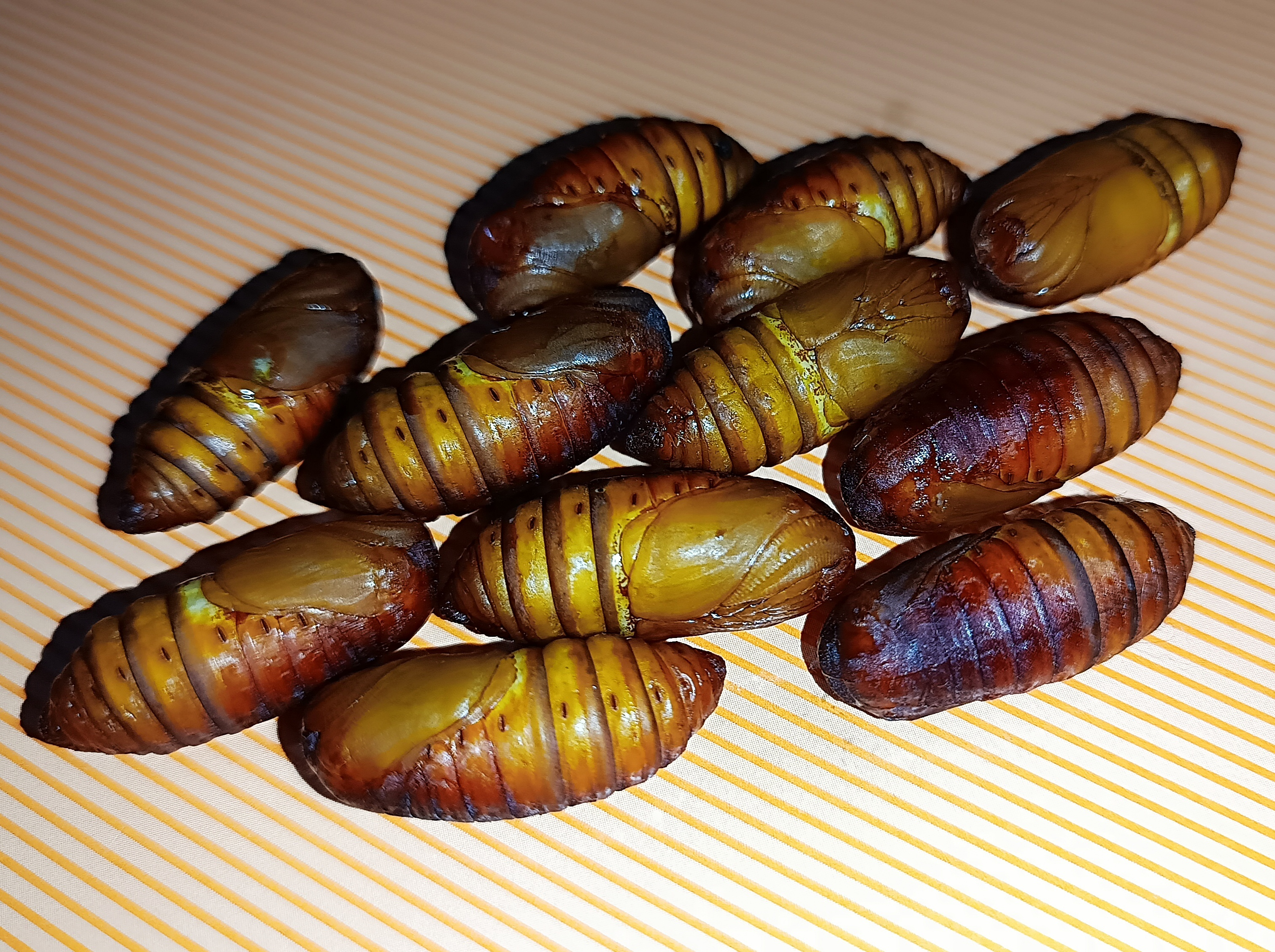
Pupa of Eri silkworm

== Process ==
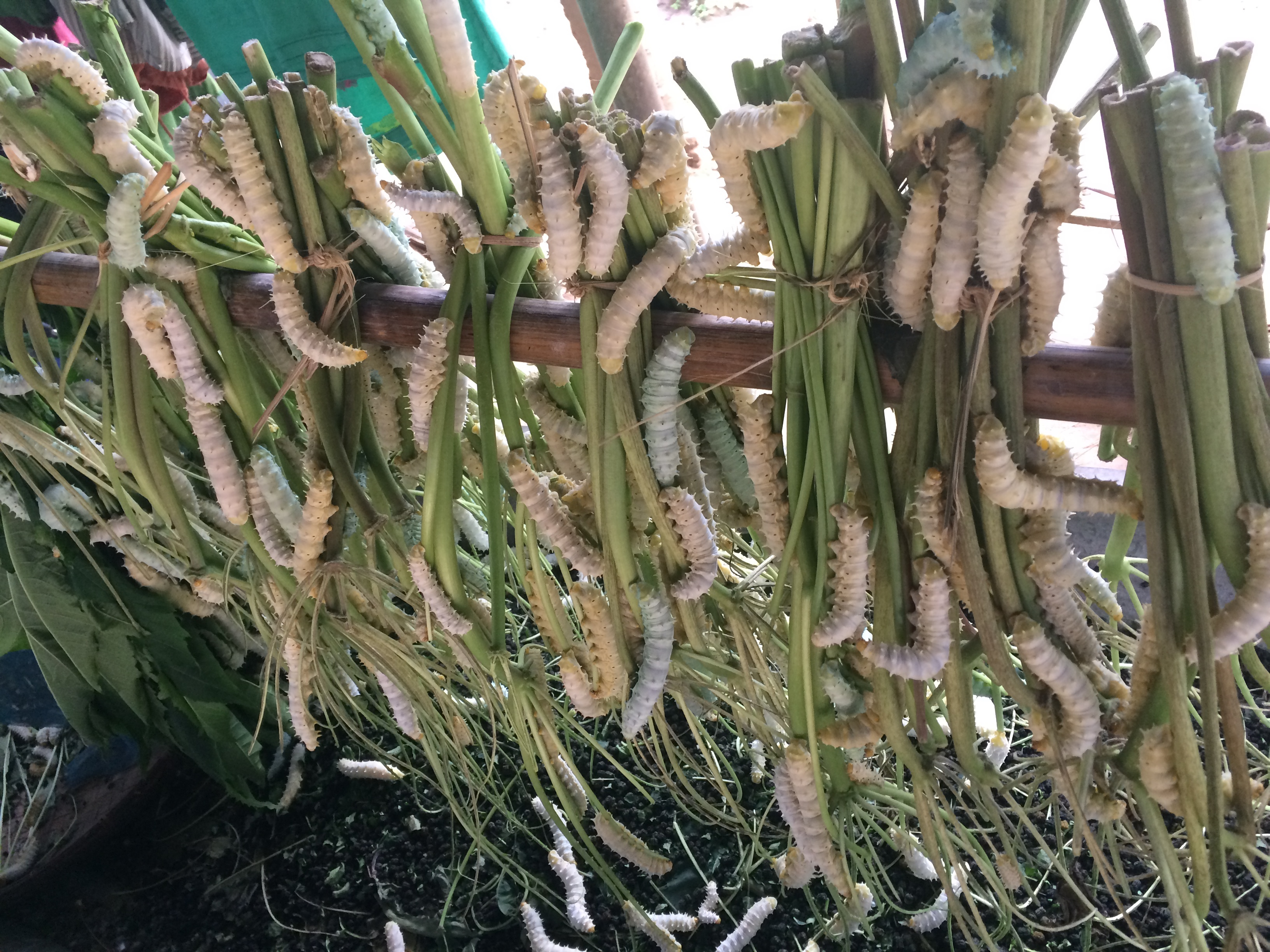
Rearing of eri silk worm

Eri caterpillars eat a number of plants, including Kesseru. In India, it is grown in the states of Meghalaya, Assam, Nagaland, Manipur, Arunachal Pradesh, Bihar, Jharkhand, Chhattisgarh, Odisha, Karnataka, Andhra Pradesh and some small cities in other states. It has been grown in 28 provinces of Thailand since 1974 where the heavy rainfall and humid atmosphere of the region suits the eri culture. The spun threads are often more "cottony" than most Bombyx silks, although some eri yarns can be very soft and shiny. After 30–32 days, the silkworm crawls in search of a comfortable place among the leaves to spin its cocoon.

In Thailand, eri silkworms are fed cassava leaves as well as castor leaves.

== Qualities ==
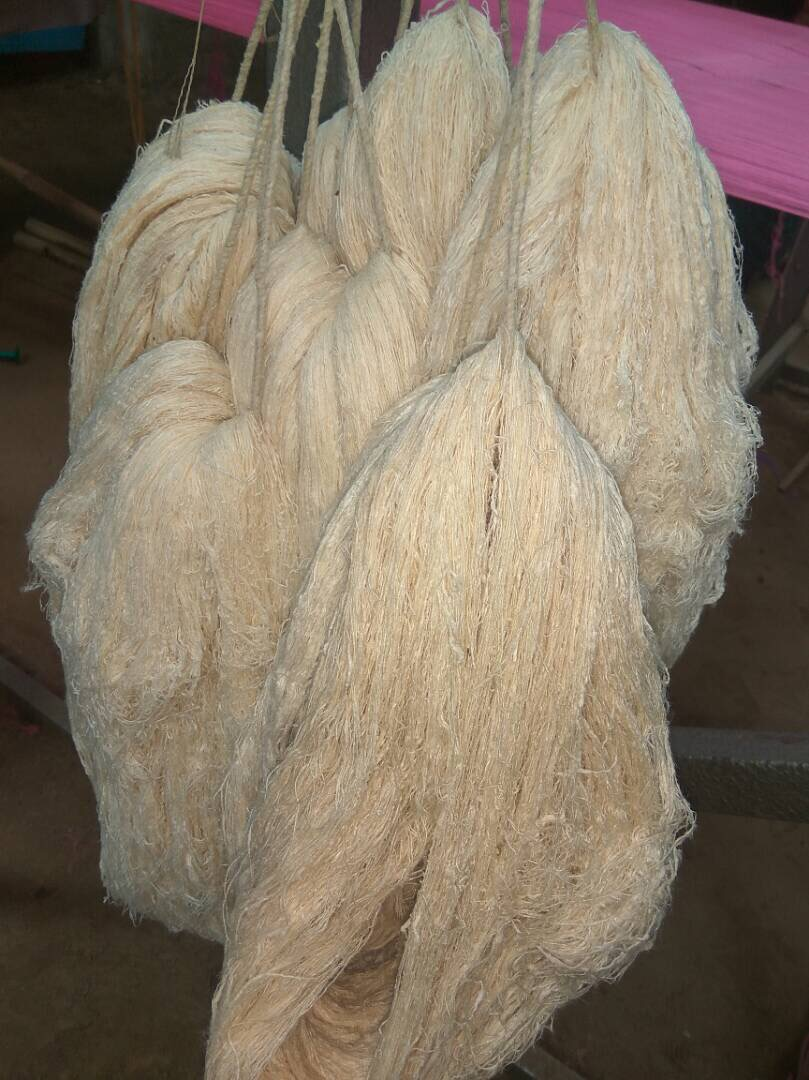
Eri fiber

Eri silk is a staple fiber, unlike other silks, which are continuous filament. The texture of the fabric is coarse, fine, and dense. It is strong, durable, and elastic, and is darker and heavier than other silks.

== Uses of eri silk fabric ==
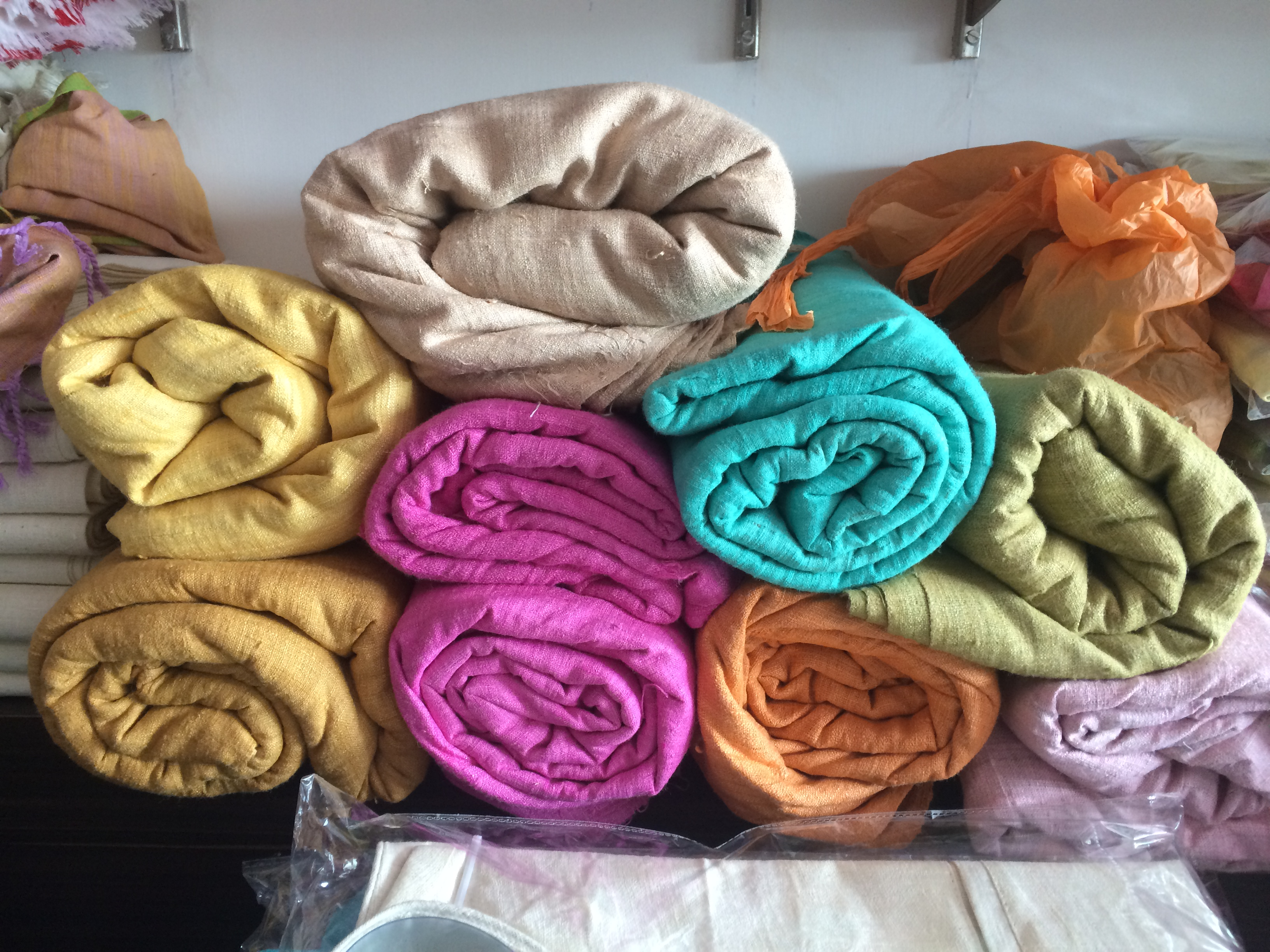
Eri silk clothes

Eri silk production in India during 2007–2008 was 1,530 tons. This made up 73 percent of the total wild silk production of 2,075 tons.

Vegan designer Lucy Tammam used eri silk in her couture evening and bridal wear collections.

== See also ==
- Meghalaya
- Sericulture
- Assam silk
- Agriculture in Thailand
