= Johann Wilhelm Helfer =

Johann Wilhelm Helfer also known as Jan Vilém Helfer (February 5, 1810 in Prague – January 30, 1840 in Andaman Islands) was a Bohemian physician, explorer and naturalist. He died in the Andaman Islands, after the group he was in was attacked by natives with arrows. Many of the plants he collected went to Kew and nearly 140 species were named after him.

== Life ==
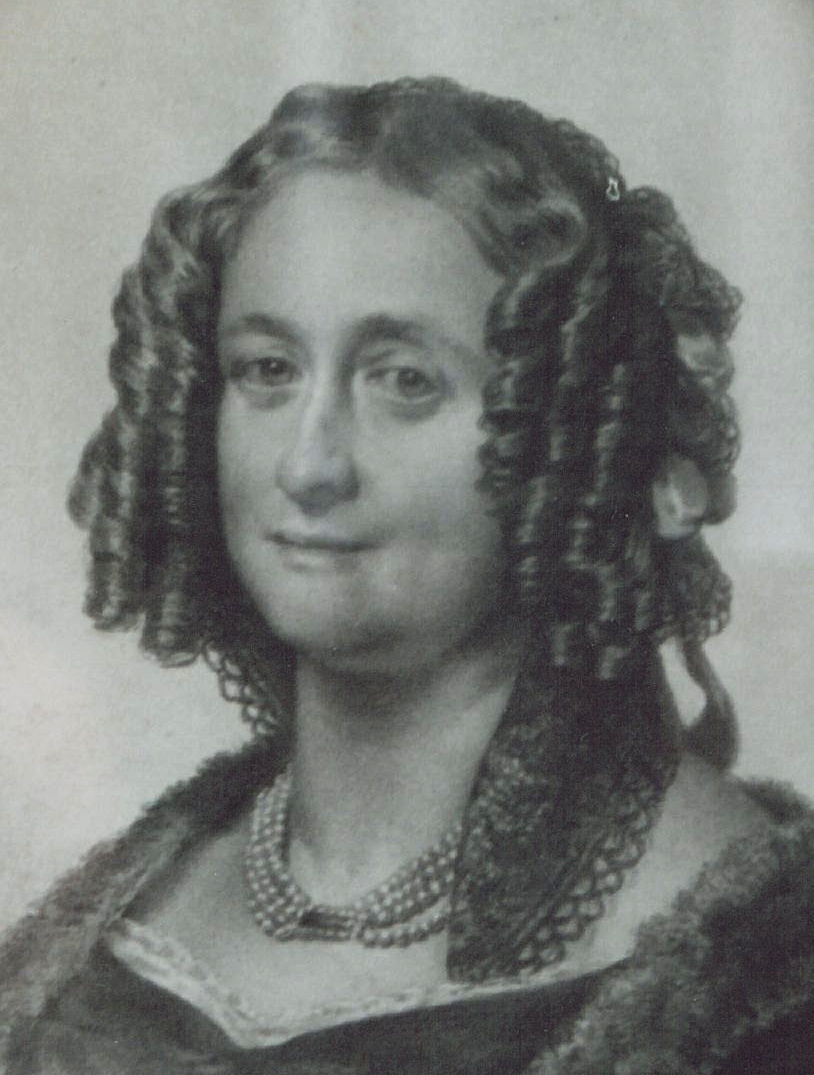
Madame Helfer, née Baroness des Granges, in 2nd marriage Countess von Nostitz, see Ainsworth, 1888, p. 47 ff

Helfer came from a wealthy bourgeoisie family from Prague. He first attended the Prague grammar school and then began studying medicine. He studied at the universities of Prague, Vienna, Padua and Trieste. In 1832 he was appointed Dr. Ing. med. doctorate. On a subsequent trip to Italy he met and married Mathilde Pauline Baroness des Granges (c. 1801– 9 July 1881), the daughter of Carl Ludwig Philipp Baron des Granges and his wife, Baroness Sophie Juliane Wilhelmine von Bülow. Her paternal grandfather was Philipp Ludwig Siegmund Bouton des Granges (1731–1801), a highly celebrated Prussian Major General of Swiss-Huguenot origin who achieved military fame under Frederick the Great. The couple decided to travel from Trieste through the Middle East towards India. Their first natural history collections were made near Smyrna where Helfer practised medicine. They continued to Aleppo. In Aleppo, Helfer was invited to join Colonel Francis Rawdon Chesney's Euphrates expedition as the expedition's naturalist. The expedition began the journey down the Euphrates on 22 March 1836. The Euphrates expedition continued, but the Helfers left it at Balis in May, after sending two crates of specimens to the British Museum (lost at sea). Parting from Chesney the Helfers traveled from Syria to the Persian Gulf to begin the six-week voyage to Calcutta. They stopped in Baghdad and Bushehr, and then in Muscat (Oman), arriving in Calcutta on 20 August 1836 where they stayed with acquaintances of Chesney and later at the Chowringhee Boarding House. Helfer collected plants and lectured on natural history to the Asiatic Society of Bengal. John Clark Marshman (1794–1877), editor of the weekly newspaper Friend of India encouraged the East India Company which had founded the botanic garden in Calcutta in 1787 to employ Helfer as a naturalist. During this time, he kept in contact with the German geographer Carl Ritter, who used the information provided by helpers for his volumes 10 and 11 of his geography. Helfer explored the Tenasserim provinces and the Mergui Archipelago (now in Burma) on behalf of Company. The Helfers left Calcutta on 21 January 1837 aboard the Elizabeth and travelled down the River Hooghly and across the Bay of Bengal to Moulmein. From this base he wrote a series of detailed reports on his observations on mining and forestry. Sometime during 1837, the Helfers started a plantation near Myeik focusing on palm trees, coffee and nutmegs and in 1837 and 1838 he sailed the shores of India and Burma. On 30 January 1840 Helfer was struck by a native arrow during a last trip to the Andaman Islands. His body was never recovered. Several myths were propagated subsequently, including the idea that his wife killed the assassin. In fact, she was not even present with him on that trip. Following Helfer's death, his widow gave her husband's collections to the Bohemian Museum (55,249 natural history specimens, representing 47,833 beetles belonging to 1,700 species, 609 bird skins, 14 mammal skins, 508 Lepidoptera and 6,086 herbarium specimens or collections, representing at least 574 species). In 1844, Pauline Helfer married Count Joseph Dittmar von Nostitz-Rieneck-Rokitnitz (1794–1871). In 1873 and 1877, she published two volumes recounting their travels and adventures in the Middle East and Indo-Burma.

== Works ==
- Helfer, J. W., 1838 Report of the coal discovered in the Tenasserim provinces. Journal of the Asiatic Society of Bengal 7: 701–706.
- Helfer, J. W., 1838 Note on the animal productions of the Tenasserim provinces. Journal of the Asiatic Society of Bengal 7: 855–862.
- Helfer, J. W., 1839 Amherst town, in the Tenasserim provinces. The provinces of Ye, Tavoy and Mergue on the Tenasserim coast; visited and examined by order of government, with the view to develop their natural resources, Second report. Calcutta.
- Helfer, J. W., 1840 Third report on Tenasserim – the surrounding nations. Inhabitants, natives and foreigners – character, morals and religion. Calcutta.
- Helfer, J. W., 1840 Fourth report on the Tenasserim provinces, considered as a resort for Europeans. Calcutta.
- Helfer, J. W., 1859 Johann Wilhelm Helfer's gedruckte und ungedruckte Schriften über die Tenasserim Provinzen, den Mergui Archipel und die Andamanen-Inseln. Mittheilungen der kaiserlich-königlichen geographischen Gesellschaft 3.

== Collections ==
Zoology

His private collection from 1830 and his Euphrates expedition insect collections, and specimens from Asia minor, Iraq and the Persian Gulf and India, Burma (1836) and the Mergui Archipelago (1837/39) and from the Andamans (1840) are in the National Museum in Prague. The Buprestidae, Lucanidae, Cetoniidae and Cerambycidae are "lost" in the collections of Victor Motschulsky.

Botany

Kew Herbarium, Botanische Staatssammlung München, Central National Herbarium, Kolkata.Website

In 1937, the National Museum (Prague) edited an exsiccata-like series of plant specimens collected by J.W. Helfer under the title Reliquiae Helferianae e Sectione botanica Musei Nationalis Pragae editae anno 1937.
