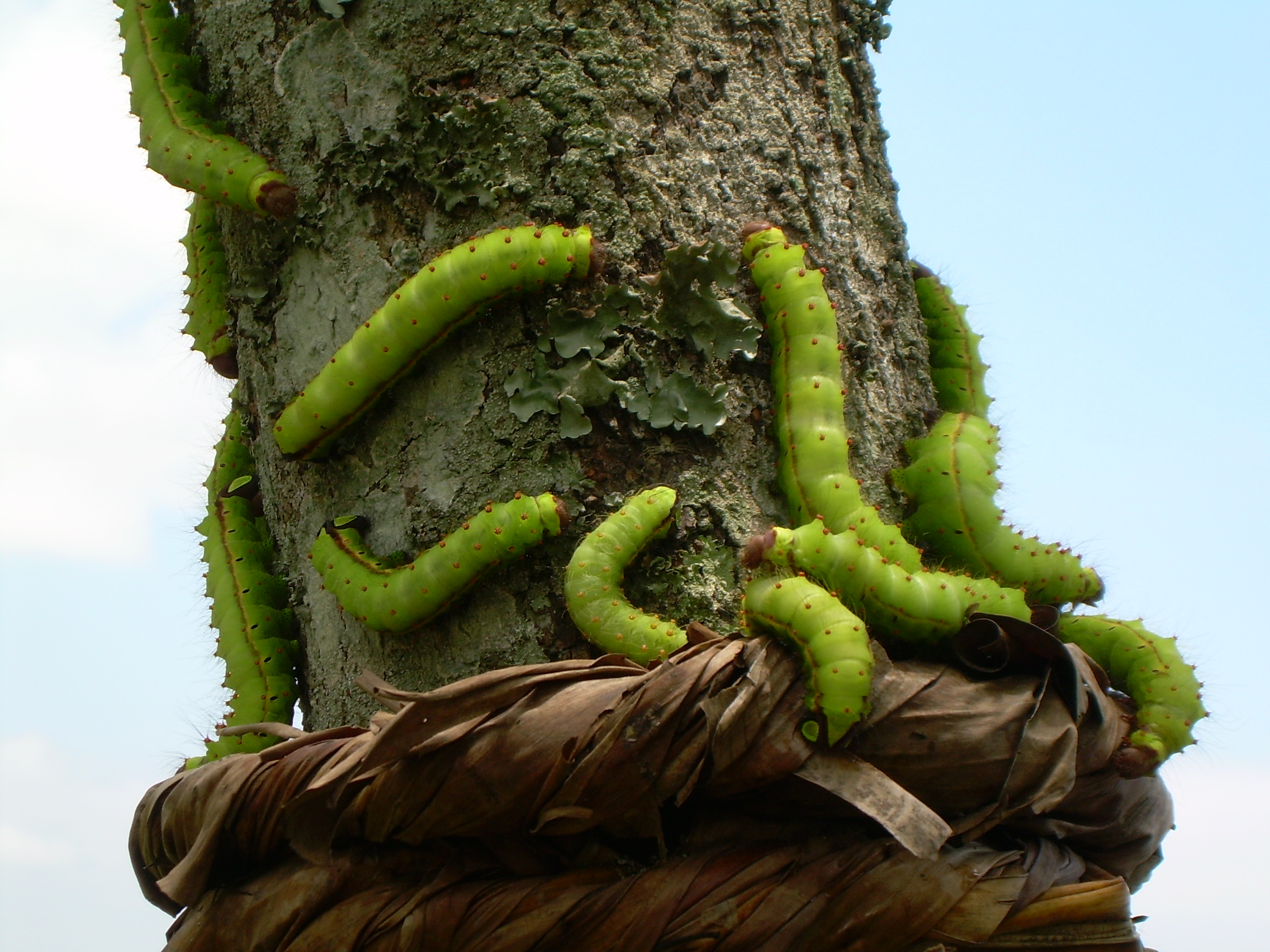
- Caterpillars

Scientific classification
- Kingdom: Animalia
- Phylum: Arthropoda
- Clade: Pancrustacea
- Class: Insecta
- Order: Lepidoptera
- Family: Saturniidae
- Genus: Antheraea
- Species: A. assamensis

Binomial name
- Antheraea assamensis Helfer, 1837

Synonyms
- Antheraea brunnea; Antheraea youngi; Antheraea perotteti; Saturnia assama; Antheraea assama; Antheraea mezankooria; Antheraea brunnea subvelata; Antheraea assamensis mezops; Antheraea assamensis rubigenea

= Antheraea assamensis =

- Adult

Species of moth

Antheraea assamensis, known as the muga silkworm as a larva and Assam silk moth as an adult, is a moth of the family Saturniidae. The species was first described by Johann Wilhelm Helfer in 1837. It is found in Assam in northeast India where 99% of its production occurs.

The larvae feed on Cinnamomum, Funastrum (including former Sarcostemma species), Laurus, Litsea, Carpinus, Persea, Magnolia, Michelia, Quercus and Symplocos.

Its silk, one of the varieties of tussar silk, has a glossy golden hue which improves with age and washing. It is never bleached or dyed and is stain resistant. It was reserved for the exclusive use of elites in Assam. Like other silk moths, the female has a larger abdomen and slender antennae when compared to males. The larvae are vibrantly coloured and are monophagous as other silk moths.

In 2015, Adarsh Gupta K of Nagaraju's research team at Centre for DNA Fingerprinting and Diagnostics, Hyderabad, India, discovered the complete sequence and the protein structure of muga silk fibroin and published it in Nature Scientific Reports.

In 2009, Utpal Bora and his team at the Indian Institute of Technology Guwahati in Assam reported the potential of using muga silk fibroin as a promising biomaterial for tissue engineering applications.

The disease known as pebrine is caused by Microsporidia (intercellular, fungal parasites), and affects Antheraea assamensis. This destructive disease obstructs the developmental processes of the Muga silkworm.

An article that was published in 2020 talks about a study that was conducted about the moths. The study was that aimed at the cocoons, which were to be collected from 11 different regions of North East Indian regions where they are found. Researchers looked at the weight and silk quality of these cocoons.
