= Sinchaw =

Type of Chinese silk imported in the US in the 1700s

Sinchaw, or Synchaw, was a silk type described in an early 19th century list of prices as “a firm thick even Kind of Goods”. Sinchaw was among the varieties of Chinese silk imported into the United States during the eighteenth century. The length of a piece was around 30 yards with a variance of one yard.
