= Journal of Genetics =

Peer-reviewed scientific journal

- Discipline: Genetics
- Language: English
- Edited by: H. A. Ranganath

Publication details
- History: 1910–1977, 1985–present
- Publisher: Indian Academy of Sciences and Springer Science+Business Media (India)
- Impact factor: 0.993 (2019)

Standard abbreviations
- ISO 4: J. Genet.

Indexing
- CODEN: JOGNAU
- ISSN: 0022-1333 (print); 0973-7731 (web)
- LCCN: sg16000022
- OCLC no.: 908997602

Links
- Journal homepage; Online archive; Journal page at Academy website

The Journal of Genetics is a peer-reviewed scientific journal in the field of evolution and genetics. It was established in 1910 by the British geneticists William Bateson and Reginald Punnett and is one of the oldest genetics journals. It was later edited by J.B.S. Haldane, who emigrated to India in 1957, and continued publishing the journal from there.

On Haldane's death in 1964, his second wife Helen Spurway continued to publish the journal with Madhav Gadgil, H. Sharat Chandra, and Suresh Jayakar as editors until Spurway died in 1977 and the journal ceased publication. With the permission of Naomi Mitchison, Haldane's sister, it was revived in 1985 and has been published by the Indian Academy of Sciences, currently in collaboration with Springer Science+Business Media, since then. All volumes published between 1910 and 1994 (vol. 1-73) are available free on the website of the Indian Academy of Sciences.

According to the Journal Citation Reports, the journal has a 2019 impact factor of 0.993.

It adopted the "Continuous Article Publication" (CAP) mode from January 2019.
