= Helen Spurway =

British biologist

- Born: June 12, 1915; Wandsworth, London, Great Britain
- Died: February 15, 1978 (aged 62); Hyderabad, India
- Citizenship: United Kingdom (former); India
- Education: Ph.D., University College London, 1938
- Known for: Genetics of fruit fly, guppy (parthenogenesis); Animal behavior, domestication
- Spouse: J. B. S. Haldane
- Scientific career
- Fields: biology
- Workplaces: University College London, Indian Statistical Institute, Genetics & Biometry Laboratory
- Doctoral advisor: J. B. S. Haldane
- Other academic advisors: J. B. S. Haldane
- Author abbrev. (zoology): Spurway, H.

Helen Spurway (12 June 1915 – 15 February 1978) was a British-Indian biologist and the second wife of J. B. S. Haldane; thus also sometimes known as Helen Spurway-Haldane. She emigrated to India in 1957 along with him, both taking up Indian citizenship in 1961, and conducted research in field biology with Krishna Dronamraju, Suresh Jayakar, and others.

== Life and career ==
Spurway was born in 1915 in the London borough of Wandsworth, the daughter of Frank Spurway and Kate Lea, who were employees of the Post Office, as a telegraphist and a telegraphist and postal clerk.

She obtained her Ph.D. in genetics in 1938 at University College London under the supervision of Haldane, whom she met as an undergraduate and married in 1945. Her early research was in the genetics of Drosophila subobscura, but later switched to the reproductive biology of the guppy, Lebistes reticulatus. Her claim, in 1955, that parthenogenesis, which occurs in the guppy in nature, may also occur (though very rarely) in the human species, leading to so-called "virgin births" created some sensation among her colleagues and the lay public alike.

She and Haldane left University College London in 1956, and went to work at the Indian Statistical Institute in Kolkata. Haldane officially stated that he left the UK because of the Suez Crisis, writing: "Finally, I am going to India because I consider that recent acts of the British Government have been violations of international law." He believed that the warm climate would do him good, and that India shared his socialist dreams. Additionally, Helen had been arrested for being drunk and disorderly, and for refusing to pay a fine was sent to prison; the university sacked her, triggering Haldane's resignation.

At the Indian Statistical Institute, she turned her attention in 1959 to the genetics of the giant silkworm Antheraea paphia, raising them in captivity to test the quality of their silk. In January 1961 she and Haldane, assisted by their associate Krishna Dronamraju, were hosts to United States National Science Fair biology winners Gary Botting (zoology) and Susan Brown (botany). Using a novel technique of pheromone transfer, Botting had cross-bred an Antheraea paphia female with a Telea polyphemus male, with viable offspring. Botting and Spurway concluded that the Polyphemus moth was misclassified and should be included under the genus Antheraea.

At the time, the larvae of her specimens were developing black dots, which she attributed to adaptation to their artificial, dark environment in a similar way that the peppered moth (Biston betularia) had apparently adapted to its changing urban environment in Manchester, England. That "urban adaptation" scenario had been quoted in many textbooks as clear evidence of evolution in action. Haldane had himself made statistical calculations as early as 1924 about the strength of natural selection which would have been needed to replace the original peppered form with the black form. However Gary Botting diagnosed the black spots on Spurway's larvae as pébrine, a disease deadly to Lepidoptera.

Botting, being at that time a convinced biblical creationist and missionary for the Jehovah's Witnesses, concluded from Spurway's observations about the black dots on her larvae, and from other similar statements, that she and Haldane were "committed Lamarckian evolutionists" who were prepared to believe, without sufficient evidence, in the possibility of rapid evolutionary adaptation. Botting later credited the Haldanes with encouraging him to accept the precepts of Darwinian evolution.

Helen Spurway, Haldane, and Krishna Dronamraju were present at the Oberoi Grand Hotel in Kolkata when 1960 U.S. National Science Fair winner Susan Brown reminded the Haldanes that she and Botting had a previously scheduled event that would prevent them from accepting an invitation to a banquet proposed by Haldane and Helen in their honour and scheduled for that evening. After the two students had left the hotel, Haldane went on his much-publicized hunger strike to protest what he regarded as a "U.S. insult".

The following month (February 1961), the Haldanes, who were also irritated by the abrupt changes made by Director Prasanta Chandra Mahalanobis in the social programme of the visiting Soviet leader Alexei Kosygin, resigned from the Indian Statistical Institute. Eventually, they moved to Bhubaneswar, Orissa, to found the Genetics & Biometry Laboratory. However, Haldane soon developed cancer of the rectum and died there in 1964.

Helen Spurway's lifelong research interests also included animal behavior and domestication, which led to her close contacts with several eminent zoologists including Konrad Lorenz, Salim Ali, T. Dobzhansky and Ernst Mayr.

After her husband's death in 1964, in Bhubaneswar, Spurway moved to Hyderabad in Southern India and spent her remaining years there studying animal domestication, until her death in 1978.

== Publications ==
A partial list:

- Spurway, Helen. 1955. The Causes of Domestication: An attempt to integrate some ideas of Konrad Lorenz with evolution theory. Journal of Genetics 53:325-362.
- Spurway, Helen, and J. B. S. Haldane. 1953. The comparative ethology of vertebrate breathing. I. Breathing in newts, with a general survey. Behaviour 6:8-34
- Spurway, Helen, and K.R. Dronamraju. 1959. The biology of the two commercial qualities cocoons spun by Antheraea mylitta (Drury) with a note on the cocoons of the related A. assama (westwood). Genetica Agraria 45: 175.
- Dronamraju, K.R. and H. Spurway. 1960. Constancy to horticultural varieties shown by butterflies, and its possible evolutionary significance. Journal of Bombay Natural History Society, 57:136-150.
- Spurway Helen, S.D. Jayakar, and K.R. Dronamraju 1964. One nest of Sceliphron madraspatanum (Fabr.).(Sphecidae: Hynemoptera). Journal of the Bombay Natural History Society, 61: 1-42.
- Jayakar S. D. and Spurway H. 1966 Sex ratios of some mason wasps. Nature (London) 212:306-307
- Dronamraju, K.R. 1985. Haldane: The Life and Work of J.B.S. Haldane With Special Reference to India. Aberdeen University Press.
