= Darwin (unit) =

Unit of evolutionary change

The darwin (d) is a unit of evolutionary change, defined by J. B. S. Haldane in 1949. One darwin is defined to be an e-fold (about 2.718) change in a trait over one million years. Haldane named the unit after Charles Darwin.

== Equation ==
The equation for calculating evolutionary change in darwins ($r$) is:

$$r=\frac{{\rm ln} X_2 - {\rm ln} X_1}{\Delta  t}$$

where $X_1$ and $X_2$ are the initial and final values of the trait and $\Delta t$ is the change in time in millions of years. An alternative form of this equation is:

$$r=\frac{{\rm ln} \frac{X_2}{X_1}}{\Delta  t}$$

Since the difference between two natural logarithms is a dimensionless ratio, the trait may be measured in any unit. Inexplicably, Haldane defined the millidarwin as 10^{−9} darwins, despite the fact that the prefix milli- usually denotes a factor of one thousandth (10^{−3}).

== Application ==
The measure is most useful in palaeontology, where macroevolutionary changes in the dimensions of fossils can be compared. Where this is used it is an indirect measure as it relies on phenotypic rather than genotypic data. Several data points are required to overcome natural variation within a population. The darwin only measures the evolution of a particular trait rather than a lineage; different traits may evolve at different rates within a lineage. The evolution of traits can however be used to infer as a proxy the evolution of lineages.

== See also ==
- Evolutionary biology
- Macroevolution
- Microevolution
