= Marcello Siniscalco =

Italian scientist (1924–2013)

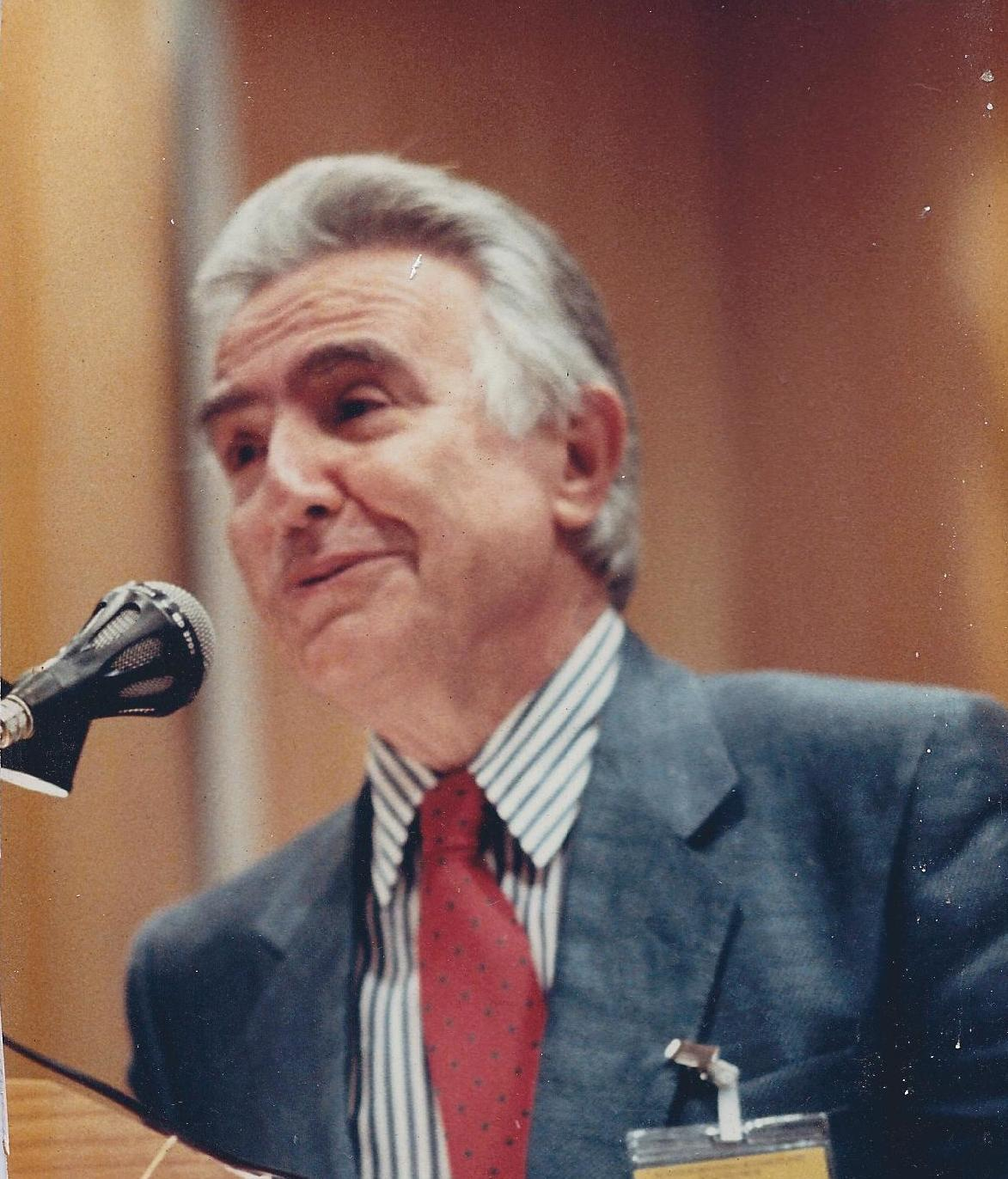
- Siniscalco at an international conference, 1995
- Born: 31 July 1924; Naples, Kingdom of Italy
- Died: 29 November 2013 (aged 89)
- Education: University of Naples
- Known for: Population genetics, mapping of the human genome
- Spouse(s): Marina Siniscalco, Emma De Filippis
- Children: Raffaello Siniscalco, Antonella Siniscalco, Federico Siniscalco, Anja Ullrich, Claudio Siniscalco
- Awards: Awarded title of Commendatore by the Italian Government
- Scientific career
- Fields: Genetics
- Academic advisors: Giuseppe Montalenti; J. B. S. Haldane

Marcello Siniscalco (31 July 1924 – 29 November 2013) was an Italian scientist at the forefront of the development of the nascent field of genetics. A contemporary of Watson and Crick, he spent a significant part of his international career heading the Department of Somatic Cell Genetics at Memorial Sloan Kettering Cancer Center in New York, but throughout his life maintained ties to his home country of Italy. Siniscalco pioneered the study of population and molecular genetics through his research on the population of Sardinia, analyzing the genes responsible for thalassemia and G6PD deficiency syndrome, among others. Siniscalco also played an important role in the development of the Human Genome Organisation (HUGO) in its early years, and was ultimately awarded the title of Commendatore by the Italian government in recognition of his contributions to his field.

== Early years ==
Marcello Siniscalco was born in Naples in 1924, the son of Raffaele Siniscalco, a hides and leather goods merchant, and Elena Funicella. Southern Italy offered stark choices at the time: poverty was the norm, Fascism was on the rise, and adolescents were politically indoctrinated in state-sponsored youth groups. Marcello instead found his niche as an intellectual influenced by early 20th-century philosopher Benedetto Croce and historian Adolfo Omodeo. Siniscalco developed a reputation for challenging the "powers that be" with his poetry and anti-establishment views. By the time of the outbreak of World War II, a teenaged Siniscalco moved with his family to the small town of Cava de' Tirreni, fifty kilometres from Naples, in order to escape the heavy Allied bombardments of the city and its harbour. By the age of 17, he became engaged to Emma (Emanuela) De Filippis, whom he married 8 years later.

During the war, Marcello matriculated at the University of Naples to study medicine and become a doctor, of which there was a desperate shortage. Throughout his medical studies, however, he also continued to invest in his intellectual passions. In 1943, together with his older brother Gino, he founded a cultural association and cinema group that brought many prominent intellectuals to Cava de' Tirreni, among them actor, dramatist and Neapolitan poet Eduardo De Filippo (many of whose poems Marcello would recite in Neapolitan dialect by memory throughout his life).

Although he never pursued a career as a practising doctor, it was his training in biology, and the tutelage of his mentor Professor Giuseppe Montalenti during the late 1940s and early 1950s at the Stazione Zoologica at the Naples Aquarium, that enabled Marcello to discover the nascent field of genetics. As a part of his doctorate in 1948, he completed a study on the relationship between nucleic acid metabolism and protein synthesis carried out in tiny crustaceans. This was one of the earliest known works attempting to understand the link between DNA and RNA (the central dogma of molecular biology), contributing to a school of academic thought which culminated in Watson and Crick’s Nobel-prize winning discovery a decade later. This was the beginning of a successful period during which Siniscalco pursued research based at the University of Naples, collaborating closely with a variety of other prominent Italian scientists of the time.

== International career ==
Recognizing that progress in his field of genetics was advancing faster abroad than in Italy, Marcello interspersed his career with international appointments. His first such adventure entailed moving to a smoggy London in 1952 at age 28 as a British Council Research Fellow at the Galton Laboratory, University College London, where – despite his beginner’s English - he was able to study alongside well-known researchers including J. B. S. Haldane, Lionel Penrose, Cedric Smith and Harry Harris. Due to his charm and numerous non-scientific interests, he also freelanced as a radio show host, which earned him ten guineas per hour, a multiple of his British Council fellowship. His roommate of the time, somewhat jealous of Marcello’s newfound cash flow, commented jokingly that he "knew of only one other profession which paid a similar hourly wage!"

Upon his return to Italy from the UK, Siniscalco's first three children were born: Raffaello (1949), Antonella (1951) and Federico (1956). Like many Italian professors of the mid-twentieth century, Siniscalco became a member of the establishment and a pillar of his community. However, due to early trips to symposia abroad to institutions such as MIT (1958) and elsewhere, the draw of international science proved too much, and within a decade, Siniscalco accepted an invitation to found and chair a new Department of Genetics at Leiden University, Netherlands (1962). A popular professor on campus, he delivered his 1963 University Inaugural Address on "Frontiers of Human Genetics" in front of Queen Juliana of the Netherlands. He spent the next 8 years commuting between the Netherlands during the academic year and Naples during the summers, continuing to collaborate with both Italian and other international colleagues.

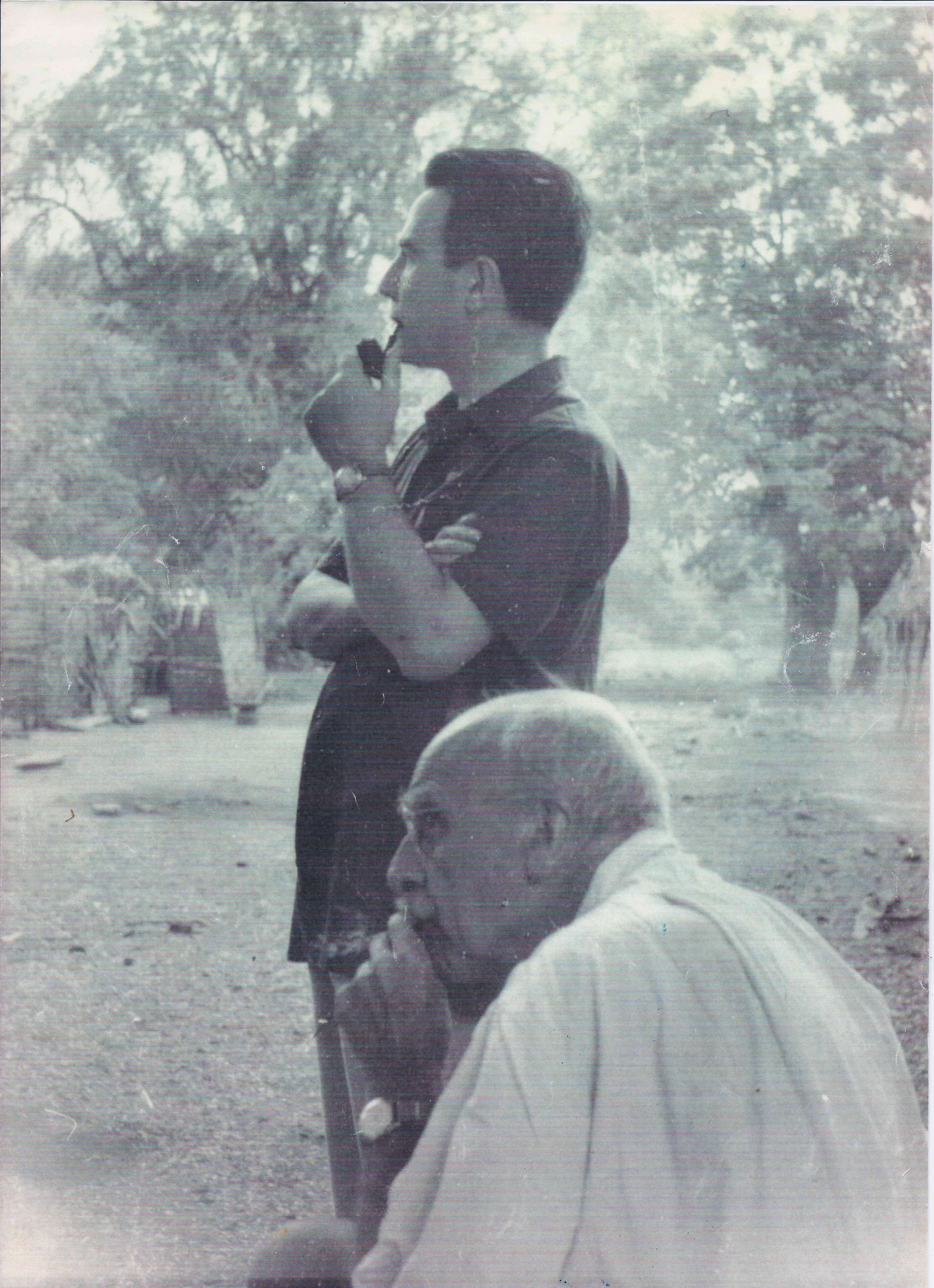
Siniscalco (standing) and J. B. S. Haldane in Andhra Pradesh, India, 1964

In the 1960s, together with his mentor J. B. S. Haldane, Siniscalco organized and financed a field trip to Andhra Pradesh, India, an expedition designed to find isolated populations that might offer more statistically significant data sets.

== United States ==
By 1967/8, however, it was on the other side of the Atlantic where genetics was making the greatest advancements. Marcello therefore accepted an invitation as Visiting Professor to the Albert Einstein College of Medicine (New York City) where he participated actively in the development of human somatic cell genetics department, while still maintaining his Professorship at the University of Naples. In 1973 Marcello returned to the States to join Memorial Sloan Kettering Cancer Center, where he became a "Member", heading the Department of Somatic Cell Genetics. The bulk of Marcello's publications were authored while there, and while at the Graduate School of Medical Sciences, Cornell University, both in New York City. According to an article in New Scientist at the time,

A very pretty illustration of the revolution taking place in human genetics, as a start is made upon the enormous task of mapping human genes, can be found in the latest Proceedings of the National Academy of Sciences. Until now, the most that has been possible using the traditional methods of poring over family trees has been the attribution of a few genes to particular chromosomes, usually the X chromosome. But the new and powerful combination of cell fusion techniques, with methods of reliably identifying chromosomes, means that crude mapping at this level is being greatly speeded up, and that the position of genes within chromosomes is now being tackled. Marcello Siniscalco is perhaps the leading exponent of this latter craft.

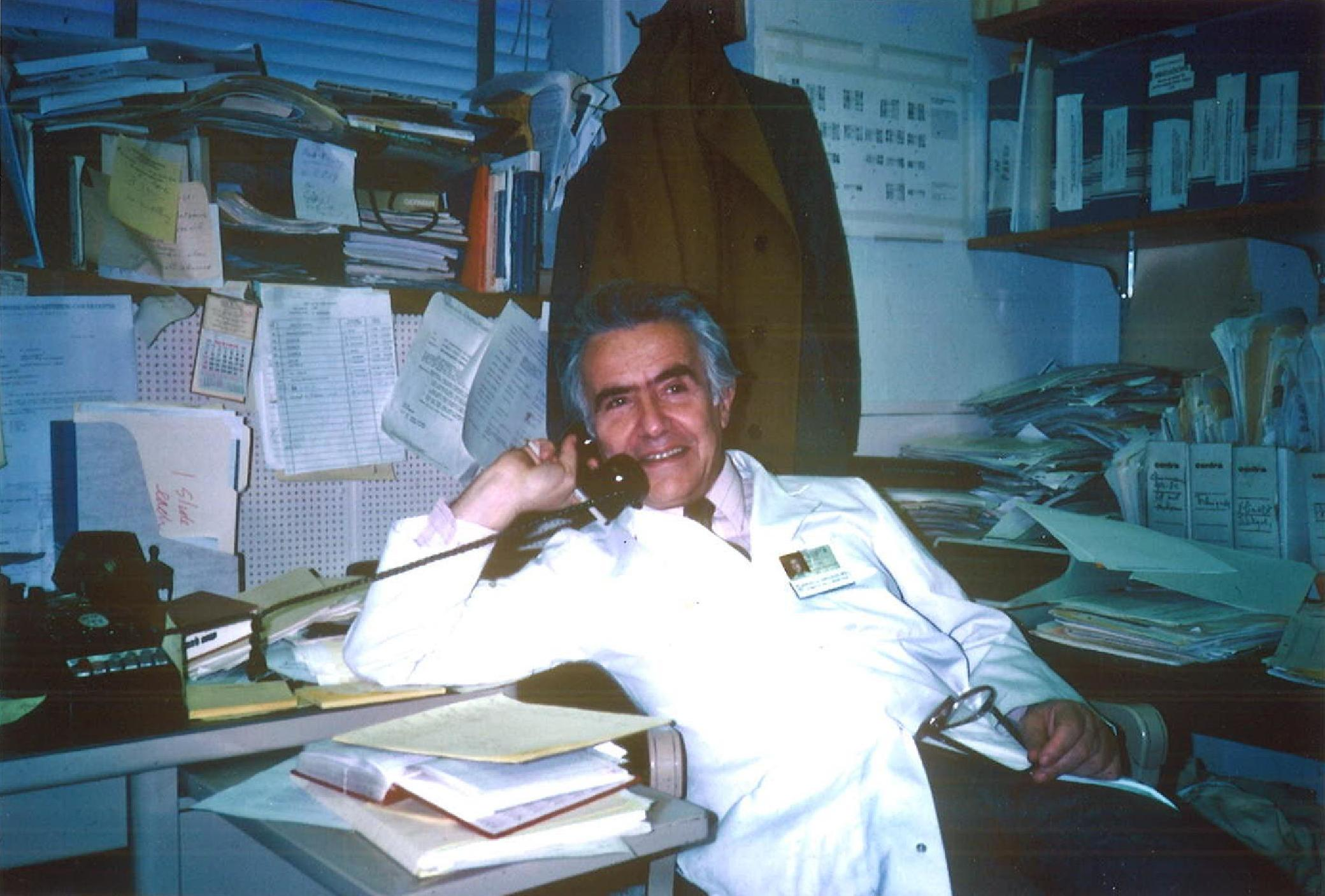
Siniscalco in his office at Memorial Sloan Kettering Cancer Center, 1984

Marcello met his second wife, Marina Wehde Kulbach, at an international conference in Berlin in 1971. Within two years, Marina joined Marcello in New York, along with her mother and young daughter Anja, whom Marcello eventually adopted. Their son Claudio was born there in 1976.

Throughout his over 20-year career in the United States, Siniscalco made a point of returning to his native Italy every summer for research purposes, specifically to the island of Sardinia. There, he took advantage of church genealogical records, as well as high incidences of complex diseases such as thalassemia and G6PD deficiency syndrome, to advance the field of population genetics. Siniscalco would move his family from New York to Sardinia for two to three months at a time. His summers consisted of data collection, often involving convincing sceptical shepherds in isolated mountain villages to allow him to take their families’ blood samples. Being the only "doctor" within reach led to some delicate situations, such as racing a woman in advanced labour down a windy and bumpy mountain road, fearing he might have to actually deliver her baby.

== Returning to Italy ==
In July 1989, Siniscalco returned to Italy, enticed by a government program designed to lure back the leading expatriate scientists of his generation, including contemporaries such as his close friends Luigi Luca Cavalli-Sforza, Rita Levi-Montalcini and Renato Dulbecco. After almost 20 years of commuting to Sardinia for data collection, Siniscalco, recognized as a "world-class researcher," could finally pursue his dream to found and create a Sardinian Center for Studies of Genome Diversity in Porto Conte. He could now perform population studies of human molecular variation onsite on the island itself, rather than having to transport samples abroad. In order to maintain a link to the international community, however, Siniscalco organized close cooperation with the Imperial Cancer Research Fund Laboratory of the UK (1989–1994), where he was hosted by Sir Walter Bodmer. Marcello also played an important role in the development of the Human Genome Organisation (HUGO) in its early years, which had the added benefit of allowing his young family to reside in London while he commuted back and forth to Alghero, Sardinia.

Siniscalco's vision was not only to improve efficiency by enabling local analysis of the Sardinian people's genome. He also sought to create a database of markers and mutations for complex diseases which could ultimately be made freely available to the general public via (then) nascent technologies such as the Internet (of which he was an extremely early adopter). Despite several entreaties and offers to explore financing from the venture capital/biotech community, and the commercial success of companies such as deCODE genetics in Iceland, Siniscalco always maintained that his research and the data gleaned from the Sardinian population should not be commercialized.

In 1992, Siniscalco was awarded the title of "Commendatore Ordine al Merito della Repubblica Italiana" by the Italian Government, and elected to the EEC Committee on Ethical, Legal and Social Implications of human genome analysis (ELSI) and the Committee for the Diffusion of Scientific Culture. Ultimately, this led to his participation as a member of an Advisory Committee to the then president of the EEC, Jacques Delors, on the ethics of biotechnologies from 1992 to 1994. He was also elected a member of the Human Genome Organisation’s Executive Committee on Human Genome Diversity, and authored the section on 'Genetics' for the Enciclopedia del Novecento, the modern complement to the Enciclopedia Italiana. Throughout the 1990s and 2000s, Siniscalco also dedicated himself toward dissemination of scientific knowledge through his involvement with the DNA Learning Center in Cold Spring Harbor and the Marino Golinelli Foundation in Bologna, Italy.

== Later years ==
During the last decade of his career, Siniscalco became a Professor of Genetics and consultant for population genomics at the Coriell Institute for Medical Research (in Camden, New Jersey), where his vision was to "immortalize" the bulk of the many samples he had collected over the years for future generations to analyze. Subsequently, and finally, he joined Rockefeller University in New York as a member of the Adjunct faculty at the Laboratory of Statistical Genetics, from which he published his final paper at the age of 86.
