= Haldane's sieve =

Genetics concept

Haldane's sieve is a concept in population genetics named after the British geneticist J. B. S. Haldane. It refers to the fact that dominant advantageous alleles are more likely to fix in the population than recessive alleles. Haldane's sieve is particularly relevant in situations where the effects of natural selection are strong and the beneficial mutations have a significant impact on an organism's fitness.

According to Haldane's sieve, when a new advantageous mutation arises in a population, it initially occurs as a single copy (a de novo mutation), borne by an heterozygous individual. This way, genetic dominance is important to estimate the fate of new mutations, that is, if new mutations are going to fix or go extinct. Dominant alleles are more readily exposed to directional selection since the moment they are rare, and thus they are more likely to fix as a result of a "hard sweep". The term "sieve" in Haldane's sieve metaphorically represents this filtering effect of natural selection.

When adaptation stems from the species pool of standing genetic variation, a "soft sweep", the rationale does not apply, because the allele is no longer rare in the beginning of the sweep. In fact, recessive alleles are more likely to sweep than dominant sweeps when alleles are previously maintained in the population.

Limited dispersal and population structure can reduce the effects of Haldane's sieve. In subdivided populations, limited dispersal increases inbreeding and homozygosity, allowing recessive alleles to express their beneficial effects more frequently and thus accelerate their fixation. This effect is most pronounced when dispersal is strongly limited (e.g., $FST > 0.2$).

Haldane's sieve has important implications for understanding the dynamics of adaptation and evolution in diploid populations. It highlights the role of natural selection in driving genetic changes in the presence of genetic dominance.

== See also ==
- Population genetics
- Selective sweep
- Natural selection
- Adaptive evolution
