= Suresh Jayakar =

Indian biologist (1937–1988)

Suresh Dinakar Jayakar (21 September 1937, Bombay – 21 January 1988) was an Indian biologist who pioneered in the use of quantitative approaches in genetics and biology.

He studied mathematical statistics, physics and mathematics at the University of Lucknow and joined the Indian Statistical Institute in 1959 where he met J. B. S. Haldane who had just moved to India. At that institute, Jayakar received early instruction in genetics in a course taught by Krishna Dronamraju and additional training with Helen Spurway.

He moved to Orissa when Haldane moved. He became the director of the Genetics and Biometry Laboratory after Haldane's death. He made many studies on yellow-wattled lapwings along with Helen Spurway. He collaborated with Helen Spurway and Krishna Dronamraju in studies of the nest building activity of the wasp Sceliphron madraspatanum (Fabr.).

He also made studies on quantitative genetics, sex-determination mechanisms.

He began work with J. B. S. Haldane working on quantitative aspects of genetics and biology. After Haldane's death, he moved to Italy at the invitation of Luigi Luca Cavalli-Sforza at the University of Pavia. Haldane considered him as a star who would rise in the "Indian scientific firmament".

== Publications ==
A partial list of publications includes:

- Haldane J. B. S. and Jayakar S. D. 1963 Polymorphism due to selection of varying direction. J. Genet. 58; 237-242
- Haldane J. B. S. and Jayakar S. D. 1963 Polymorphism due to selection depending on the composition of a population. J. Genet. 58: 318-323
- Haldane J. B. S. and Jayakar S. D. 1965 Selection for a single pair of allelomorphs with complete replacement, J. Genet. 59: 81-87
- Jayakar S. D. 1963 Proterandry. in solitary wasps. Nature (London) 198: 208-209
- Jayakar S. D. 1970 A mathematical model for interaction of gene frequencies in a parasite and its host. Theor. Pop. Biol. 1: 140-164
- Jayakar S.. D. 1970 On the detection and estimation of linkage between a locus influencing a quantitative character and a marker locus. Biometrics 26: 451-464
- Jayakar S. D. 1987 Some two locus models for the evolution of sex-determining mechanisms. Theor. Pop. Biol. 32: 188-215
- Jayakar S. D. and Cavalli-Sforza L. L. 1986 Gene frequency variation, population genetic structure, and natural selection. In African pygmies (ed.) L. L. Cavalli-Sforza (New York: Academic Press) pp. 319–338
- Spurway Helen, S.D. Jayakar, and K.R. Dronamraju 1964. One nest of Sceliphron madraspatanum (Fabr.).(Sphecidae: Hymenoptera). J. Bombay Nat. Hist. Soc., 61: 1-42.
