= On Being the Right Size =

1926 essay by J. B. S. Haldane

"On Being the Right Size" is a 1926 essay by J. B. S. Haldane which discusses proportions in the animal world and the essential link between the size of an animal and these systems an animal has for life. It was published as one of Haldane's collected essays in Possible Worlds and Other Essays.

== Thesis ==
Haldane's thesis is that sheer size very often defines what bodily equipment an animal must have:

Insects, being so small, do not have oxygen-carrying bloodstreams. What little oxygen their cells require can be absorbed by simple diffusion of air through their bodies. But being larger means an animal must take on complicated oxygen pumping and distributing systems to reach all the cells.

Many of his examples are based on the square–cube law, although he does not use that terminology.

The bigger an animal gets, the more it would have to change its physical shape, but the weaker it would become.

== Influence ==
This link has become known as Haldane's principle (not to be confused with Haldane's rule nor with Richard Burdon Haldane's Haldane principle), being referred to as such by urban planning theorist Jane Jacobs.

Another planning theorist, Christopher Alexander, refers to this principle in his theory of "Independent Regions" in A Pattern Language, citing Haldane:

...just as there is a best size for every animal, so the same is true for every human institution. In the Greek type of democracy all the citizens could listen to a series of orators and vote directly on questions of legislation. Hence their philosophers held that a small city was the largest possible democratic state...
