= J. B. S. Haldane =

Geneticist and evolutionary biologist (1892–1964)

J. B. S. Haldane FRS
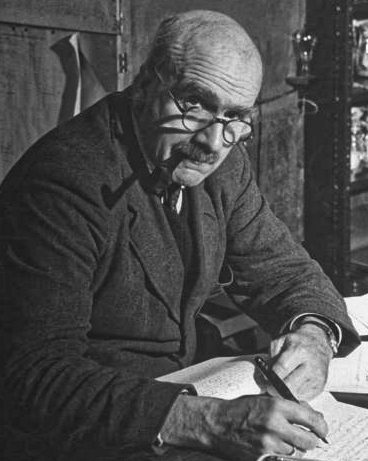
- Haldane c. 1940–1945
- Born: John Burdon Sanderson Haldane; 5 November 1892; Oxford, England
- Died: 1 December 1964 (aged 72); Bhubaneswar, Orissa, India
- Citizenship: United Kingdom (until 1961); India (from 1961)
- Education: New College, Oxford
- Known for: Haldane equation; Haldane mapping function; Haldane's prior; Haldane's sieve; Haldane's rule; Haldane's principle; Haldane's dilemma; Oparin–Haldane hypothesis; Darwin (unit); Enzymology; Hydrogen economy; Malaria resistance; Population genetics; Neo-Darwinism; Primordial soup; Heterotrophic theory; Fitness; Kin selection; Selection shadow
- Spouses: Charlotte Franken (m. 1926; div. 1945); Helen Spurway (m. 1945)
- Parents: John Scott Haldane (father); Louisa Kathleen Trotter (mother)
- Relatives: Naomi Mitchison (sister)
- Awards: Baly Medal (1913); Weldon Memorial Prize (1938); Darwin Medal (1952); Bateson Lecture (1957); Darwin–Wallace Medal (1958)
- Scientific career
- Fields: Biology; biostatistics
- Workplaces: University of Cambridge; University of California, Berkeley; University College London; Indian Statistical Institute
- Academic advisors: Frederick Gowland Hopkins
- Doctoral students: Helen Spurway; Krishna Dronamraju; John Maynard Smith
- Military career
- Allegiance: United Kingdom
- Branch: British Army
- Service years: 1914–1920
- Rank: Captain
- Unit: Black Watch

John Burdon Sanderson Haldane (/ˈhɔːldeɪn/; 5 November 1892 – 1 December 1964), nicknamed "Jack" or "JBS", was a British-born scientist and polymath, and a foundational figure in the modern synthesis of evolutionary biology. He worked in the fields of physiology, genetics, evolutionary biology, and mathematics. With innovative use of statistics in biology, he was one of the founders of neo-Darwinism. Largely self-taught in biology, he held professorships at the University of Cambridge, the Royal Institution, and University College London. Renouncing his British citizenship, he became an Indian citizen in 1961 and worked at the Indian Statistical Institute until his death in 1964.

Haldane's article on abiogenesis in 1929 introduced the "primordial soup theory", which became the foundation for the concept of the chemical origin of life. He established human gene maps for haemophilia and colour blindness on the X chromosome, and codified Haldane's rule on sterility in the heterogametic sex of hybrids in species. He correctly proposed that sickle-cell disease confers some immunity to malaria. He was the first to suggest the central idea of in vitro fertilisation, as well as concepts such as hydrogen economy, cis and trans-acting regulation, coupling reaction, molecular repulsion, the darwin (as a unit of evolution), and organismal cloning.

In 1957, Haldane articulated Haldane's dilemma, a limit on the speed of beneficial evolution, an idea that is still debated today. He is also remembered for his work in human biology, having coined "clone", "cloning", and "ectogenesis". With his sister, Naomi Mitchison, Haldane was the first to demonstrate genetic linkage in mammals. Subsequent works established a unification of Mendelian genetics and Darwinian evolution by natural selection whilst laying the groundwork for modern synthesis, and helped to create population genetics.

Haldane served in World War I, and obtained the rank of captain. He was a professed socialist, Marxist, atheist, and secular humanist whose political dissent led him to leave England in 1956 and live in India, becoming a naturalised Indian citizen in 1961. Arthur C. Clarke credited him as "perhaps the most brilliant science populariser of his generation". Brazilian-British biologist and Nobel laureate Peter Medawar called Haldane "the cleverest man I ever knew". According to Theodosius Dobzhansky, "Haldane was always recognized as a singular case"; Ernst Mayr described him as a "polymath" (as did others); Michael J. D. White described him as "the most erudite biologist of his generation, and perhaps of the century"; James Watson described him as "England's most clever and eccentric biologist", and Sahotra Sarkar described him as "probably the most prescient biologist of this [20th] century". According to a Cambridge student, "he seemed to be the last man who might know all there was to be known". He willed his body for medical studies, as he wanted to remain useful even in death.

== Biography ==
=== Early life and education ===
Haldane was born in Oxford in 1892. His father was the Scottish physiologist, scientist, philosopher, and Liberal, John Scott Haldane, who was the grandson of evangelist James Alexander Haldane. His mother Louisa Kathleen Trotter, was a Conservative of Scottish ancestry. His only sibling, Naomi Mitchison, became a prominent Scottish writer. His uncle was Viscount Haldane and his aunt was the author Elizabeth Haldane. Descended from an aristocratic and secular family of the Clan Haldane, he later claimed that his Y chromosome could be traced back to Robert the Bruce.

Haldane grew up at 11 Crick Road, North Oxford. He learnt to read at the age of three, and at four, after injuring his forehead, he asked the physician treating him about the bleeding, "Is this oxyhaemoglobin or carboxyhaemoglobin?" He was raised as an Anglican Christian. From age eight he worked with his father in their home laboratory where he experienced his first self-experimentation, the method he would later be famous for. He and his father became their own "human guinea pigs", such as in their investigation on the effects of poison gases. In 1899, his family moved to "Cherwell", a late Victorian house at the outskirts of Oxford with its own private laboratory. At age 8, in 1901, his father brought him to the Oxford University Junior Scientific Club to listen to a lecture on Mendelian genetics, which had been recently rediscovered. Although he found the lecture given by Arthur Dukinfield Darbishire, Demonstrator of Zoology at Balliol College, Oxford, "interesting but difficult", it influenced him permanently such that genetics became the field in which he made his most important scientific contributions.

His formal education began in 1897 at Oxford Preparatory School (now Dragon School), where he gained a First Scholarship in 1904 to Eton College. In 1905 he joined Eton, where he experienced severe abuse from senior students for allegedly being arrogant, but was befriended by Julian Huxley. The indifference of authority left him with a lasting hatred for the English education system. However, the ordeal did not stop him from becoming captain of the school.

He participated for the first time in scientific research as a volunteer subject for his father in 1906. John was the first to study the effects of decompression (relief from high pressure) in humans. He investigated the physiological condition called "bends", such as when goats lift and bend their legs if discomforted, that also may affect deep-sea divers. In July 1906, on board HMS Spanker off the west coast of Scotland, Rothesay, young Haldane jumped into the Atlantic Ocean with the experimental diving suit. The study was published in a 101-paged article in The Journal of Hygiene in 1908; where Haldane was described as "Jack Haldane (age 13)" for whom it "was the first time [he] had ever dived in a diving dress". The research became a foundation for a scientific theory called Haldane's decompression model.

He studied mathematics and classics at New College, Oxford, and obtained first-class honours in mathematical Moderations in 1912. He became engrossed in genetics and presented a paper on gene linkage in vertebrates in the summer of 1912. His first technical paper, a 30-page long article on haemoglobin function, was published that same year, as a co-author alongside his father. His mathematical treatment of the study was published in December 1913 in the Proceedings of the Physiological Society.

Haldane did not want his education to be confined to a specific subject; he took up Greats (classics) and graduated with first-class honours in 1914. While he had full intention of studying physiology, his plan was, as he described later, referring to World War I, "somewhat overshadowed by other events". His only formal education in biology was an incomplete course in vertebrate anatomy.

=== Career ===
To support the war effort, Haldane volunteered to join the British Army, and was commissioned a temporary second lieutenant in the 3rd Battalion of the Black Watch (Royal Highland Regiment) on 15 August 1914. He was assigned as the trench mortar officer, to lead his team for hand-bombing the enemy trenches, the experience of which he described as "enjoyable". In his article in 1932 he described how "he enjoyed the opportunity of killing people and regarded this as a respectable relic of primitive man". He was promoted to temporary lieutenant on 18 February 1915 and to temporary captain on 18 October. While serving in France, he was wounded by artillery fire and sent back to Scotland, where he served as instructor of grenades for the Black Watch recruits. In 1916, he joined the war in Mesopotamia (Iraq), where an enemy bomb severely wounded him. He was relieved from action and sent to India, where he stayed for the rest of the war. He returned to England in 1919 and relinquished his commission on 1 April 1920, retaining his rank of captain. For his ferocity and aggressiveness in battles, his commander described him as the "bravest and dirtiest officer in my Army". Another senior officer of his regiment called him 'mad' and 'cracked'.

Between 1919 and 1922, he served as Fellow of New College, Oxford, where, despite his lack of formal education in the field, he taught and researched in physiology and genetics. During his first year at Oxford, six of his papers dealing with physiology of respiration and genetics were published. He then moved to the University of Cambridge, where he accepted a newly created readership in biochemistry in 1923 and taught until 1932. During his nine years at Cambridge, he worked on enzymes and genetics, particularly the mathematical side of genetics. While working as a visiting professor at the University of California, Berkeley in 1932, he was elected Fellow of the Royal Society.

Haldane worked part-time at the John Innes Horticultural Institution (later named John Innes Centre) at Merton Park in Surrey from 1927 to 1937. When Alfred Daniel Hall became the director in 1926, one of his earliest tasks was to appoint as assistant director "a man of high quality in the study of genetics" who could become his successor. Upon the recommendation of Julian Huxley, the council appointed Haldane in March 1927, with the terms: "Mr. Haldane to visit the Institution fortnightly for a day and a night during the Cambridge terms, to put in two months also at Easter and long vacations in two continuous blocks and to be free in the Christmas vacation." He was officer in charge of Genetical Investigations. He became the Fullerian Professor of Physiology at the Royal Institution from 1930 to 1932 and in 1933 he became Professor of Genetics at University College London, where he spent most of his academic career. As Hall did not retire until 1939, Haldane did not in fact succeed him, but resigned from the John Innes in 1936 to become the first Weldon Professor of biometry at University College London. Haldane was credited with helping the John Innes become "the liveliest place for research in genetics in Britain". He moved his team to the Rothamsted Experimental Station in Hertfordshire from 1941 to 1944, during World War II, to escape bombings. Reginald Punnett, founder of the Journal of Genetics in 1910 with William Bateson, invited him to become editor in 1933, a post he retained until his death.

=== In India ===
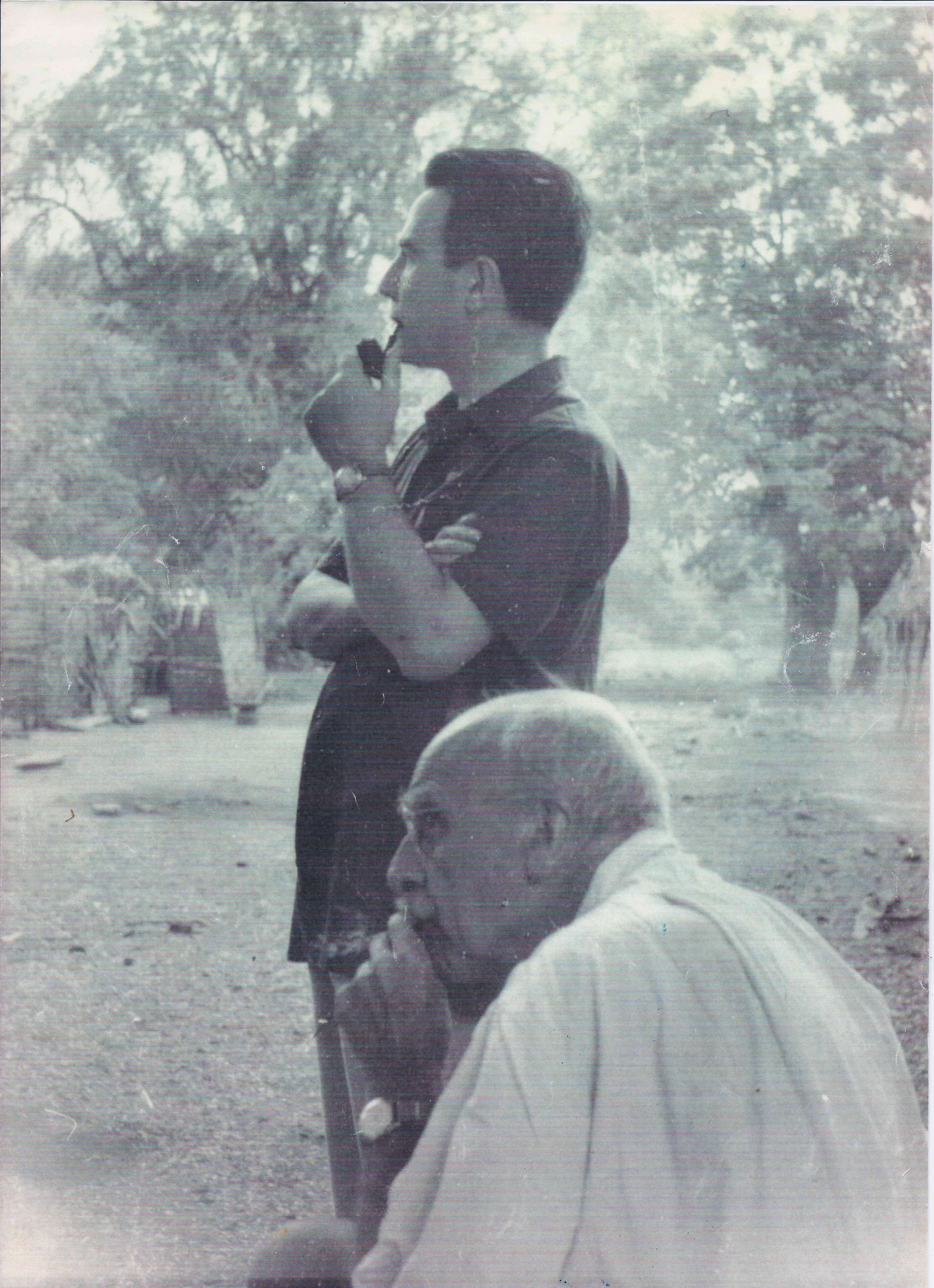
Marcello Siniscalco (standing) and Haldane in Andhra Pradesh, India, 1964

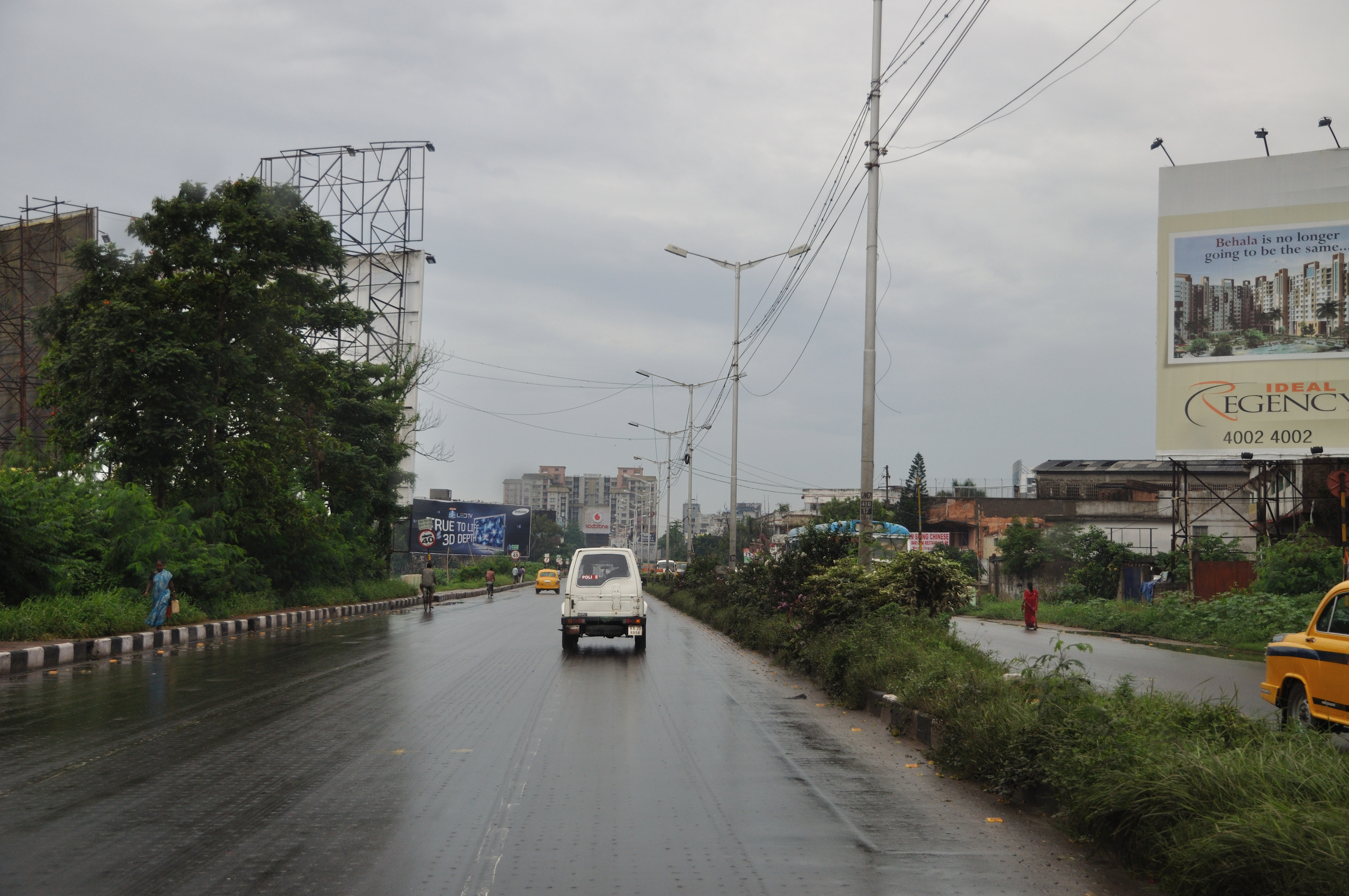
J. B. S. Haldane Avenue in Kolkata, the busy connecting road from Eastern Metropolitan Bypass to Park Circus area containing Science City

In 1956, Haldane left University College London, and joined the Indian Statistical Institute (ISI) in Calcutta where he worked in the biometry unit. Haldane gave many reasons for moving to India. Officially he stated that he left the UK because of the Suez Crisis, writing: "Finally, I am going to India because I consider that recent acts of the British Government have been violations of international law." He believed that the warm climate would do him good, and that India shared his socialist dreams. In an article "A passage to India" that he wrote in The Rationalists Annual in 1958, he stated: "For one thing I prefer Indian food to American. Perhaps my main reason for going to India is that I consider that the opportunities for scientific research of the kind in which I am interested are better in India than in Britain, and that my teaching will be at least as useful there as here." The university had sacked his wife Helen (Helen Spurway) for being drunk and disorderly and refusing to pay a fine, triggering Haldane's resignation. He decided that he would no longer wear socks, stating that "Sixty years in socks is enough." Afterwards, he always dressed in Indian attire.

Haldane was keenly interested in inexpensive research. Explaining in "A passage to India", he said, "Of course, if my work required electron microscopes, cyclotrons, and the like, I should not get them in India. But the sort of facilities which Darwin and Bateson used for their researches—such as gardens, gardeners, pigeon lofts, and pigeons—are more easily obtained in India than in England." He wrote to Julian Huxley about his observations on Vanellus malabaricus, the yellow-wattled lapwing. He advocated the use of Vigna sinensis (cowpea) as a model for studying plant genetics. He took an interest in the pollination of Lantana camara. He lamented that Indian universities forced those who took up biology to drop mathematics. He took an interest in the study of floral symmetry. In January 1961 he befriended Canadian lepidopterist Gary Botting, the 1960 U.S. Science Fair winner in zoology (who had first visited the Haldanes along with Susan Brown, 1960 U.S. National Science Fair winner in botany), inviting him to share the results of his experiments hybridising Antheraea silk moths. He, his wife Helen Spurway, and student Krishna Dronamraju were present at the Oberoi Grand Hotel in Calcutta when Brown reminded the Haldanes that she and Botting had a previously scheduled event that would prevent them from accepting an invitation to a banquet proposed by the Haldanes in their honour and had regretfully declined the honour. After the two students had left the hotel, Haldane went on his much-publicized hunger strike to protest what he regarded as a "U.S. insult". When the director of the ISI, P. C. Mahalanobis, confronted Haldane about both the hunger strike and the unbudgeted banquet, Haldane resigned from his post (in February 1961), and moved to a newly established biometry unit in Bhubaneswar, the capital of Orissa (Odisha).

Haldane took Indian citizenship; he was interested in Hinduism and became a vegetarian. In 1961, Haldane described India as "the closest approximation to the Free World". Jerzy Neyman objected that "India has its fair share of scoundrels and a tremendous amount of poor unthinking and disgustingly subservient individuals who are not attractive." Haldane retorted:

Perhaps one is freer to be a scoundrel in India than elsewhere. So one was in the U.S.A in the days of people like Jay Gould, when (in my opinion) there was more internal freedom in the U.S.A than there is today. The "disgusting subservience" of the others has its limits. The people of Calcutta riot, upset trams, and refuse to obey police regulations, in a manner which would have delighted Jefferson. I don't think their activities are very efficient, but that is not the question at issue.

When on 25 June 1962 he was described in print as a "Citizen of the World" by Groff Conklin, Haldane responded:

No doubt I am in some sense a citizen of the world. But I believe with Thomas Jefferson that one of the chief duties of a citizen is to be a nuisance to the government of his state. As there is no world state, I cannot do this. On the other hand, I can be, and am, a nuisance to the government of India, which has the merit of permitting a good deal of criticism, though it reacts to it rather slowly. I also happen to be proud of being a citizen of India, which is a lot more diverse than Europe, let alone the U.S.A, the U.S.S.R or China, and thus a better model for a possible world organisation. It may of course break up, but it is a wonderful experiment. So, I want to be labeled as a citizen of India.

Haldane found science teaching in India wanting. He said "the stupidity of the mynah shows that in birds, as in men, linguistic and practical abilities are not very highly correlated. A student who can repeat a page of a text book may get first class honours, but may be incapable of doing research."

=== Personal life ===
Haldane was married twice, first to Charlotte Franken and then to Helen Spurway. In 1924, Haldane met Charlotte Franken, who was a journalist for the Daily Express and married to Jack Burghes. Following the publication of Haldane's Daedalus, or Science and the Future, she interviewed Haldane and they began a relationship. In order to marry Haldane, Franken filed a divorce suit, which resulted in controversy as Haldane was involved as co-respondent in the legal proceeding. Additionally, as Sahotra Sarkar reported: "For her to secure a divorce, Haldane overtly committed adultery with her". Haldane's conduct was described as "gross immorality", for which he was formally dismissed by Cambridge's Sex Viri (a six-member disciplinary committee) from the university in 1925. Cambridge professors, including G. K. Chesterton, Bertrand Russell, and W. L. George, raised their defence for Haldane insisting that the university should not make such judgements, based solely on a professor's private life. The ouster was revoked in 1926. Haldane and Charlotte Franken were married in 1926. Following their separation in 1942, they divorced in 1945. Later that year he married Helen Spurway, his former PhD student. He also had an affair with Angel Records founder Dorle Soria.

Haldane once boasted about himself, saying, "I can read 11 languages and make public speeches in three; but am unmusical. I am a fairly competent public speaker." He had no children, but he and his father were important influences to his sister Naomi's children, of whom Denis Mitchison, Murdoch Mitchison, and Avrion Mitchison became professors of biology at the University of London, Edinburgh University, and University College London, respectively.

Inspired by his father, Haldane often used self-experimentation and would expose himself to danger in order to obtain data. To test the effects of acidification of the blood he drank dilute hydrochloric acid, enclosed himself in an airtight room containing 7% carbon dioxide, and found that it 'gives one a rather violent headache'. One experiment to study elevated levels of oxygen saturation triggered a fit that resulted in his suffering crushed vertebrae. In his decompression chamber experiments, he and his volunteers suffered perforated eardrums. But, as Haldane stated in What is Life, "the drum generally heals up; and if a hole remains in it, although one is somewhat deaf, one can blow tobacco smoke out of the ear in question, which is a social accomplishment".

Haldane made himself unpopular among his colleagues from the start of his academic career. In Cambridge, he annoyed most of the senior faculty due to his uninhibited behaviour, particularly at dinner. His partisan, Edgar Adrian (a 1932 Nobel laureate), had almost convinced Trinity College to offer him an appointment as a Fellow, but that was ruined by an incident when Haldane arrived at the dining table carrying a gallon jar of urine from his laboratory.

=== Later life and death ===
In the autumn of 1963, Haldane visited the US for a series of scientific conferences. At the University of Wisconsin, Sewall Wright introduced him before his speech, noting many of Haldane's achievements, after which Haldane modestly remarked that the introduction would have been more accurate if all the references to "Haldane" were replaced with "Wright". In Florida, he met, for the first and only time, the Russian biochemist Alexander Oparin, who had developed an origin of life theory quite independent of his own in the 1920s. It was while there that he started feeling abdominal pains.

Haldane went to London for a diagnosis. He was found to have colorectal cancer, and had a surgery in February 1964. Around that time Philip Dally was making a BBC documentary about eminent living scientists, which included Sewall Wright and the double Nobel laureate Linus Pauling. Dally's team approached Haldane at the hospital for the documentary profile, but instead of a filmed interview, Haldane gave them a self-obituary, the opening lines of which run:

I am going to begin with a boast. I believe that I am one of the [originally as "I am the most"] most influential people living today, although I haven't got a scrap of power. Let me explain. In 1932 I was the first person to estimate the rate of mutation of a human gene.

He also wrote a comic poem while in the hospital, mocking his own incurable disease. It was read by his friends, who appreciated the consistent irreverence with which Haldane had lived his life. The poem first appeared in print on 21 February 1964 issue of the New Statesman, and runs:

Cancer's a Funny Thing:
I wish I had the voice of Homer
To sing of rectal carcinoma,
Which kills a lot more chaps, in fact,
Than were bumped off when Troy was sacked ...

The poem ends:

...
Thanks to the nurses and Nye Bevan
The NHS is quite like heaven
Provided one confronts the tumour
With a sufficient sense of humour.
I know that cancer often kills,
But so do cars and sleeping pills;
And it can hurt one till one sweats,
So can bad teeth and unpaid debts.
A spot of laughter, I am sure,
Often accelerates one's cure;
So let us patients do our bit
To help the surgeons make us fit.

He willed that his body be used for medical research and instruction at the Rangaraya Medical College, Kakinada.

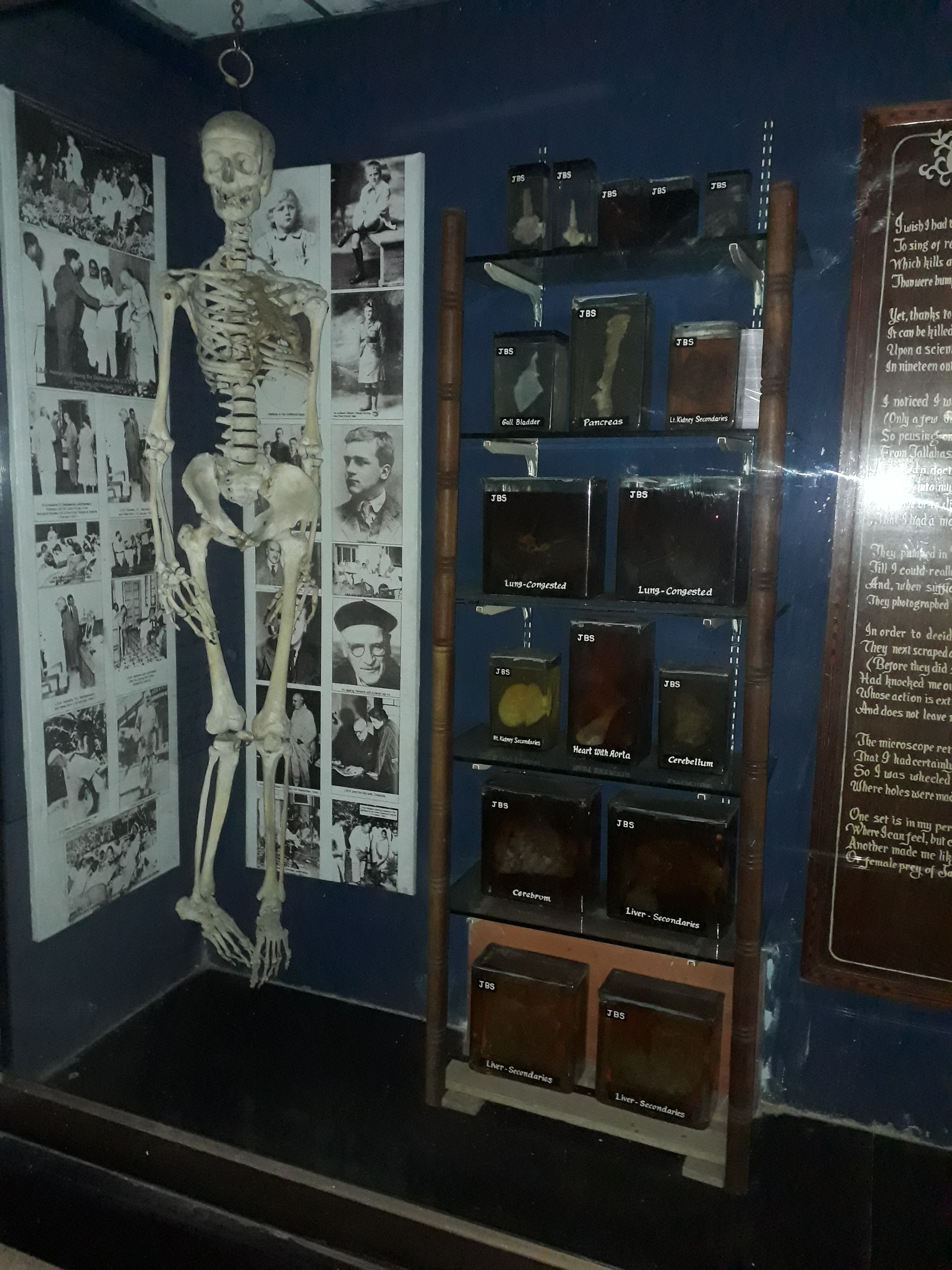
Haldane Museum Located in Rangaraya Medical College

My body has been used for both purposes during my lifetime and after my death, whether I continue to exist or not, I shall have no further use for it, and desire that it shall be used by others. Its refrigeration, if this is possible, should be a first charge on my estate.

His surgery in London was declared successful. But the symptoms reappeared after returning to India in June, and in August, the Indian doctors confirmed that his condition was terminal. Writing to John Maynard Smith on 7 September, he said, "I am not appreciably upset by the prospect of dying fairly soon. But I am very angry [at the English doctor who performed the operation]."

He died on 1 December 1964 in Bhubaneswar. On that day the BBC broadcast his self-obituary as "Professor J.B.S. Haldane, obituary." Following his will, his body was moved to Kakinada where Vissa Ramachandra Rao performed post-mortem and preservation of his body parts. His skeleton and organs are on display to the public in the Haldane Museum, located in the pathology department of Rangaraya Medical College.

== Scientific contributions ==
Following his father's footsteps, Haldane's first publication was on the mechanism of gaseous exchange by haemoglobin in The Journal of Physiology, and he subsequently worked on the chemical properties of blood as a pH buffer. He investigated several aspects of kidney functions and mechanism of excretion.

=== Genetic linkage ===
In 1904, Arthur Dukinfield Darbishire published a paper on an experiment attempting to test Mendelian inheritance between Japanese waltzing and albino mice. When Haldane came across the paper, he noticed that Darbishire had overlooked the possibility of genetic linkage in the experiment. Having sought advice from Reginald Punnett, a professor of biology at the University of Cambridge, he was ready to write a paper, but only after an independent experiment. With his sister Naomi and a friend one year his senior, Alexander Dalzell Sprunt, he started the experiment in 1908 using guinea pigs and mice. By 1912, the report was ready. The paper was entitled Reduplication in mice and published in the Journal of Genetics only in December 1915. It became the first demonstration of genetic linkage in mammals, showing that certain genetic traits tend to be inherited together (this was later discovered to be due to their proximity on chromosomes). (Between 1912 and 1914, genetic linkage had been reported in the fruit fly Drosophilla, silk moth, and plants.)

As the paper was written during Haldane's service during World War I, James F. Crow called it "the most important science article ever written in a front-line trench". Haldane recalled that he was the "only officer to complete a scientific paper from a forward position of the Black Watch". As was Haldane, Sprunt had joined 4th Battalion Bedfordshire Regiment at the start of World War I, and was killed at the Battle of Neuve Chapelle on 17 March 1915. It was upon this news that Haldane submitted the paper for publication, in which he remarked: "Owing to the war it has been necessary to publish prematurely, as unfortunately one of us (A. D. S.) has already been killed in France." He was also the first to demonstrate linkage in chickens in 1921, and (with Julia Bell) in humans in 1937.

=== Enzyme kinetics ===
In 1925, with G. E. Briggs, Haldane derived a new interpretation of the enzyme kinetic law of Victor Henri in 1903, better known as the 1913 Michaelis–Menten equation. Leonor Michaelis and Maud Menten assumed that enzyme (catalyst) and substrate (reactant) are in fast equilibrium with their complex, which then dissociates to yield product and free enzyme. By contrast, at almost the same time, Donald Van Slyke and G. E. Cullen treated the binding step as an irreversible reaction. The Briggs–Haldane equation was of the same algebraic form as both of the earlier equations, but their derivation is based on the quasi-steady state approximation, which is the concentration of intermediate complex (or complexes) does not change. As a result, the microscopic meaning of the "Michaelis Constant" (K_{m}) is different. Although commonly referring to it as Michaelis–Menten kinetics, most of the current models typically use the Briggs–Haldane derivation.

=== Haldane's principle ===
In his essay On Being the Right Size he outlines Haldane's principle, which states that the size very often defines what bodily equipment an animal must have: "Insects, being so small, do not have oxygen-carrying bloodstreams. What little oxygen their cells require can be absorbed by simple diffusion of air through their bodies. But being larger means an animal must have complicated oxygen pumping and distributing systems to reach all the cells."

=== Haldane's sieve ===
In 1927, Haldane pointed out that because selection mainly acts on heterozygotes, newly arisen dominant mutations are much more likely to be fixed, than are recessive ones, a mechanism now called Haldane's sieve. This leads to the expectation that adaptation from new mutations in large outcrossing populations should primarily proceed via fixing non-recessive beneficial mutations.

=== Origin of life ===
In 1929, Haldane introduced the modern concept of abiogenesis in an eight-page article entitled "The Origin of Life" in The Rationalist Annual, describing the primitive ocean as a "vast chemical laboratory" containing a mixture of inorganic compounds – like a "hot dilute soup" in which organic compounds could have formed. Under the solar energy the anoxic atmosphere containing carbon dioxide, ammonia, and water vapour gave rise to a variety of organic compounds, "living or half-living things". The first molecules reacted with one another to produce more complex compounds, and ultimately the cellular components. At some point a kind of "oily film" was produced that enclosed self-replicating nucleic acids, thereby becoming the first cell. J. D. Bernal named the hypothesis biopoiesis or biopoesis, the process of living matter spontaneously evolving from self-replicating, but lifeless molecules. Haldane further hypothesised that viruses were the intermediate entities between the prebiotic soup and the first cells. He asserted that prebiotic life would have been "in the virus stage for many millions of years before a suitable assemblage of elementary units was brought together in the first cell". The idea was generally dismissed as "wild speculation".

Alexander Oparin had suggested a similar idea in Russian in 1924 (published in English in 1936). The hypothesis gained some empirical support in 1953 with the classic Miller–Urey experiment. Since then, the primordial soup theory (Oparin–Haldane hypothesis) has become the foundation in the study of abiogenesis.

Although Oparin's theory became widely known only after the English version in 1936, Haldane accepted Oparin's originality and said, "I have very little doubt that Professor Oparin has the priority over me."

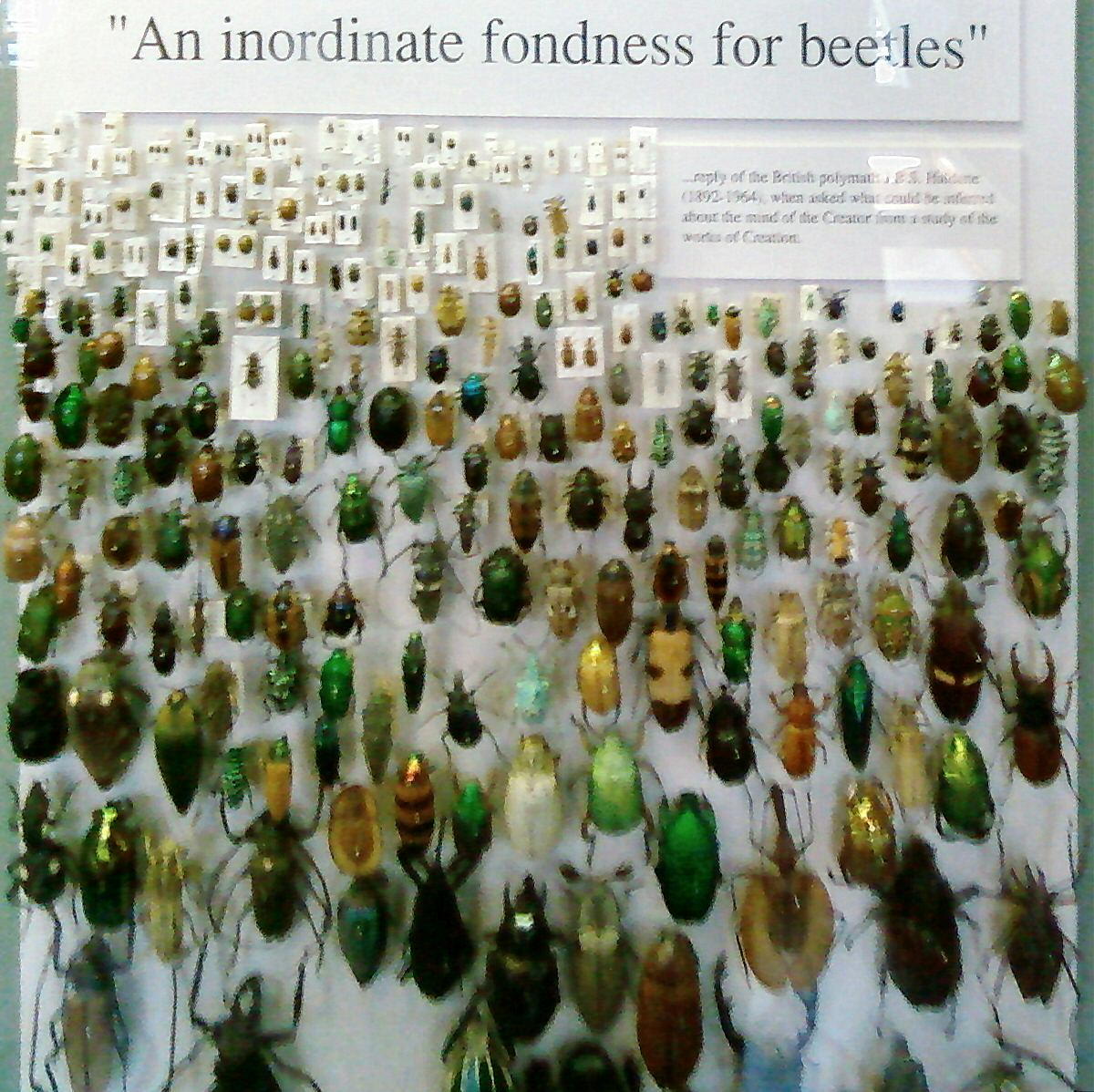
Oxford University Museum of Natural History display dedicated to Haldane and his reply when asked to comment on the mind of the Creator

Haldane is famous for the (possibly apocryphal) response that he gave when some theologians asked him what could be inferred about the mind of the Creator from the works of His Creation: "an inordinate fondness for beetles", or sometimes he would respond: "an inordinate fondness for stars and beetles".

Haldane recognized that although evolution took random path, that science typically examined adaptations in hindsight. He wrote that "Teleology is like a mistress to a biologist: he cannot live without her but he's unwilling to be seen with her in public."

=== Malaria and sickle-cell anemia ===
Haldane was the first to realise the evolutionary link between genetic disorder and infection in humans. While estimating the rates of human mutation in different situations and diseases, he noted that mutations expressed in red blood cells, such as thalassemias, were prevalent only in tropical regions where deadly infection such as malaria has been endemic. He further observed that these were favourable traits (heterozygous inheritance of sickle cell trait) for natural selection that protected individuals from receiving malarial infection. He introduced his hypothesis at the Eighth International Congress of Genetics held in 1948 at Stockholm on a topic "The Rate of Mutation of Human Genes". He proposed that genetic disorders in humans living in malaria-endemic regions provided a condition (phenotype) that makes them relatively immune to malarial infections. He formalised the concept in a technical paper published in 1949 in which he made a prophetic statement: "The corpuscles of the anaemic heterozygotes are smaller than normal, and more resistant to hypotonic solutions. It is at least conceivable that they are also more resistant to attacks by the sporozoa which cause malaria." This became known as "Haldane's malaria hypothesis", or concisely, the "malaria hypothesis". This hypothesis was eventually confirmed by Anthony C. Allison in 1954 in the case of sickle-cell anemia.

=== Population genetics ===
Haldane was one of the three major figures to develop the mathematical theory of population genetics, along with Ronald Fisher and Sewall Wright. He thus played an important role in the modern evolutionary synthesis of the early 20th century. He re-established natural selection as the central mechanism of evolution by explaining it as a mathematical consequence of Mendelian inheritance. He wrote a series of ten papers, A Mathematical Theory of Natural and Artificial Selection, deriving expressions for the direction and rate of change of gene frequencies, and also analyzing the interaction of natural selection with mutation and migration. The series consists of ten papers published between 1924 and 1934 in journals such as Biological Reviews (part II), Mathematical Proceedings of the Cambridge Philosophical Society (parts I and from III to IX), and Genetics (part X). He gave a set of lectures based on this series at the University of Wales in 1931, and they were summarised in his book, The Causes of Evolution in 1932.

His first paper on the series in 1924 specifically deals with the rate of natural selection in peppered moth evolution. He predicted that environmental conditions can favour the increase or decline of either the dominant (in this case the black or melanic forms) or the recessive (the grey or wild type) moths. For a sooty environment such as Manchester, where the phenomenon was discovered in 1848, he predicted that the "fertility of the dominants must be 50% greater than that of the recessives". According to his estimate, assuming 1% dominant form in 1848 and about 99% in 1898, "48 generations are needed for the change [for the dominant to appear]... After only 13 generations the dominants would be in a majority." Such mathematical prediction was considered improbable for natural selection in nature, but it was subsequently proven by an elaborate experiment (named Kettlewell's experiment) that was performed by an Oxford zoologist Bernard Kettlewell between 1953 and 1958. Haldane's prediction was proven further by a Cambridge geneticist Michael Majerus in his experiments conducted between 2001 and 2007.

His contributions to statistical human genetics included: the first methods using maximum likelihood for the estimation of human linkage maps; pioneering methods for estimating human mutation rates; the first estimates of mutation rate in humans (2 × 10^{−5} mutations per gene per generation for the X-linked haemophilia gene); and the first notion that there is a "cost of natural selection". He was the first to estimate the rate of human mutation in his 1932 book entitled The Causes of Evolution. At the John Innes Horticultural Institution, he developed the complicated linkage theory for polyploids; and extended the idea of gene-enzyme relationships with the biochemical and genetic study of plant pigments.

Although Haldane did not come up with an explicit gene-centric view of life he had an idea of inclusive fitness when he responded to whether he would lay down his life for his brother by supposedly replying that he would give up his life for "two brothers or eight cousins".

== Political views ==
Haldane became a socialist during the First World War, supported the Second Spanish Republic during the Spanish Civil War, and then became an open supporter of the Communist Party of Great Britain in 1937. A pragmatic dialectical-materialist Marxist, he wrote many articles for the Daily Worker. In On Being the Right Size, he wrote that "while nationalization of certain industries is an obvious possibility in the largest of states, I find it no easier to picture a completely socialized British Empire or United States than an elephant turning somersaults or a hippopotamus jumping a hedge".

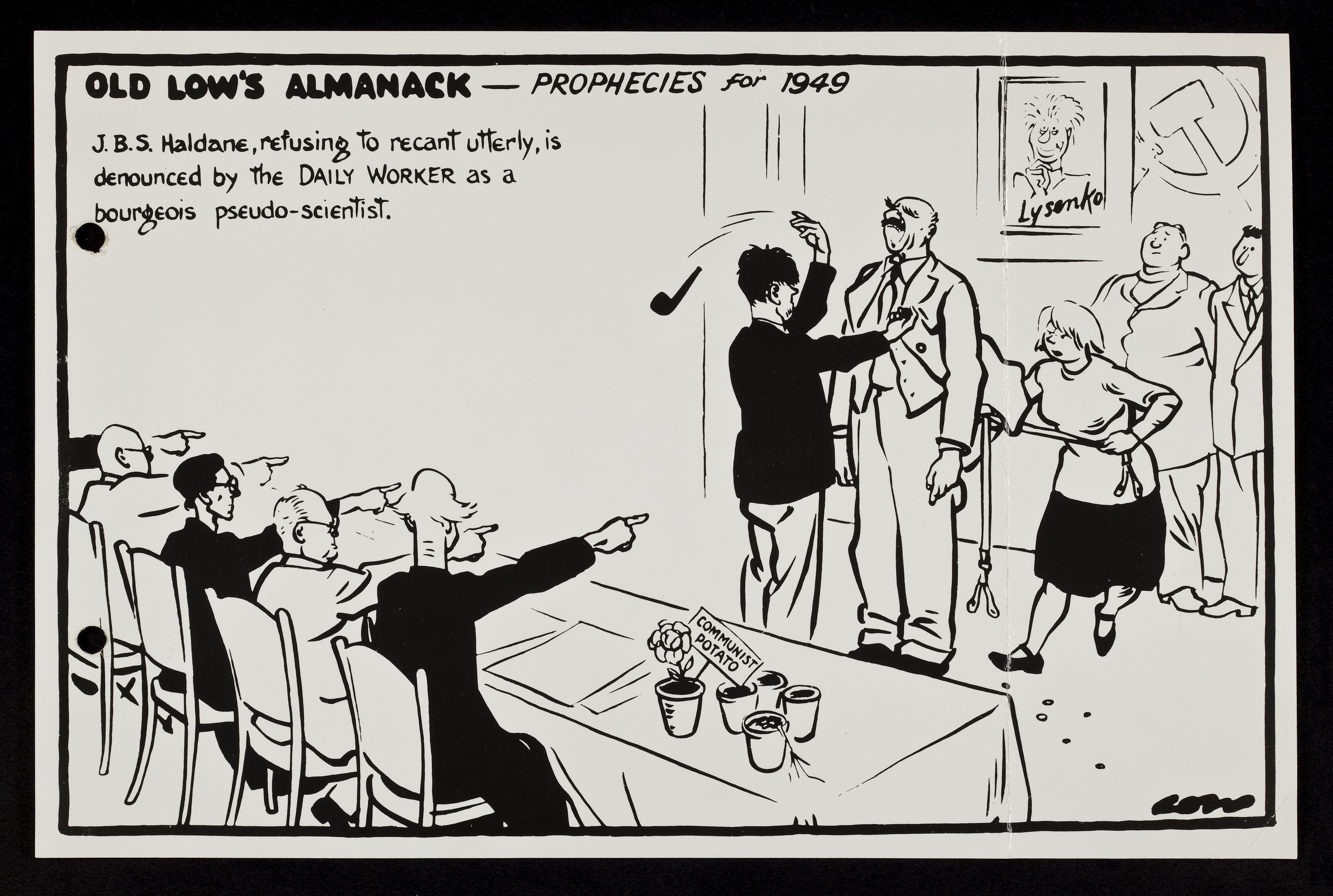
A David Low cartoon featuring Haldane – "Prophesies for 1949"

In 1938, Haldane proclaimed enthusiastically: "I think that Marxism is true." He joined the Communist Party in 1942. He was pressed to speak out about the rise of Lysenkoism and the persecution of geneticists in the Soviet Union as anti-Darwinist and the political suppression of genetics as incompatible with dialectical materialism. He shifted his polemic focus to the United Kingdom, criticizing the dependence of scientific research on financial patronage. In 1941, he wrote about the Soviet trial of his friend and fellow geneticist, Nikolai Vavilov:

The controversy among Soviet geneticists has been largely one between the academic scientist, represented by Vavilov and interested primarily in the collection of facts, and the man who wants results, represented by Lysenko. It has been conducted not with venom, but in a friendly spirit. Lysenko said (in the October discussions of 1939): 'The important thing is not to dispute; let us work in a friendly manner on a plan elaborated scientifically. Let us take up definite problems, receive assignments from the People's Commissariat of Agriculture of the USSR and fulfil them scientifically. Soviet genetics, as a whole, is a successful attempt at synthesis of these two contrasted points of view.'

By the end of the Second World War, Haldane had become an explicit critic of the Soviet regime. Haldane pushed back against Lysenkoism for its untenable assertions of human behaviour's limitless potential to be shaped by the environment, though he continued to argue for the utility of Marxist philosophical approaches to biology until 1948. The Soviet Union's blanket condemnation of genetics as "bourgeois science" and even the principle of scientific freedom as a bourgeois ideal stunned Haldane. He left the party in 1950, shortly after considering standing for Parliament as a Communist Party candidate. He continued to admire Joseph Stalin, describing him in 1962 as "a very great man who did a very good job". Haldane has been accused by authors including Peter Wright and Chapman Pincher of having been a Soviet GRU spy codenamed Intelligentsia.

== Social and scientific views ==
=== Human cloning ===
Haldane was the first to have thought of the genetic basis for human cloning, and the eventual artificial breeding of superior individuals. For this he introduced the terms "clone" and "cloning", modifying the earlier "clon" that had been used in agriculture since the early 20th century (from Greek klōn, twig). He introduced the term in his speech on "Biological Possibilities for the Human Species of the Next Ten Thousand Years" at the Ciba Foundation Symposium on Man and his Future in 1963. He said:

It is extremely hopeful that some human cell lines can be grown on a medium of precisely known chemical composition. Perhaps the first step will be the production of a clone from a single fertilized egg, as in Brave New World...

On the general principle that men will make all possible mistakes before choosing the right path, we shall no doubt clone the wrong people [such as Hitler]...

Assuming that cloning is possible, I expect that most clones would be made from people aged at least fifty, except for athletes and dancers, who would be cloned younger. They would be made from people who were held to have excelled in a socially acceptable accomplishment.

=== Ectogenesis and in vitro fertilisation ===
His essay Daedalus; or, Science and the Future (1924) posited the concept of in vitro fertilisation, which he called ectogenesis. He envisioned ectogenesis as a tool for creating better individuals (eugenics). Haldane's work was an influence on Huxley's Brave New World (1932) and was also admired by Gerald Heard. Various essays on science were collected and published in a volume entitled Possible Worlds in 1927. His book, A.R.P. (Air Raid Precautions) (1938) combined his physiological research into the effects of stress upon the human body with his experience of air raids during the Spanish Civil War to provide a scientific account of the likely effects of the air raids that Britain was to endure during the Second World War.

=== Criticism of C. S. Lewis ===
Along with Olaf Stapledon, Charles Kay Ogden, I. A. Richards, and H. G. Wells, Haldane was accused by C. S. Lewis of scientism. Haldane criticised Lewis and his Ransom Trilogy for the "complete mischaracterisation of science, and his disparagement of the human race". Haldane wrote a book for children entitled My Friend Mr. Leakey (1937), containing the stories "A Meal With a Magician", "A Day in the Life of a Magician", "Mr. Leakey's Party", "Rats", "The Snake with the Golden Teeth", and "My Magic Collar Stud". Later editions featured illustrations by Quentin Blake. Haldane also wrote an essay criticising Lewis's arguments for the existence of God, entitled "More Anti-Lewisite", a reference to the poison gas and its antidote.

=== Hydrogen-generating windmills ===
In 1923, in a talk given in Cambridge entitled "Science and the Future", Haldane, foreseeing the exhaustion of coal for power generation in Britain, proposed a network of hydrogen-generating windmills. This is the first proposal of the hydrogen-based renewable energy economy.

=== Scientists ===
In his An Autobiography in Brief, published shortly before his death in India, Haldane named four close associates as showing promise to become illustrious scientists: T. A. Davis, Dronamraju Krishna Rao, Suresh Jayakar, and S. K. Roy.

== Awards and honours ==
Haldane was elected a Fellow of the Royal Society in 1932. The French Government conferred him its National Order of the Legion of Honour in 1937. In 1952, he received the Darwin Medal from the Royal Society. In 1956, he was awarded the Huxley Memorial Medal of the Anthropological Institute of Great Britain. He received the Feltrinelli Prize from Accademia Nazionale dei Lincei in 1961. He also received an Honorary Doctorate of Science, an Honorary Fellowship at New College, Oxford, and the Kimber Award of the National Academy of Sciences in the United States. He was awarded the Linnean Society of London's prestigious Darwin–Wallace Medal in 1958.

=== Legacy ===
The Haldane Lecture at the John Innes Centre, where Haldane worked from 1927 to 1937 is named in his honour. The JBS Haldane Lecture of The Genetics Society is named in his honour as well.

In the novel Antic Hay (1923) Haldane was parodied by his friend Aldous Huxley as an obsessive self-experimenter described as "the biologist too absorbed in his experiments to notice his friends bedding his wife".

A major thoroughfare in Kolkata is named in his honor. J. B. S. Haldane Avenue is a busy connector road from the Eastern Metropolitan Bypass to the Park Circus–Science City area. Named after Haldane, who headed the biometry unit at the Indian Statistical Institute in Kolkata after moving to India in 1957, the avenue runs past the prominent Science City complex and serves as a key traffic link in the eastern part of the city.

== Collections ==
Haldane's archive is held at University College London. It includes personal and family papers, correspondence, documents relating to his involvement in committees and societies, and extensive scientific research notes.

== Quotations ==
- "My own suspicion is that the universe is not only queerer than we suppose, but queerer than we can suppose."
- "It seems to me immensely unlikely that mind is a mere by-product of matter. For if my mental processes are determined wholly by the motions of atoms in my brain I have no reason to suppose that my beliefs are true. They may be sound chemically, but that does not make them sound logically. And hence I have no reason for supposing my brain to be composed of atoms."
- "I suppose the process of acceptance will pass through the usual four stages: (i) This is worthless nonsense; (ii) This is an interesting, but perverse, point of view; (iii) This is true, but quite unimportant; (iv) I always said so."

== Selected publications ==
- Daedalus; or, Science and the Future (1924), E. P. Dutton and Company, Inc., a paper read to the Heretics, Cambridge, on 4 February 1923 (on Gutenberg)
  - second edition (1928), London: Kegan Paul, Trench & Co.
  - see also Haldane's Daedalus Revisited (1995), ed. with an introduction by Krishna R. Dronamraju, foreword by Joshua Lederberg; with essays by M. F. Perutz, Freeman Dyson, Yaron Ezrahi, Ernst Mayr, Elof Axel Carlson, D. J. Weatherall, N. A. Mitchison, and the editor. Oxford University Press. ISBN 0-19-854846-X
- A Mathematical Theory of Natural and Artificial Selection, a series of papers beginning in 1924
- Briggs, G. E; Haldane, J. B (1925). "A note on the kinetics of enzyme action". Biochemical Journal. 19 (2): 338–339. doi:10.1042/bj0190338. PMC 1259181. PMID 16743508. (With G.E. Briggs)
- Callinicus: A Defence of Chemical Warfare (1925), E. P. Dutton (in Gutenberg)
- Possible Worlds and Other Essays; Internet Archive copy (1927), Chatto & Windus; 2001 reprint, Transaction Publishers: ISBN 0-7658-0715-7 (includes "On Being the Right Size", "On Being One's Own Rabbit", and "The Last Judgment" (an essay sequel to Daedalus).
- "The origin of life" in the Rationalist Annual (1929)
- Animal Biology (1929) Oxford: Clarendon
- The Sciences and Philosophy (1929) NY: Doubleday, Doran, and Company. By John Scott Haldane, JBS Haldane's father
- Enzymes (1930), MIT Press 1965 edition with new preface by the author written just prior to his death: ISBN 0-262-58003-9
- Haldane, J. B (1931). "Mathematical Darwinism: A discussion of the genetical theory of natural selection". The Eugenics Review. 23 (2): 115–117. PMC 2985031. PMID 21259979.
- The Inequality of Man, and Other Essays (1932)
- The Causes of Evolution London: Longmans, Green, 1932
- Science and Human Life (1933), Harper and Brothers, Ayer Co. reprint: ISBN 0-8369-2161-5
- Science and the Supernatural: Correspondence with Arnold Lunn (1935), Sheed & Ward, Inc.
- Fact and Faith (1934), Watts Thinker's Library
- Human Biology and Politics (1934)
- "A Contribution to the Theory of Price Fluctuations", The Review of Economic Studies, 1:3, 186–195 (1934)
- My Friend Mr Leakey (1937), Jane Nissen Books reprint (2004): ISBN 978-1-903252-19-2
- "A Dialectical Account of Evolution" in Science & Society Volume I (1937)
- Haldane, J. B (1937). "View on race and eugenics: propaganda or science?". The Eugenics Review. 28 (4): 333–334. PMC 2985639. PMID 21260239.
- Bell, J; Haldane, J. B (1937). "The Linkage between the Genes for Colour-blindness and Haemophilia in Man". Annals of Human Genetics. 50 (1): 3–34. Bibcode:1937RSPSB.123..119B. doi:10.1111/j.1469-1809.1986.tb01935.x. PMID 3322165. S2CID 86421060. (with Julia Bell)
- Haldane, J. B; Smith, C. A (1947). "A new estimate of the linkage between the genes for colourblindness and haemophilia in Man". Annals of Eugenics. 14 (1): 10–31. doi:10.1111/j.1469-1809.1947.tb02374.x. PMID 18897933. (with C.A.B. Smith)
- Air Raid Precautions (A.R.P.) (1938), Victor Gollancz
- Heredity and Politics (1938), Allen and Unwin
- "Reply to A.P. Lerner's Is Professor Haldane's Account of Evolution Dialectical?" in Science & Society volume 2 (1938)
- The Marxist Philosophy and the Sciences (1939), Random House, Ayer Co. reprint: ISBN 0-8369-1137-7
- Preface to Engels' Dialectics of Nature (1939)
- Science and Everyday Life (1940), Macmillan, 1941 Penguin, Ayer Co. 1975 reprint: ISBN 0-405-06595-7
- "Lysenko and Genetics" in Science & Society volume 4 (1940)
- "Why I am a Materialist" in Rationalist Annual (1940)
- "The Laws of Nature" in Rationalist Annual (1940)
- Science in Peace and War (1941), Lawrence & Wishart Ltd.
- New Paths in Genetics (1941), George Allen & Unwin
- Heredity & Politics (1943), George Allen & Unwin
- Why Professional Workers should be Communists (1945), London: Communist Party (of Great Britain) In this early four page pamphlet, Haldane contends that Communism should appeal to professionals because Marxism is based on the scientific method and Communists hold scientists as important; Haldane subsequently disavowed this position.
- Adventures of a Biologist (1947)
- Science Advances (1947), Macmillan
- What is Life? (1947), Boni and Gaer, 1949 edition: Lindsay Drummond
- Everything Has a History (1951), Allen & Unwin—Includes "Auld Hornie, F.R.S."; C.S. Lewis's "Reply to Professor Haldane" is available in "On Stories and Other Essays on Literature", ed. Walter Hooper (1982), ISBN 0-15-602768-2
- "The Origins of Life", New Biology, 16, 12–27 (1954). Suggests that an alternative biochemistry could be based on liquid ammonia.
- The Biochemistry of Genetics (1954)
- Haldane, J. B (1955). "Origin of Man". Nature. 176 (4473): 169–170. Bibcode:1955Natur.176..169H. doi:10.1038/176169a0. PMID 13244650. S2CID 4183620.
- Haldane, J. B. S (1957). "The cost of natural selection". Journal of Genetics. 55 (3): 511–524. doi:10.1007/BF02984069. S2CID 32233460.
- Haldane, J. B (1956). "Natural selection in man". Acta Genetica et Statistica Medica. 6 (3): 321–332. doi:10.1159/000150849. PMID 13434715. S2CID 4186230.
- "Cancer's a Funny Thing", in New Statesman, 21 February 1964

== See also ==
- Experiments in the Revival of Organisms, a 1940 Soviet film featuring Haldane in the introduction
- List of independent discoveries ("primordial soup" theory of the evolution of life from carbon-based molecules, c. 1924)
- Precambrian rabbit
- Timeline of hydrogen technologies

Academic offices
| Preceded by Julian Huxley | Fullerian Professor of Physiology; 1930–1933 | Succeeded by Grafton Elliot Smith |
