= A Mathematical Theory of Natural and Artificial Selection =

Series of scientific papers by J. B. S. Haldane

A Mathematical Theory of Natural and Artificial Selection is the title of a series of scientific papers by the British population geneticist J.B.S. Haldane, published between 1924 and 1934. Haldane outlines the first mathematical models for many cases of evolution due to selection, an important concept in the modern synthesis of Darwin's theory with Mendelian genetics.

== Overview ==
The papers were published in ten parts over ten years in three different journals.

Part	Year	Subtitle (if applicable)	Reference	External links
I	1924	-	Transactions of the Cambridge Philosophical Society 23:19-41	Evolution - Classic texts Springer website
II	1924	The influence of partial self-fertilisation, inbreeding, assortative mating and selective fertilisation on the composition of Mendelian populations and on natural selection	Proceedings of the Cambridge Philosophical Society. Biological Sciences 1:158-163	Wiley Interscience website
III	1926	-	Proceedings of the Cambridge Philosophical Society 23:363-372	CJO website
IV	1927	-	Proceedings of the Cambridge Philosophical Society 23:607-615	CJO website
V	1927	Selection and mutation	Proceedings of the Cambridge Philosophical Society 23:838-844	CJO website
VI	1930	Isolation	Proceedings of the Cambridge Philosophical Society 26:220-230	CJO website
VII	1931	Selection intensity as a function of mortality rate	Proceedings of the Cambridge Philosophical Society 27:131-136	CJO website
VIII	1932	Metastable populations	Proceedings of the Cambridge Philosophical Society 27:137-142	CJO website
IX	1932	Rapid selection	Proceedings of the Cambridge Philosophical Society 28:244-248	CJO website
X	1934	Some theorems on artificial selection	Genetics 19:412-429	Genetics website
