= Dronamraju Krishna Rao =

Indian-born geneticist

- Born: 14 January 1937; Pithapuram, Andhra Pradesh, India
- Died: 3 December 2020 (aged 83); Houston, Texas, U.S.
- Education: Dr. Bhimrao Ambedkar University PhD Indian Statistical Institute
- Known for: Genetics; Biotechnology
- Awards: National Reserve Service Award (NRSA), U.S. National Institutes of Health, Washington D.C.; Yellapraggada Subba Rao Memorial Award, India; Nayudamma Award in Technology, India
- Scientific career
- Fields: Genetics; Biotechnology; History of Science; US-India cooperation in Science & Technology
- Workplaces: Indian Statistical Institute, India; University College, London; Johns Hopkins University Medical School, USA; University of Alberta, Canada
- Doctoral advisor: J. B. S. Haldane
- Website: www.geneticresearch.us.com

Dronamraju Krishna Rao (14 January 1937 – 3 December 2020) was an Indian-born geneticist and president of the Foundation for Genetic Research in Houston, Texas. He was born in Pithapuram, in the state of Andhra Pradesh, India. One focus of his work has been the research of his mentor J. B. S. Haldane. As an author, his name is usually rendered Krishna R. Dronamraju. He died in Houston at age 83.

== Biography ==
=== Education ===
Dronamraju went to M. R. College in Vizianagaram, Andhra University to study botany and earned a bachelor's degree in 1955. He received a master's degree from Agra University in 1957; he studied plant breeding and genetics. When J.B.S. Haldane moved to India in 1957, Dronamraju wrote to Haldane for an opportunity to pursue a research career under his direction at the Indian Statistical Institute in Calcutta.

Early in his research career, he discovered the first case of a gene on the human Y chromosome and published a paper in 1960. It was also part of his PhD thesis at the Indian Statistical Institute, Calcutta. Dronamraju's research with Haldane at the Indian Statistical Institute included many areas.

=== Research contributions ===
Dronamraju's research covered the visits of several species of lepidoptera to different colored flowers of Lantana camara reported the discovery of a species-specific pattern of color preference behavior by pollinating insects.

He did research in human genetics in India. In 1966, Dronamraju completed his PhD from the Indian Statistical Institute, Calcutta. He studied under J. B. S. Haldane. The topic of his doctoral thesis was "Genetic Studies of the Andhra Pradesh population". Dronamraju's early research in human genetics (and the independent work of L.D. Saghvi at the Tata Cancer Center in Mumbai) eventually led to the foundation of the Indian Society of Human Genetics.

Dronamraju received advanced training at University College, London and Johns Hopkins School of Medicine, followed by a postdoctoral fellowship in genetics at the University of Alberta. After he moved to the US, he continued research on inbreeding in human populations such as the Amish population in Pennsylvania in collaboration with Victor A. McKusick at Johns Hopkins. He also studied the Seneca Indians in New York State and other populations in the US and Canada.

He studied the relationship between fetal mortality and the occurrence of oral cleft defects in families.

In recent years, Dronamraju's research focused on the history of genetics and human/medical genetics. He published several books, especially with reference to the contributions of his mentor J. B. S. Haldane.

== Books ==
- "A Century of Geneticists: Mutation to Medicine", CRC Press, Taylor and Francis Company, London, UK, 2018.{ISBN/978-1-498-74866-7}
- Popularizing Science: The Life and Work of JBS Haldane. (2017) Oxford University Press ISBN 978-0-19-933392-9
- Victor McKusick and the History of Medical Genetics. (2012) Springer ISBN 978-1-4614-1676-0
- Haldane, Mayr and Beanbag Genetics (2011) Oxford University Press ISBN 978-0-19-538734-6
- What I Require from Life: Writings on Science and Life from JBS Haldane (2009) Oxford University Press ISBN 978-0-19-923770-8
- Emerging Consequences of Biotechnology (2008), World Scientific Publishing Company ISBN 978-981-277-500-9
- Genetic and Evolutionary Aspects of Malaria (2006), Springer ISBN 978-0-387-28294-7
- Infectious Disease and Host-Pathogen Evolution (2004), Cambridge University Press ISBN 978-0-521-82066-0
- Biological Wealth and Other Essays (2002), World Scientific Publishing Company ASIN B-001-T63O7-0
- Science and Society (1998), University Press of America ISBN 978-0-7618-1007-0
- Biological and Social Issues in Biotechnology Sharing (1998), Ashgate Publishing ISBN 978-1-84014-897-8
- Haldane's Daedalus Revisited (1995), Oxford University Press ISBN 978-0-19-854846-1
- The History and Development of Human Genetics in Different Countries (1993), World Scientific Publishing ISBN 978-981-02-0900-1
- If I am To Be Remembered: The Life and Work of Julian Huxley (1992), World Scientific Publishing ASIN B-001-KJODG-M
- Selected Genetic Papers of JBS Haldane (1990), Garland Science ISBN 978-0-8240-0473-6
- The Foundations of Human Genetics (1989), Charles C Thomas Pub Ltd ISBN 978-0-398-05537-0
- Cleft Lip and Palate: Aspects of Reproductive Biology (1986), Charles C Thomas Pub Ltd ISBN 978-0-398-05228-7
- Haldane: The Life and Work of JBS Haldane with special reference to India (1985), Pergamon Pr ISBN 978-0-08-032436-4
- Haldane and Modern Biology (1968), The Johns Hopkins University Press ISBN 978-0-8018-0177-8
- Haldane in India (1998)

== Achievements ==
=== Awards ===
- National Research Service Award (NRSA) from the U.S. National Institutes of Health in Washington D.C.
- Yellapraggada Subba Rao Memorial Award, India.
- Nayudamma Award in Technology, India.

=== Concurrent positions ===
- Honorary Professor, Albert Schweitzer Institute, Geneva, Switzerland
- Invited Professor, University of Paris, France
- Honorary Visiting Professor, Andhra University, India
- Honorary Research Fellow, University of London, UK.
- Chairman, International Advisory Committee, Chemtech Corp.
- Adjunct Professor, Pennsylvania State University.
- Advisor, The Science Garage, Hyderabad, India
