= Culture of Tripura =

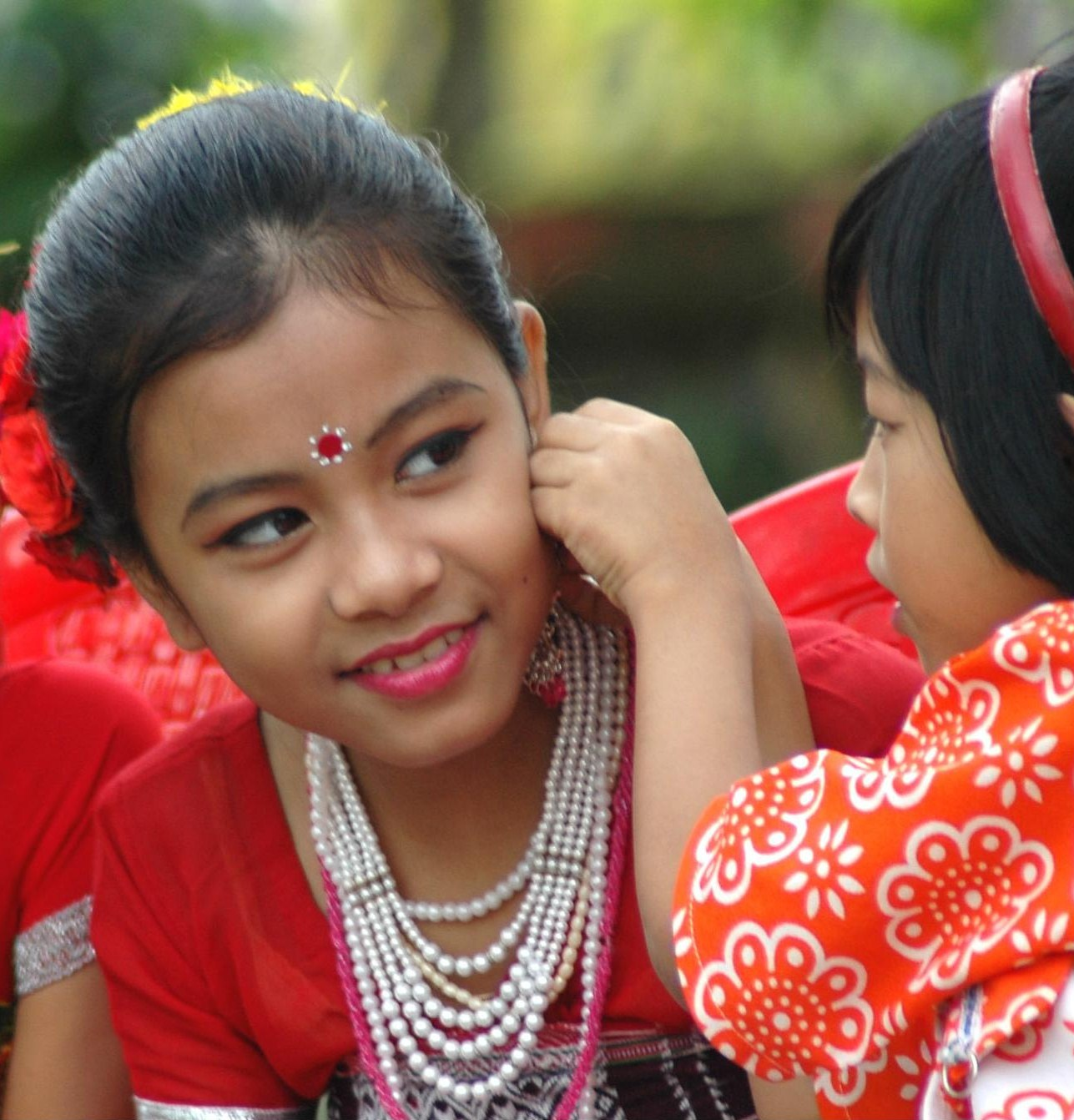
Children in Tripura prepare for a traditional dance.

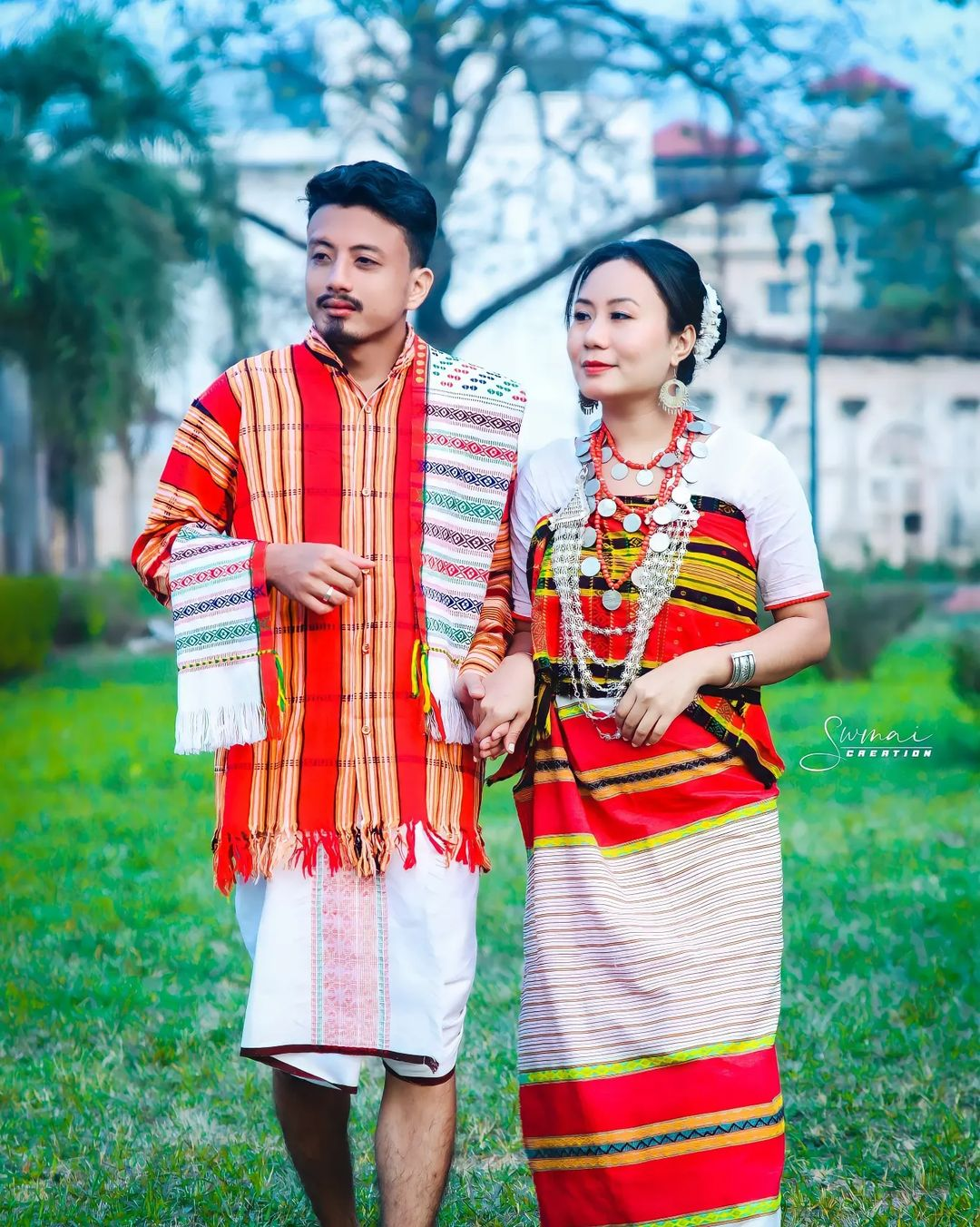
A Tripura couple in traditional attire

The culture of Tripura is distinct and a bit similar to other people of Northeast India. However like Assam, Manipur, Burma and Southeast Asia culture of Tripura is characterized in small portion where people live in plain and hill areas. Tripura is a state in North East India. In the 2001 census of India, Bengalis represented almost 70% of the population and the Tripuri population comprised 30% of Tripura's population. The Tripuri population (indigenous population) comprises some clans and ethnic groups with diverse languages and cultures. The largest native group was the Tripuri who had a population of 543,848 in 2001 census, representing 16.99% of the state population and 54.7% of the scheduled tribe population. The other group of people in order of decreasing population were Chakma (6.5%), Halam (4.8%), Mog (3.1%), Munda, Kuki tribes and Garo Hajong. Bengali is the most spoken language, due to the dominance of Bengali people in the state. Kokborok (Tripuri/Tiprakok) is a common language among Tripuris and lingua franca in Tripura. Several other languages belonging to Indo-European and Sino-Tibetan families are spoken by the different tribe

Tripura has several diverse ethno-linguistic groups, which has given rise to a composite culture. The dominant cultures are Tripuris who are: Tripura, Debbarma, Jamatia, Reang, Noatia, Koloi, Murasing, Rupini Uchoi, and tribes like Chakma, Halam, Garo, Hajong, Kuki, Mizo, Mogh, Munda, Oraon, Santhal.

== Tripuri dress ==
Tripuris have their own traditional dresses. This type of dress is similar to that of the rest of the North-East Indian people, but the pattern and design differs significantly. Below are some examples of Tripuri vestuary:

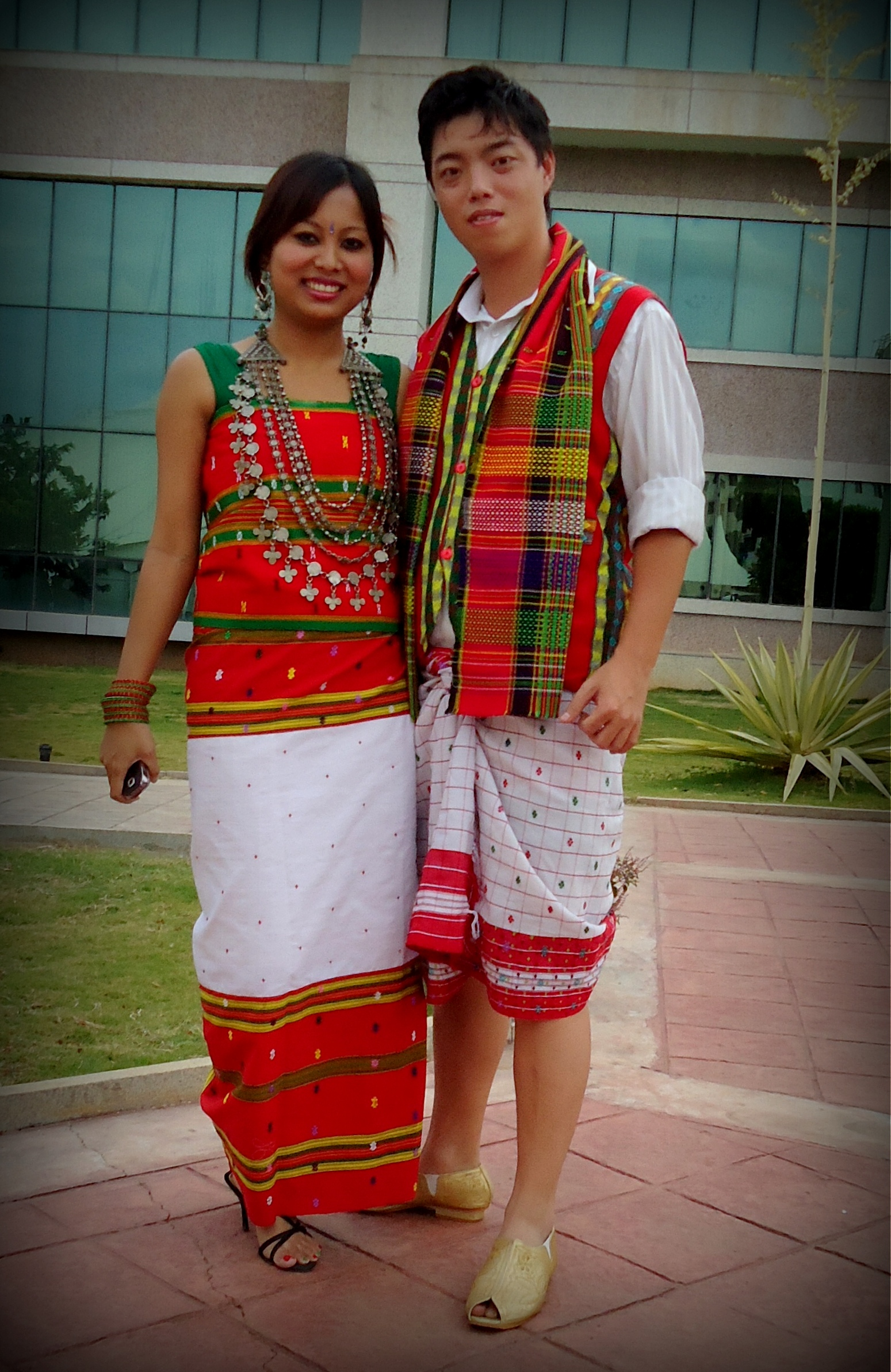

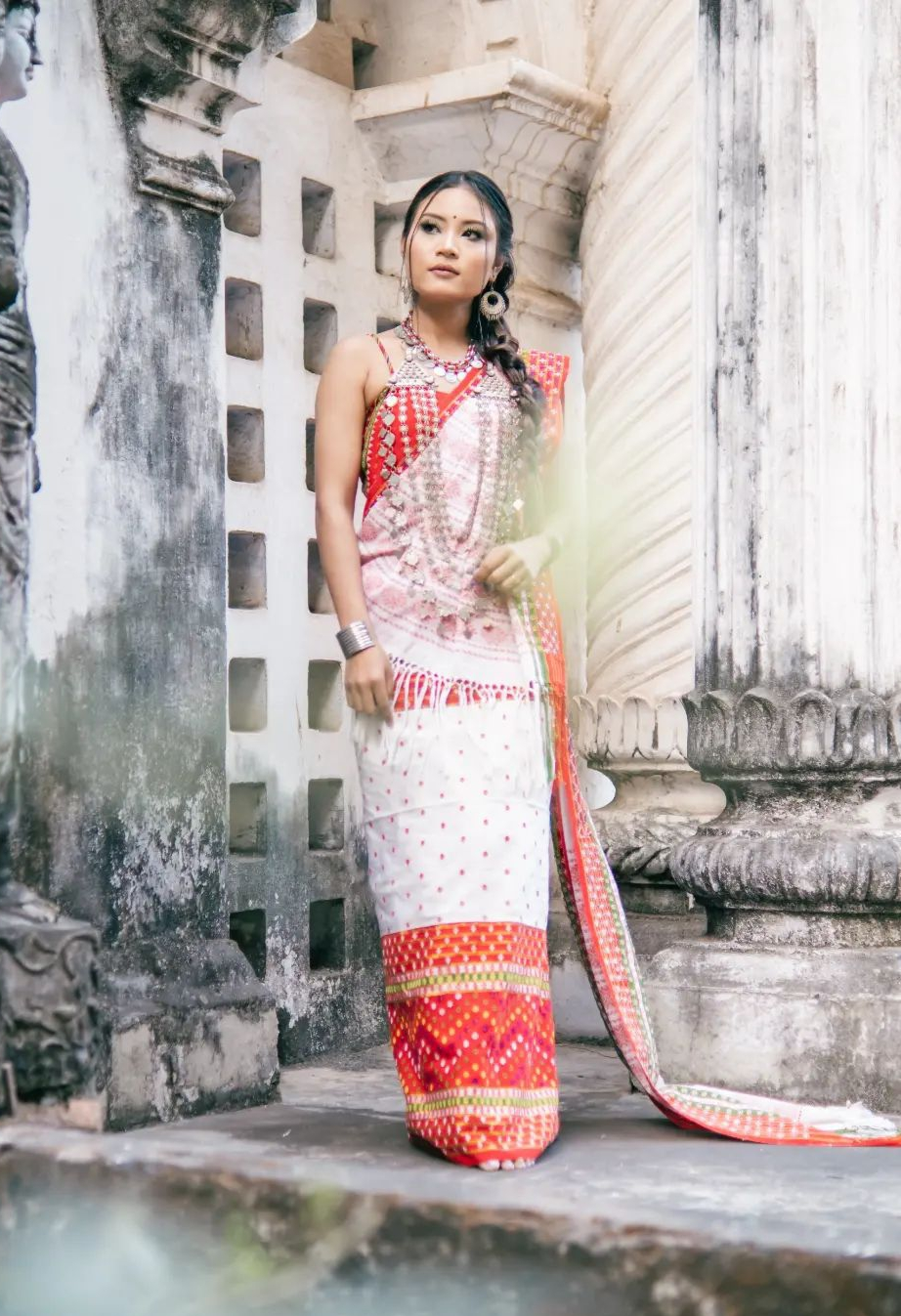

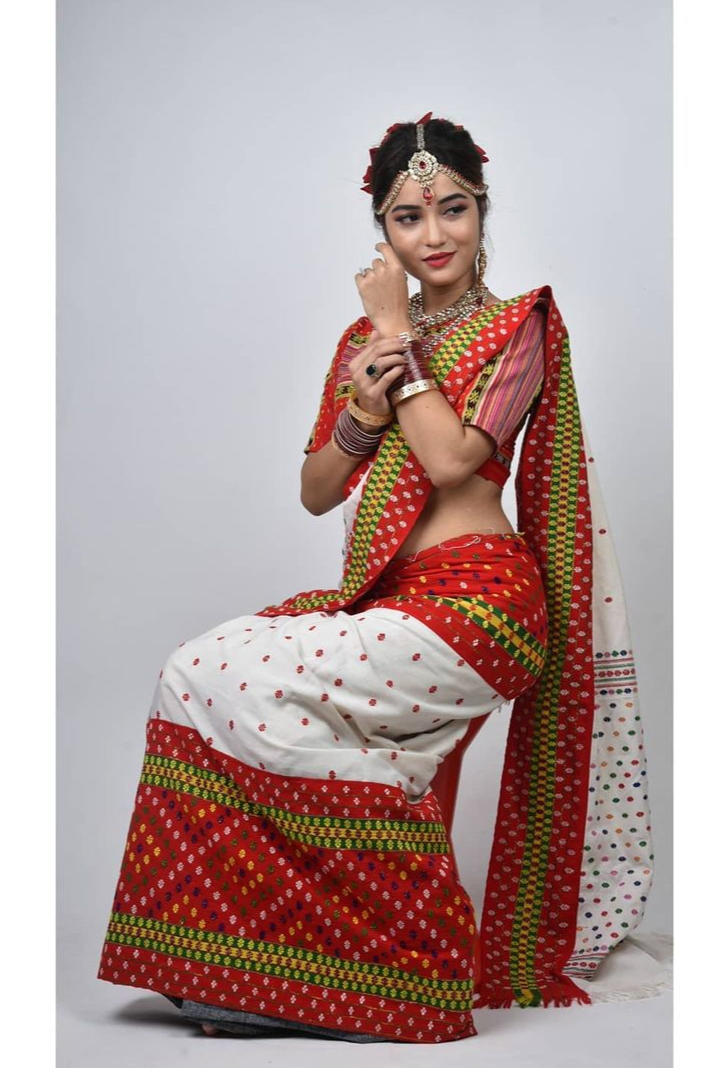

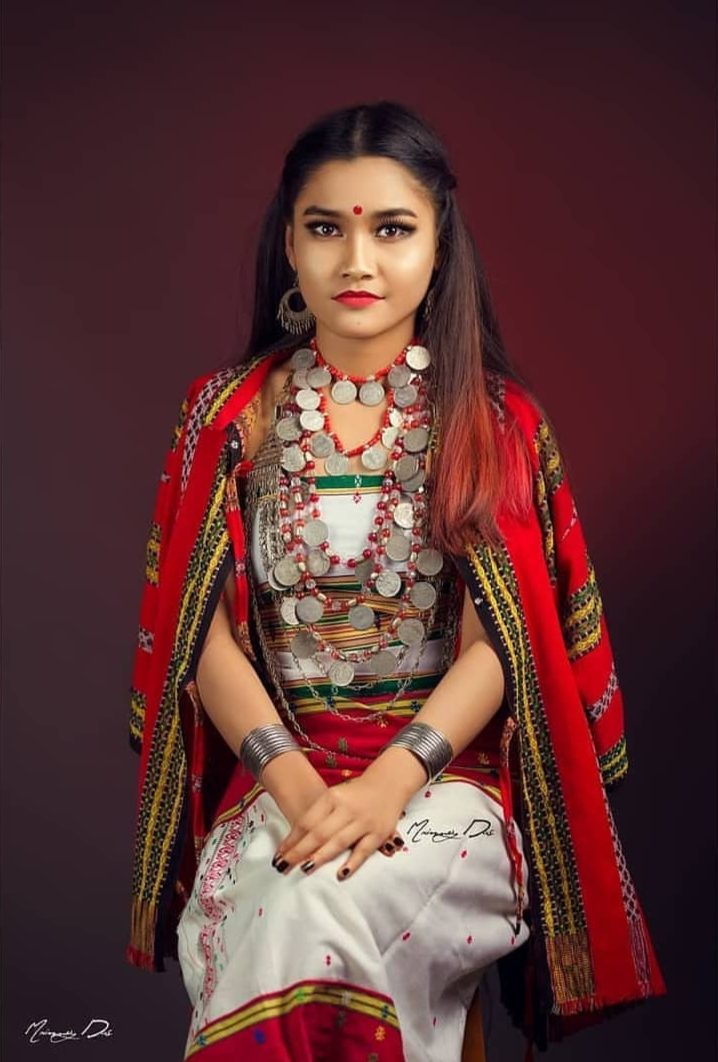

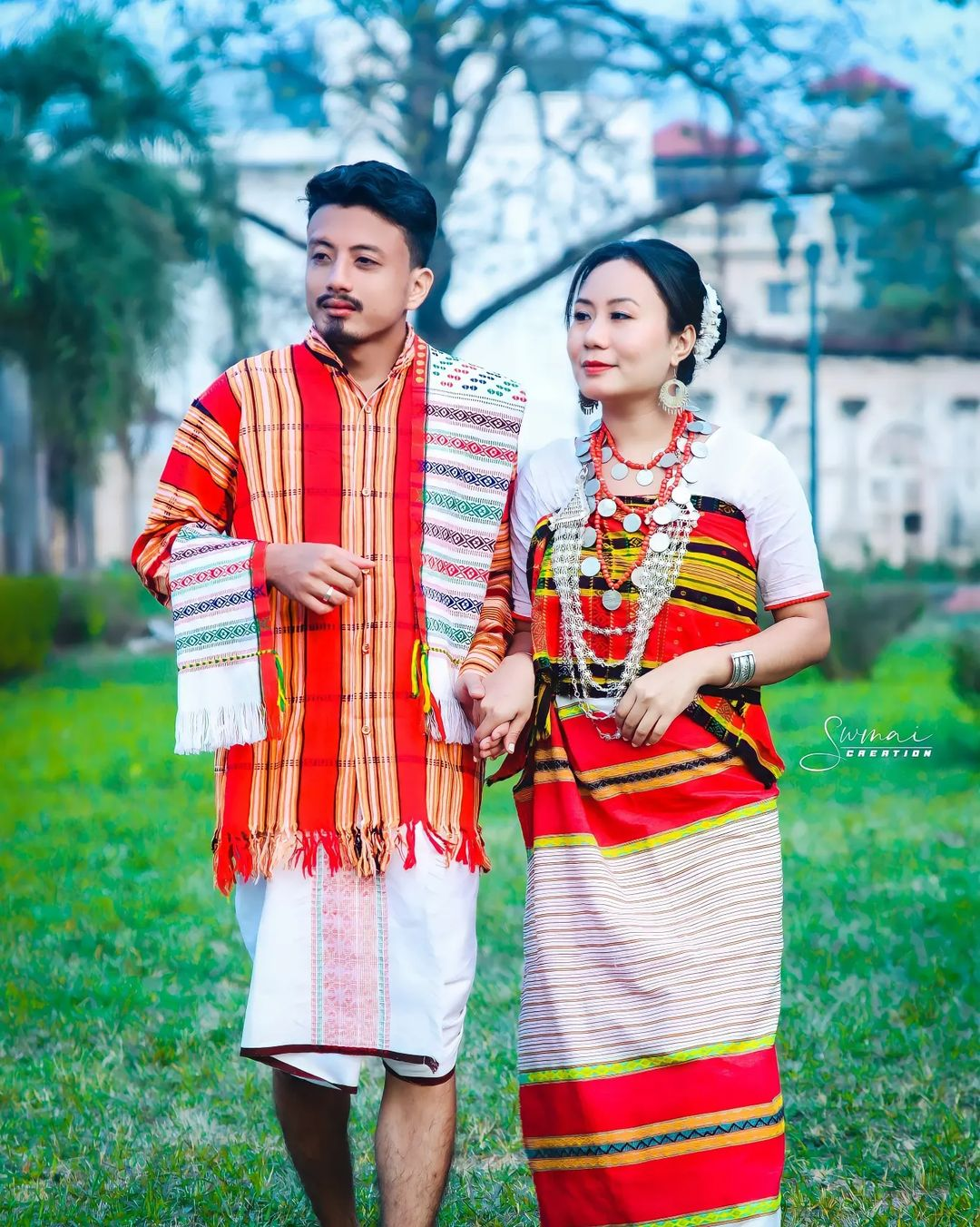

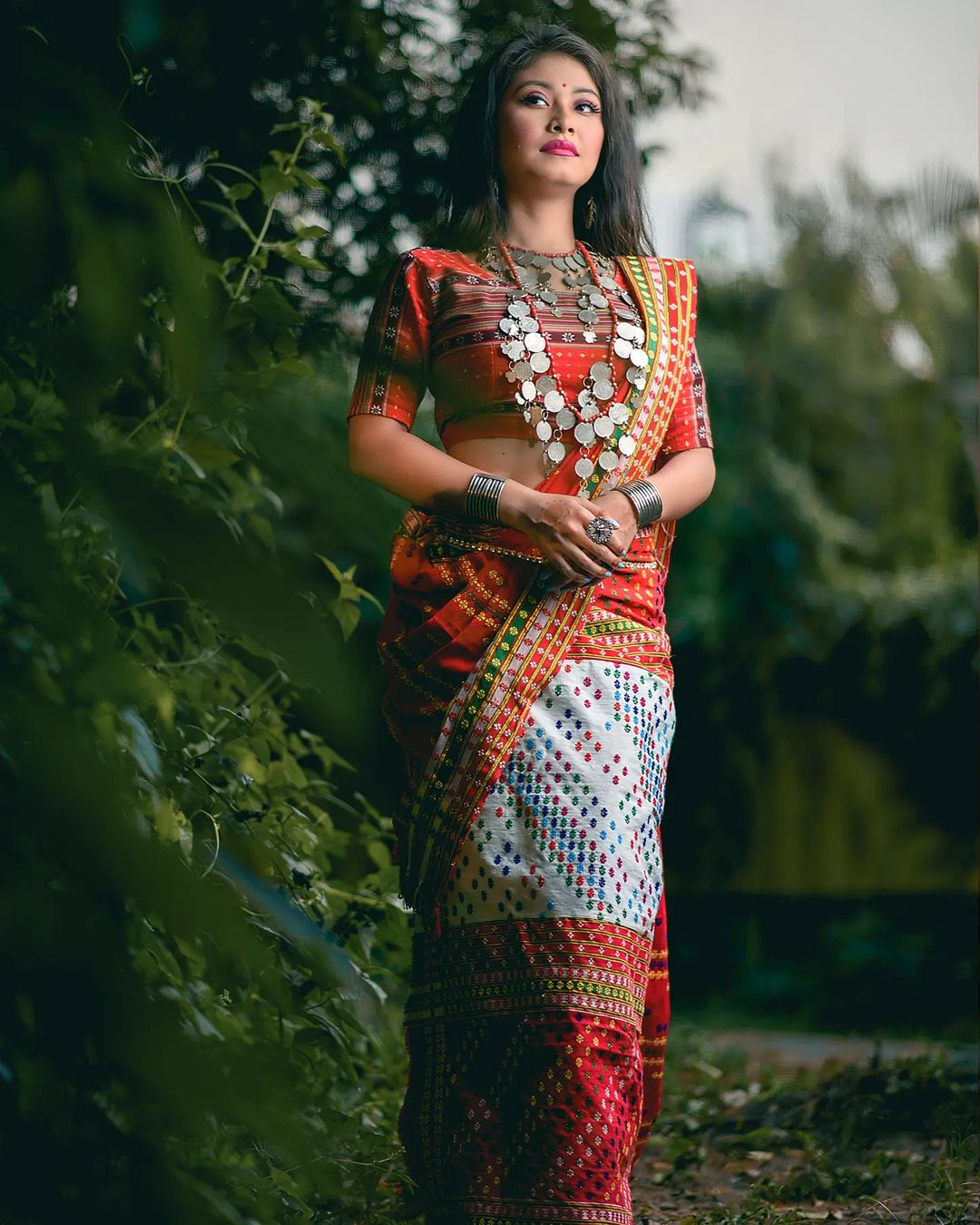

== Handicrafts ==
Tripura is noted for bamboo and cane handicrafts. Bamboo played important part in the jhumia (shifting cultivation) of the tribes. It was used to make watch stations on stilts and was devised to carry food and water. Besides these usages, bamboo, woods and cane were used to create an array of furniture, utensils, hand-held fans, replicas, mats, baskets, idols and interior decoration materials.

== Songs and dances ==
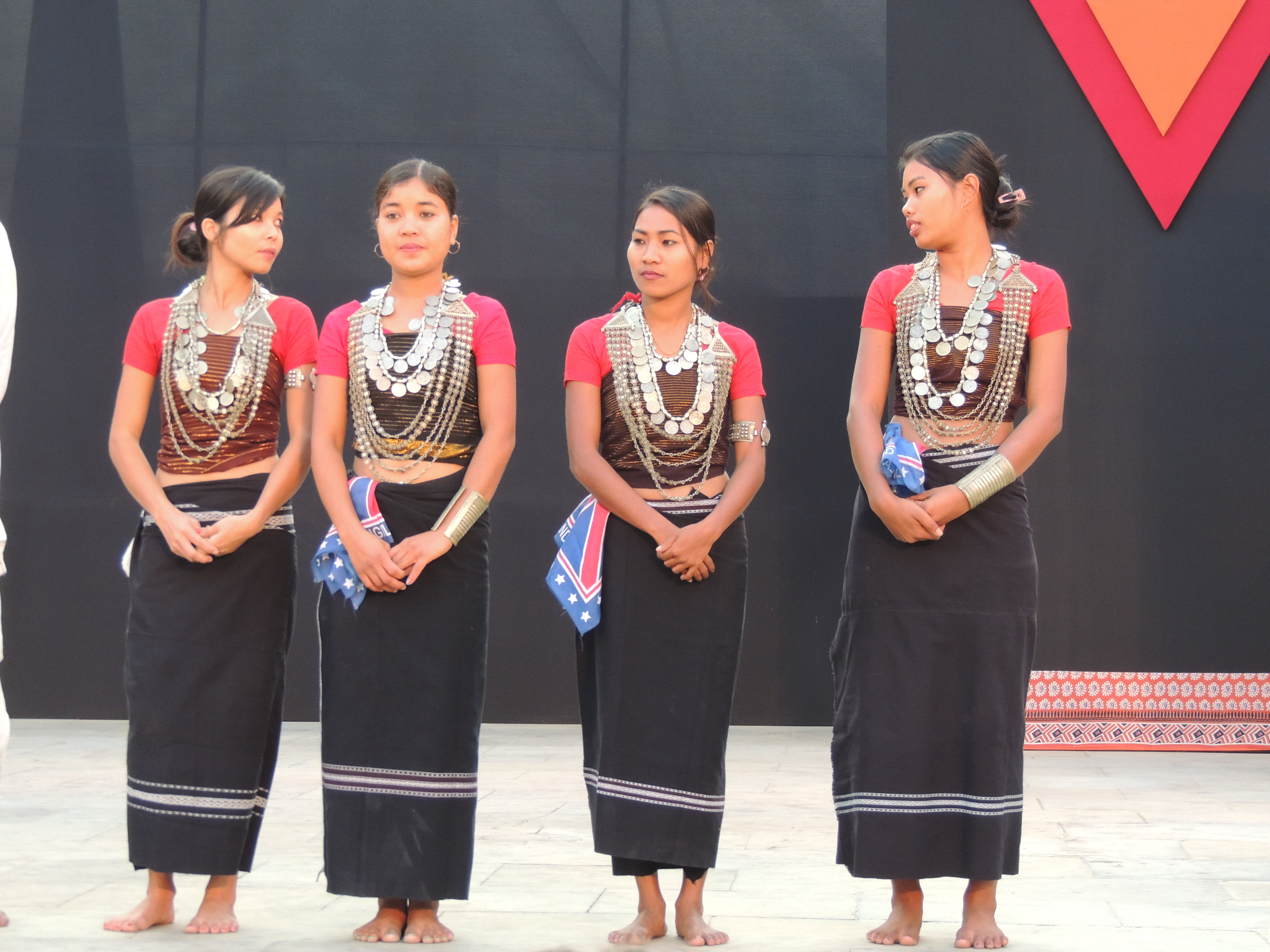
Performers getting ready to do Hojagiri dance, a dance of the Reang community

Music and dances are integral part of the tribal people of Tripura. Some of their indigenous musical instruments are the sarinda, chongpreng, and sumui (a kind of flute). Songs are sung during religious occasions, weddings, and other festivals. Each tribal community has their own repertoire of songs and dances. The Tripuri and Jamatia tribe perform goria dance during the Goria puja. Jhum dance (also called tangbiti dance) in the harvest season, lebang dance, mamita dance, and mosak sulmani dance are other Tripuri dances. Reang community, the second largest tribe of the state, are noted for their hojagiri dance performed by young girls balancing on earthen pitchers. The Bizhu dance is performed by the Chakmas during the Bizhu festival (the last day of the month of Chaitra). Other tribal dances are wangala dance of the Garo people, hai-hak dance of the Halam branch of Kuki people, sangrai dance and owa dance of the Mog tribe, and others. The Tripuri people possess a distinct tradition of folk music, including a localized style of Baul-inspired songs known as Bogla rwchapmung. Besides tribal music, Indian classical music is also practiced among the residents. Sachin Dev Burman of the royal family was a maestro in the filmi genre of Indian music, creating many popular tunes in the bollywood films.

== Festivals and worship ==
Hindus believe that Tripureshwari is the patron goddess of Tripura and an aspect of Shakti. Several fertility gods are also worshiped by the tribes, such as Lam-Para (the twin deities of sky and sea), Mailu-ma (goddess of corn, identified with Lakshmi), Khulu-ma (goddess of the cotton plant), and Burha-sa (god of healing). Durga Puja, Kali Puja, Ashokastami and the worship of the Chaturdasha deities are important festivals. Several festivals represent confluence of several tribal traditions, such as Ganga puja, Garia puja, Kherchi puja, Ker puja.

== Sculpture and architecture ==
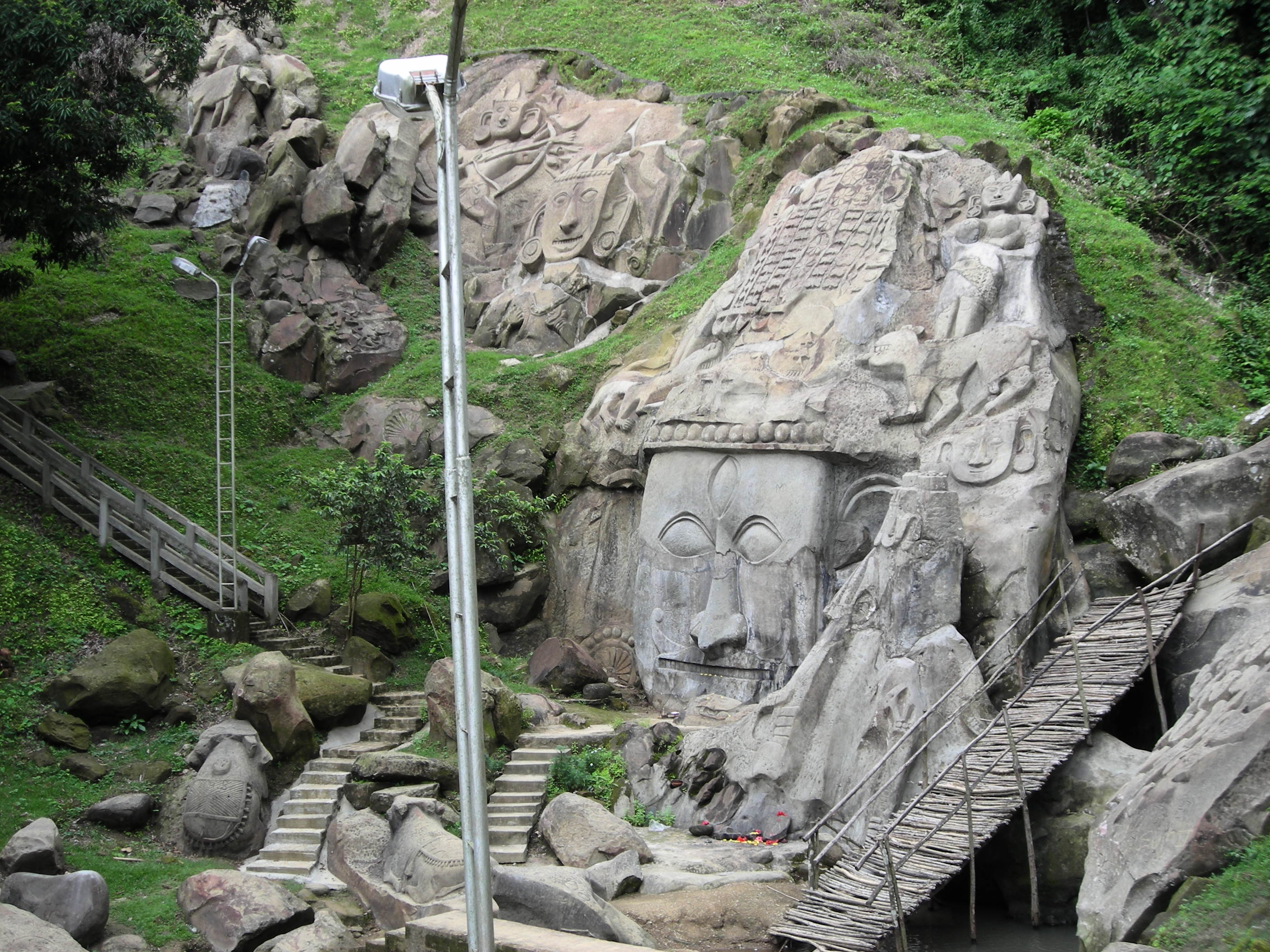
Rock sculpture in Unakoti

Unakoti, Pilak, and Devtamura are historic sites where large collections of stone carvings and rock sculptures are noted. These sculptures are evidence of the presence of Buddhism and Hindu orders for centuries. These sculptures represent a rare artistic fusion of traditional religions and tribal influence.

== Sports ==
Football and cricket are the most popular sports in the state. The state capital Agartala has its own club football championships every year where many local clubs compete in a league and knockout format. Tripura participates as an eastern state team in the Ranji Trophy, the Indian domestic cricket competition. The state also is a regular participant of the Indian National Games and the North Eastern Games. Tripura produced a few nationally successful players in gymnastics and swimming, but overall contribution in athletics, cricket, football and indoor games remained poor.

== See also ==
- Story of Python (Tripuri folktale)
