= Rangamura =

- village
- Location in Tripura, India
- Coordinates: 23.263°N 91.329°E
- Country: India
- State: Tripura

Languages
  - Official: Bengali, Kokborok, English
- Time zone: UTC+5:30 (IST)
- Vehicle registration: TR
- Website: tripura.gov.in

Rangamura is a village situated on the hills of Boromura range in Tripura, India. The populace consists of tribes like Kuki, Hrangkhawl, Koloi, Tripuri, Kaipeng and others.

It is 3 km away from Tuichindrai, the nearest point on National Highway 44. An Assam Rifles colony is being set up in Rangamura.
