= Satyaram Reang =

Indian folk performer and folk artist (1943–2023

- Born: 1943; Tripura, British Raj
- Died: 2 October 2023 (aged 80)
- Other names: Hojagiri Dance Guru
- Occupation: Folk Dance
- Known for: Hojagiri Dance
- Awards: Sangeet Natak Akademi Award (1986); Padma Shri (2021)

Satyaram Reang (1943 – 2 October 2023) was an Indian folk performer and folk artist from Tripura. He was noted for his significant contribution to Hojagiri Dance. In January 2021, he was awarded India's fourth-highest civilian award the Padma Shri in the Arts category. After Thanga Darlong and Benichandra Jamatia, Satyaram Reang became the third renowned person from the indigenous Tripuri community of Tripura to receive such a prestigious award. Reang was also conferred with the Sangeet Natak Akademi Award in 1986.

Satyaram Reang died on 2 October 2023, at the age of 80.

== Awards and recognition ==
- Sangeet Natak Akademi Award from Sangeet Natak Akademi, (1986)
- Padma Shri from Government of India, (2021)

== See also ==
- List of Padma Shri award recipients (2020–2029)
