= Story of Python =

Tripuri folktale

Story of Python, originally titled Meislesani Kereng Koktwoma and sourced from the Kalai people, is an Indian folktale collected in Tripura, Northeastern India, about the secret affair between a girl and a python, his killing by her father, and the creation of a river by the girl's drowning in water. As the tale continues, the girl's younger sister survives and marries a king, gives birth to a group of siblings, but is tricked by the king's wicked co-wives.

The second part of the tale is classified in the Aarne-Thompson-Uther Index as tale type ATU 707, "The Three Golden Children". These tales refer to stories where a girl promises a king she will bear a child or children with wonderful attributes, but her jealous relatives or the king's wives plot against the babies and their mother. Many variants of the tale type are registered in India, although they comprise specific cycles in this country.

== Summary ==
In this tale, a man named Sardeng Singh, also called Sardeng Achai, has two daughters. They live in a tong and work in their jhum fields. Since he cannot pay the rit, the rain drips through their roof during rainy season. One day, his elder daughter promises to marry anyone who can fix their tong house. The next morning, they find the roof repaired, and discover the one that did it was a python. The elder sister fulfills the vow and marries the python, and asks her younger sister to invite the snake for a feast. This goes on for some time, until one day the elder sister, the python's human lover, is working at another jhum field, and Sardeng learns from his youngest his elder's dalliance with the animal, and goes to the jhum field to kill it. He orders his youngest to call for her brother-in-law (kumui): the python appears to them and he cuts off its head. The head rolls over to a lunga (a type of valley), while Sardeng takes the body to his house for his daughter to cook it. After they feast on the snake, they save some for the elder daughter, who comes home with a strange feeling of grief.

The pair of sisters returns to the jhum field and the younger calls on the python, but it does not answer. The elder sister begins to call for him with a melancholy voice, and tries frantically to search for her lover. She finds a stream filled with many khumpui flowers, where her father threw the python's head. The elder sister plucks a flower and places it in her ear, then begins to sing a song and gradually sinks into the river, believing that her husband is in the water. The younger sister cries for her elder abandoning her, but the girl says the cadette can find a six-branched banyan tree on the road where she can find shelter, which she is to climb and say she is beautiful and fit to be queen, then a king will marry her. The cadette does as instructed, while the elder sinks into the river and finds a palace there with her husband. Back to the cadette, she climbs the tree and is found by a passing bindias (royal hill force). The king takes the youngest sister and marries her.

Months later, she becomes pregnant, to the jealousy of the king's other queens. While the king is away on a hunt, the co-queens blindfold her with seven folds and arrange her labour near a stream. Helpless to do anything, the new queen gives birth to six sons and a daughter, who the co-queens replace for woods and stones and throw in the river. After the king returns, the co-queens trick him into believing his new queen is a witch, orders for her nose and ear to be cut off and banishes her from the palace to take care of goats in the jungle. As for the children, their aunt, who is living with her husband down in the river, rescues her nephews and niece and raises them. Years later, the girls from a nearby village come to fetch water from the stream, when they discover their earthen pots are broken. They inform the king, who sets up a boat racing contest in the stream. The river-aunt tells her nephews of the event and the siblings attend the contest. The king is there also, notices the children and goes to touch them. The children rebuff him, and say they are princes and a princess. The king takes the septet to the palace and bids them identify their mother. The children say their mother is the one grazing the goats. The king brings her back, and the children tell their whole story. The king learns of the co-queens' conspiracy and punishes them, then restores the children's mother as his wife. The king divides the kingdom into seven parts, each for one of his children. The tale explains this land is ancient Tripura, the Gumati river the place where the elder sister lives with her python husband, and the Dombur a sacred shrine.

== Publication ==
The tale was also translated as Sacred River, and Seven kingdoms for seven siblings, and sourced from the Koloi.

== Analysis ==
=== Tale type ===
According to Stith Thompson's and Jonas Balys's index of Indian tales, the tale type ATU 707 shows 44 variants across Indian sources. Researcher Noriko Mayeda and Indologist W. Norman Brown divided Indian variants of type 707 in five groups: (1) quest for wonderful items; (2) reincarnation into flowers; (3) use of wooden horses; (4) children sing a song; (5) miscellaneous.

In the joint work of folklorists Stith Thompson and Warren Roberts, Types of Indic Oral Tales, in some variants of type 707, there are two girls lost in the jungle: a king finds one and marries her, and the other becomes the children's rescuer later in the story.

=== Interpretation ===
The story functions as an etiological tale for the origin of the Tripura state. According to Bengali scholarship, it reveals aspects of Tripura social life, namely, the cultivation of jhum as their main livelihood, and the work of both men and women in the fields.

=== Motifs ===
According to Stith Thompson and Jonas Balys study of motifs of Indian literature and oral folklore, the tale contains the motifs N 711.1., Prince finds maiden in woods and marries her; and S 451., "Outcast wife united with husband and children".

A motif that appears in the Indian variants is that, in the conclusion of the tale, jets of breastmilk flow from the children's biological mother, the disgraced queen, confirming their blood relation.

== Variants ==
According to Bengali scholarship, the story is a popular tale in Tripura. In the same vein, according to professor Suparna Saha, while some tales have a similar narrative core, they have different versions in different villages of the Tripura state, like the story Khumpui, which appears across North Tripura and South Tripura.

=== Khumpai Bāruru ===
In a tale from Tripura with the title The Khumpai flower (Khumpai Bāruru), in a village in Tripura, an Acai, a priest (or Achāiung, in another translation), has two daughters. Both daughters go to the jum field and eat food at noon. One day, the sky becomes overcast with storm clouds. Fearing for their lives, the elder sister promises to marry whoever helps them. A snake appears and builds them a shelter, then vanishes into the jungle. The two sisters take shelter and wait for the storm to pass, then return home. The next day, the elder sister chooses to remain true to her word, and her younger sister invites the snake to share their food. This goes on for some time, until their parents notice the girls looking slimmer and discover the incident. The father goes with the younger sister and kills the snake. The next time both sisters go to meet the snake, the elder finds out that the snake was killed and follows its usual path to a precipice. She finds the head of the dead snake and a Khumpai flower nearby. As she stands near the flower, a gush of water begins to flood a waterfall and drowns the elder sister - forming the Gomati river. As the elder sister drowns, she tells her younger sister not to cry over her, since the snake was a god; and she advises her to wander to a crossing of seven paths, climb a banyan tree with a loom on top, and proclaims she will become queen. The younger sister goes to the seven paths, finds a golden loom inside and earns her living by spinning, weaving and selling her exquisite designs. One day, Raja Subrai of Tripura announces he will marry the girl whose clothe will be judged excellent. Many candidates try, but in the end the king chooses the "lady of the tree" (the younger sister) as his new queen. The girl cries tears of joy and creates the Haora river. Raja Subrai is already married to other queens. When the newest queen gives birth to their children (in seven consecutive pregnancies), the co-queens replace the children for animals (the first son for a toad) and cast them in the Gomati river. Raja Subrai, tricked by the jealous queens, exiles her from the palace. As for the children, the seven brothers are rescued by their aunt and raised in the river. After some time, the seven brothers decide to take revenge on the queens: they go to a ghàt and break the jars of the queens' maidservants. As soon as he situation escalates, the king and a crowd assemble to solve the altercation. The exiled queen is brought to them and the seven brothers leave the river castle to embrace their parents, and the co-queens are executed.

=== Chibuksane (The Snake) ===
In another tale sourced from the Rupinis of Tripura with the title Chibuksane (The Snake), an ojha (witch-doctor) has many houses and two daughters that work in the jhum fields. On one hot day, the elder sister wants to have a protection from the sun (a tong ghar) and will marry anyone that can make it, even a snake. While the younger sister goes to make water and returns, she sees a snake next to her sister and despairs, but the elder sister explains the animal is her kumoi (brother-in-law) who made her the tong ghar. The younger sister goes back home and tells her father about the marriage with the snake. The ojha goes to meet the snake son-in-law, kills it with a dao and throws the remains in a cherra (streamlet). The elder sister goes to look for her snake husband, when a little bird sings that Kumoi is dead. She follows the bird to the streamlet and finds a bed of khumpoi flowers nearby, whose root she pulls up and discovers the snake's remains. In her grief, she wishes for the streamlet to become a lake and the flowers spread as a tribute to the snake. It happens thus, and the elder sister drowns. Back to the younger sister, the girl discovers her elder dies and mourns for her loss, when the elder sister's voice tells her to climb up a tree with seven branches where seven roads meet; up there she will find a Charkha (spinning wheel), which she is to use for she will marry the king, she predicts. The younger sister follows her elder's instructions, climbs up the tree and spins on the wheel, while singing that she wants to marry the king and bear him seven boys. The king learns of this and takes the ojha's younger daughter as his wife. In time, she becomes pregnant with seven boys, and, while the king is away, she cannot find a place to give birth to her children. Eventually, she goes to the edge of the lake and gives birth to her seven children. The boys fall in the water and are saved by their aunt, who is living in the lake with her husband. The girl returns to the palace and places stones in her children's place to trick the king, but he discovers he ruse and punishes his wife. Back to the children, they are alive and grow up in the lake. One day, they sail boats to their father's ghat to sing verses about their mother, then dive back into the lake. The king is told about the event and goes to confront the seven boys, asking them about their mother. The boys reply they will tell him after the king brings them their mother. Every woman is brought to the lake, but none is their mother. Finally, their mother appears and drops seven drops of her breastmilk on the water. On this, the boys come out of the water.

=== Khumphoibarukma ===
In a Tripuri tale sourced to the Riang people with the title Khumphoibarukma or Khumphoibarukma Riang Krinkoutma Payha, two sisters work in their jhum fields, the elder marries a snake after the animal brings them a bit of fire to warm them. The girls' father discovers the illicit affair and kills the snake while the elder daughter is away from the jhum fields. Some time later, the elder girl goes to meet her snale husband on their designated spot, and, noticing his tardiness, asks her younger sister if she brought him his meal. The younger sister knows the snake is dead, however. Suddenly, a dog barks and points to a bed of blood coloured khumphoi flowers near to some water that is flowing from underground. The elder sister calls for her husband in tears, as the water flow increases to the point it washes her away with the strong stream. The younger sister watches the whole scene from afar and cries for her vanishes elder sister. After a long while, some of the king's troops on a ferry boat spot her near the river and take her with them to be their king's newest wife, since the king wanted a son and none of his six co-queens had any luck. The king marries the girl as his seventh co-wife and dotes on her, to the jealousy of the other six. In time, she becomes pregnant, and the king leaves the palace to buy a Rangjak Oiyen ('cradle made of gold') for his first child, despite the pregnant queen's fears about the others. After the king leaves, the queens give their newest member a yastyam (a magic ring) that can summon the king from wherever he is. To test the ring's powers, she throws it on the ground and the king appears. She does it again twice more, and the king says he will not appear any longer. Some time later, when the king is buying the cradle, the pregnant queen begins to feel labour pains and tries to summon the king to her side, to no avail. Plotting to get rid of their rival, since she would be the king's favourite, the co-queens trick her, put a blindfold in her eyes and order the maidservants to beat drums to silence the baby's cries, pretending this is customary in their kingdom. The queen gives birth to six boys and a girl, whom the co-queens slay and replace for bamboo shoots, then mock her for the delivery. The king comes back with the golden cradle, learns of the "birth" of the bamboo shoots and orders his queen to be banished, after having her ears, nose, hair and breasts cut off. The babies' remains are thrown in the Gomati river, while the disgraced queen, renamed Takhambeingyamo ('a woman that looks after the ducks') moves out to a hut in the forest to look after the ducks. As for the babies, their remains are retrieved by their aunt, Khumphoibarukma, who raises them in the river and feeds them with milk. Seven months later, the king's sentries, on a hunt in the forest, begin to listen to some voices coming from a tree, and find six boys up a tree and a girl singing about making turbans to her brothers. The sentries return to the palace to inform their king, and the monarch sends other group to confirm the story. The third time, the king himself decides to see the children by himself, and he goes to the jungle, but the children hide from him. The king, not finding the children, decides to wait under the tree in some sort of ascetic mood (not eating, no talking, and remaining still), causing the children to feel sorry for their father. A boy appears and tells the king to bring them their mother. The king agrees to do it, but cannot know who is the mysterious children's mother, thus he brings the six co-queens, whom the children deny, then summons for every woman in the land, who all have the same luck. Finally, the king orders his noseless, hairless former queen to be brought there. It is done so, and the children recognize their mother, but reproach the forceful way she has been brought. The king orders his soldiers to treat her gently, and the children, hiding in the tree, rejoice that their mother is with them. A golden ladder appears before the tree and the queen climbs it to be with her children, her body restored to full health. The king then asks how he can regain his family, and the children request him to kill the six co-queens, explaining they were the ones responsible for their misfortune. The children's request is carried out, the king takes a bath in the river, and the children and their mother appear at the foot of the tree. The royal family is reunited at last, and the king learns the river Gomati is his sister-in-law, and he should respect a "rule of avoidance" on it - which the Tripuri kings follow to this day.

=== Khumpui (Reang) ===
In a Reang tale translated to Bengali as খুমপুই or খুম্পুই ("Khumpui"), a woman named Touthukiongma lives with her husband and her two daughters. One day, she dies; the man goes to work elsewhere, while the girls work in the jhum fields and return home in the evening. One day, they find their hut near the jhum fields destroyed after a storm, which precludes them from taking cover in stormy, rainy or sunny weather. The elder sister then makes a vow to marry whoever makes them a new hut, be they a snake, Sindra, or human. A large snake overhears them and appears to them, and orders a piece of bamboo to magically transform into a hut. It happens thus, and the elder sister marries the snake. From then on, the sisters go to the jhum and the elder asks the cadette to summon the snake brother-in-law "Jamaibabu", saying that his rice and water are ready. She calls him seven times, and the snake appears to them. Their father returns after some time, notices his daughters look emaciated and questions them. The elder goes away and he forces the younger sister to explain the situation: the elder promised to marry whoever built them a hut near the jhum, the younger summons him and he eats the rice. Their father doubts the reality of the situation, but takes a dao and decides to kill the snake. One day, the elder sister is attending a ceremony at the Kaskau king's house, who is making Maikhulumma Puja, and the father tells his younger he will go to the jhum to kill the snake. The younger sister mentions that her sister will not want that, but he forcefully takes her to the jhum and forces her to summon the snake. The father beheads the snake and buries its head in the garden. Meanwhile, the elder sister senses something wrong with her husband and quickly makes a turn home. She questions her cadette whether she fed her snake husband correctly, but the girl deflects the question. The elder sister then takes some rice and water, goes to the jhum and summons the snake seven times, but he does not appear. The elder sister returns home and mentions her husband's absence to her cadette, who faints. The younger sister comes to and is asked about why she fainted, then joins the elder and a dog. They find the snake's head. The elder sister bids her cadette returns to be with their father, for she will stay with her husband. She then keeps singing, and the snake's blood keeps rising until it drowns the girl completely and she submerges.

The cadette cries to her elder, wanting her sister not to leave her alone. However, she stays like that for the whole day. A king that is on a hunt finds her and asks her what is the matter. The girl tells him everything, and he takes her to his kingdom, marrying her next. However, the king already has six co-queens, who are childless. One day, the seventh wife becomes pregnant and he dotes on her even more, to the jealousy of the six co-queens. They plot together how to ruin their rival. One day, the king gives a thread to the younger queen to pull to let him know if she is in trouble. The eldest co-queen pulls the thread and the king rushes to the seventh queen's room. She admits that she did not pull the thread. The king leaves in anger. Later, the seventh queen is ready to give birth and pulls the king's thread, but he does not come. Instead, the six co-queens approach her and trick her, taking her to the riverbank and placing seven blindfolds on her. The seventh queen gives birth to six boys and a girl, who the co-queens place in the water, then tell the king she gave birth to pieces of wood and bamboo. The king believes their deceit, cuts the seventh queen's hair and banishes her from the palace. As for the children, their aunt, who lives in water, rescues them and raises them underwater, and the siblings go to the ghat. One day, the king goes to bathe at the ghat and notices the children, sensing a connecting to them, since they would be the children he would have had. He orders the water to be drained so that he can find the children, but they are not there. Months later, the king returns to bathe and notices the children. The siblings realize the king is there and quickly dive underwater. The king orders the river to be damed so he can find the children. However, he does not find the siblings. Months later, the children grow up and go play under a banyan tree. The female sibling is up a tree, spinning and singing a song. Some soldiers hear the commotion and report to the king about the girl atop the tree. The king goes to check on the scene. The girl keeps asking in the form of her song for her and her siblings' mother to be brought before her. The king brings in everyone, but the girl does not react to any of them. The king then sends for the disgraced queen (whose name is given as "তথকিওমা" 'Tathaqioma' in this part of the text). As soon as the disgraced queen comes, the girl comes down the tree and suckles on the queen's breasts, proving their relationship. The king understands that the seven siblings are his children and takes them back with their mother. The tale was collected from an elderly Riang informant named Dwjendra Riang.

=== Khumpui Barrukruk (Story of the Python Snake) ===
In a Tripuri tale titled খুম্পুই বাররুকৃক (অজগর সাপের গল্প) ("Khumpui Barrukruk (Story of the Python Snake)"), a poor Achai (sorcerer) has two daughters who work in the jumma fields every day. However, there is no tent or roof for the girls at the jumma fields, which causes them to get wet during rainy season and their food to be spoiled. One day, the elder sister tells the younger that she will marry one that builds them a shelter. The goddess of the forest builds them the shelter, and a python is lying on the roof. The elder sister decides to marry the python, since it was her promise. Some time later, the elder sister bids the younger call out for the python husband for his meal, but she is afraid. Still, she calls out for her brother-in-law ("sister's groom"). This continues on for days. Eventually, the younger sister tells her father about the illicit liaison, and in once occasion when the elder is busy working in another field, the sorcerer goes with her to kill the draw out the python and kill it. The man cooks and serves the python's flesh to his family, but the elder sister feels there is something amiss and worries about her python husband. The following morning, she goes with her sister and tries to call her husband. She approaches a rivulet where some khumpui flowers are blooming, the same canal where the girls' father threw the python's cecapitated head. The elder places a flower in her hair, but it dries up, so she thinks her husband is in the water, so she slowly dives in, singing for the flower to bloom, for she is joining her husband in the water. Down there, she finds her husband at some palace doors and reunites with him. As for her younger sister, a local king finds and marries her. The king's co-wives decide to destroy the newcomer: when she gives birth to seven boys and a girl, they take the children and throw them in water, they say the girl is a rakshasa (a demoness), so the king banishes her from the palace. As for the children, they are raised in the water by their aunt, and throw pebbles at people's pitchers when they are trying to fetch water. The king hears about this, and goes to investigate: he sees the children sailing on boats. When he tries to approach them, the children dive along with the boat. The king tries many times, and the children avoid the king's approach, and say they will recognize their mother by the woman that fills up their bellies with milk. The women come to fill the children's bellies, to no avail. Lastly, the disgraced queen comes and fills her children's bellies with her breastmilk. The king realizes these are his children, retakes his former queen and punishes the other co-wives. The tale is described to be "a popular" fairy tale in Tripura, and interpreted to hark back to ideas of totemism.

=== The Tale of Gomati ===
In a Tripuri tale published by author Prabhangshu Tripura and translated to Bengali with the title "গোমতীর উপাখ্যান" ("The Tale of Gomati"), a king named Parachi rules the Tripura Kingdom. In a village named Kaiskak, located at the foot of the Langtarai mountain, a priest named Dangui Chottai has two beautiful daughters, Gomati and Kasmati. After their mother dies, Dangui Chottai raises them and works in the jhum plantation. In time, both girls work in the fields instead of their father, while their father makes puja in the houses of the village. The girls do not have a gyring (tong house), a type of shelter for them near the jhum fields to protect them from hot and rainy weather. In one day of heavy rain, Gomati complains that she has had enough, and vows to marry anyone to build a gyring for them, be it a Yaksha-Raksha, a Daita, a demon, or whoever. Gomati's words are heard by a forest god who falls in love with Gomati and builds a gyring with his magic powers, then takes on a python form and sleeps near the shelter. The sisters are surprised to see the gyring, and Gomati takes Kasmati to the shelter to warm themselves. They see the python snake and scream, but the forest god assures them not to be afraid, and explains he fulfilled Gomati's vow, so she should uphold hers. Gomati lives with the snake, who slithers to his cave in the morning and spends his nights at the shelter. Kasmati fears the snake and avoids eating her share of their food, while Gomati is deeply in love with her python lover. Gomati asks Kasmati to summon her brother-in-law with a secret command in verses, for him to eat rice and water she leaves for him. Kasmati spends months worried and afraid, until one day in the month of Ashwin, their father notices that his daughters are dry; Gomati omits the story about her python lover, but Kasmati tells everything about not touching the food due to him. Dangui Chotta plans something regarding his python son-in-law during the festival during the full moon. Gomati goes to Naran's house, leaving her husband unattended, so Dangui Chotta and Kasmati go to the jhum fields, Kasmati summons the python after two failed attempts, and Dangui Chotta kills him, chops the body in seven pieces, throws the head in water, and returns home. Suddenly, Gomati feels something terrible has happened, since her dress and ornaments fall from her body, then leaves the puja festival in tears to the jhum fields, where she finds her sister Kasmati alone. She tries to look for him in the cave, and even calls for him to come eat his food, to no avail. She questions Kasmati about it, who remains silent, when her dog pulls her to the fountain where the python body is, red with blood. Gomati starts to cry nonstop, until her tears form a river and she slowly sinks in the water. Kasmati sees her sister's reaction and fears for both of them drowning in water, but Gomati says she does not wish to live anymore, and advises her sister to go to the southern edge of the kingdom, climb up a banyan tree near the Tepantar field, where she is to live by eating the fruitd and singing that she can give birth to seven children, so that the local king "Binandiya" team (bird hunters) overhear her words.

Gomati drowns in water and creates the Gomati River. As for Kasmati, she does as instructed and lives atop the tree, while she sings about being a special woman that can bear seven children. Two bird hunters of the king's retinue overhear her words during a hunt and report to the king about the strange, beautiful woman with beautiful singing voice atop the tree. The king becomes fascinated with this woman and wishes to meet her, then rewards the two bird hunters. After three days, the king goes to hear Kasmati's words and falls in love with her, listens to her verses and promises to make her his queen. However, the king was already married to six co-queens, who become jealous of Kasmati, who they see as their rival. In time, Kasmati becomes pregnant, to the co-queens' despair. Pretending to look after Kasmati, they make Kasmati ring a golden chain to call the king every day until he becomes tired of answering empty calls and leaves her be. They blindfold Kasmati during labour, and she gives birth to six boys and a girl, whom the elder co-queen throws in the river and replaces for pieces of wood. The elder co-queen accuses Kasmati of being a witch. The king falls for the trick and orders his soldiers to banish her; Kasmati begins to live in a hut by the lake. Gomati, who drowned and became the river, rocks her niece and nephews with a song, which is heard nearby by the priest of the temple. People start to believe it is a witch and the rumour spreads to the king, who investigates into the matter, with no concret results. After seven years, people begin to see six boys playing in the sandbanks while a girl is weaving next to them. The king's soldiers try to capture them, but Gomati's voice warns them and they flee into the water. The king gets news of this and pitches a tent to see it for himself. Gomati's voice in the river tells the children that their father, the foolish king, has come, and the siblings jump into the water. The king orders for a dam to be built, but the children escape downstream. When the king tries to have a dam built downstream, the children jump upstream. A voice comes from the river saying that the royal children will be by the banyan tree, and if the king can make them happy, they will belong to him. The entire court flock to the banyan tree near Tepantar fields to witness the event, as the king pleads his case to the children about being childless. The girl, answering for her brothers, asks him to bring their mother, for they will tie a clothe around their faces, and they hope their mother's breastmilk will flow to their mouths. The king brings in the co-queens, and the girl says their mother is not there. Thus the monarch keeps bringing in women and females from every corner of the kingdom, every profession and tribe, yet none is recognized as the mother of the children. An old man mentions the forgotten Kasmati, who has become a duck-herder, and the king asks for her to be brought in. They send for Kasmati, who is in a sorry state of malnutrition and head lice, but milk flows from her through the cloth and the girl recognizes Kasmati as her mother. The children climb down the banyan tree and embrace their mother, and the king realizes these are his children with his disgraced queen, and takes them to the palace. The king celebrates his reunion with his children. One night, the sister asks his elder brother for a story; the elder brother retells the story of their family, which their aunt Gomati told them: how Gomati and Kasmati met the python, his death, her transformation into the river and Kasmati's misadventures. The king overhears his son's story, realizes the mistake he made, so he orders the execution of the co-queens by impaling and reinstates Kasmati as his true queen. Such is the origin of the Gomati river.

=== Marriage with the Snake (Tripura from Bangladesh) ===
French anthropologist Lucien Bernot translated to French a similar tale he obtained from a Tipera (Tripura) informant from Bangladesh. In this tale, titled Le mariage avec le serpent ("The Marriage with the Snake"), there is a place near the Gumti river with a waterfall named dom bur. One day, two sisters work in their fields on a cold, rainy day, and the elder sister declares that she wants to marry anyone who can provide her and her sister some shelter from the rain. A snake (which Bernot explains it is named mui re boy, referring to a voracious serpent) appears and builds a shelter for both girls. Days pass, and the girls' parents miss their daughters and go to the fields, finding they look very emaciated, since they are sharing most of their food with the snake. The parents ask the younger sister about their situation, and she reveals everything. Meanwhile, the elder sister cries out for Chubala raja for help. As for her family, the younger sister takes her father to the shelter and summons the snake, by calling him her elder sister's husband and saying there is food and drink for him. The snake appears and her father cuts the animal in two. The snake's human wife realizes something is wrong when her ornaments fall from the body to the ground, and rushes to her shelter. Once there, she tries to call out for her snake husband, to no avail. Aided by a dog, the elder sister finds the snake's remains, and begins to cry nonstop. Her younger sister finds the elder and asks what is to become of her. The elder sister tells the girl to reach a little rivulet, climb up a tree and begin spinning on a spinning wheel, for the rivulet will become the Gumti river. It happens thus, and the younger sister settles up a tree. Some time later, a passing raja finds the girl on the tree and decides to make her his next wife. He takes him to the palace and marries her, then she becomes pregnant, to the older concubines' and the elder queen's jealousy. When the girl is in labour, the concubines replace the children, five sons and two daughters, are cast into the Gumti river and replaces for pots. The raja returns home and, falling for the deception, banishes his wife to herd ducks and to dress only in shabby rags. As for the children, their aunt, who lives in the Gumti river, rescues them from the water and raises them. When they are five years old, they come to the river margin to sing and draw in the sand, and, whenever people try to catch them, they rush to the river. The raja leads an expedition to capture the children and the soldiers grab them. The children say that they were raised by their ayōṅ sok (their mother's elder sister), and do not know their mother, but they can recognize her if the woman presses her breast and seven jets of milk squirt from it. The king them brings the concubines to test their parentage, but none produces the jets of milk. The monarch then remembers about his disgraced wife, and sends for her. When the girl comes to see the children, seven jets of her breastmilk squirt. The raja then takes her back as his wife.

=== Other tales ===
==== Rulpuipa (Hrangkhawl) ====
In a tale from the Hrangkhawl people titled Rulpuipa, an old priest lives with his two daughters in a humble hut where rain leaks. The girls go to work in the jhum fields and leave their old father home. One day, they notice that their old tong is too frail and utter aloud that they will marry one that can build them another one, be it human or animal. A python that lives near the tong overhears their conversation and builds the tong overnight for the girls. The following morning, they find the new tong built for them and see the python slithering off, noticing the reptile was the one that did it, so the elder sister marries the python. As time passes and the girls return to work in the jhum plantation, the younger sister summons her snake brother-in-law and offers him food, which is part of the elder sister's share from their family. Their father notices his eldest is becoming weaker and weaker despite the food he gives her, and asks her about it. Eventually he learns of the affair from his cadette, and follows his daughters to the jhum fields; he spies on how the cadette summons the python and lies in waiting. After the girls leave, the man draws the snake by repeating the song and kills his animal son-in-law with a dao, then throws his remains in a nearby river. The elder sister feels there is something wrong with her husband the next time he is called to eat the food, but does not appear. The cadette knows the reason for it, and the elder asks her help her search for the python. The elder sister finds a stream with Sawlpui par flowers (called khumpui in Kokborok), and places one in her hair, but the flower withers quickly. The elder girl plucks a new flower which does not wither, and suspects her husband is there in the river, so she sings a song for her beloved to wait for her, as the water begins to rise and she decides to remain there. Before the waters rise and take her, she advises her sister to walk westward, climb up a banyan tree and work on a spinning wheel while singing a lament, so as to draw the attention of the king's army that will pass by the jhum. After uttering these words, the elder sister is washed away by the river until she reaches an underwater palace where her husband waited for her. As for the younger sister, she does as her sister instructed and sings a song from up the tree, which attracts the attention of the passing armies. The soldiers listen to the melody and report to their king, who goes in person to meet the girl atop the tree. He falls in love with her and decides to make him his new wife. The monarch was already married to six co-wives and had no son yet. One day, the new queen tells the king she is pregnant, to the jealousy of the other co-queens, who conspire to humiliate their rival: the new queen gives birth to six boys and a girl, whom the co-queens throw in the water, and tell the king she gave birth to sticks and stones. The king falls for the deception and demotes the new queen to a servicial role. As for the children, they are rescued and raised by their aunt in the river. Some time later, the king walks by the stream and sees seven children playing and calling for him, saying he is their father. The king approaches them and the siblings tell him the story of how their mother was tricked by the wicked co-queens and made to suffer. The king learns of the truth and restores the septet's mother to her rightful place.

==== Kumbaleni (Chakma) ====
In a Chakma tale translated to Bengali with the title "কুম্বলেনী" ("Kumbaleni"), a couple have two beautiful daughter whom they teach weaving and basket-making. In time, the couple grow old and worry about the girls finding husbands and who will take care of them in their old age. The girls also help in the jhum fields by burning the soil and planting the rice. During a particularly hot period, the sisters work in the fields and feel the heat, but suffer for not having any shelter ("monghor" or "মোনঘর"). The elder girl makes a vow to marry anyone who builds a monghor for them. The following day, the girls find out that someone built them a monghor, which helps them during their work in the fields. Each day, the girls prepare rice and go to the monghor, then the elder sisters asks her cadette, Kumbaleni, to call for her brother-in-law by uttering the name "Bonoi" ("বোনোই"). By doing this, a snake (or serpent god) slithers and goes to meet its human lover, to Kumbaleni's horror. Kumbaleni's sister does not fear the snake. After the snake slithers off, the elder sister makes Kumbaleni promise not to tell her parents about her affair. As times passes, Kumbaleni's secrecy eats away at her, for her sister spends her time with the snake and she herself works alone in the fields, which makes their parents suspicious. Kumbaleni's father goes to the fields to clear up the bushes their daughters should have removed, he sits to eat food and Kumbaleni reveals her sister's secret liaison. He asks his daughter to draw out the snake brother-in-law, while he sharpens a sword. Kumbaleni calls the snake husband ("ভগ্মীপতি", "Bhagmipati") to their house; the snake slithers through an opening and Kumbaleni's father cuts off its head. The snake's head rolls off to a ravine, and its blood creates the "Matya Anush" flowers ("মাত্যা আনুচ"). The next day, Kumbaleni and her sister go to the jhum fields to meet the snake husband. After he fails to respond to their calls, Kumbaleni reveals she told their father the truth and guides her to where they left the body. The elder sister finds the snake's head and a strong fragrant smells from the flowers his blood originated. She takes the head on her lap and begins to cry nonstop, as the water slowly covers her. Kumbaleni witnesses her sister's lament and, as the sun sets, she goes back home, but, as the night is falling, she takes shelter atop a tree.

A king passes by with his retinue and find Kumbaleni atop the tree. He falls in love with her, and she jumps through the branches, while singing verses saying that she is not a woman if she cannot give birth to seven children at once. The king listens to her verses and becomes very interested in the prospect of becoming a father, since he has had no luck with his previous six co-wives. He takes Kumbaleni to his kingdom and marries her in a grand ceremony, and he dotes on her, to the jealousy of the other co-queens. Thus, they plot to destroy their rival: after months, Kumbaleni becomes pregnant. The king gives her a mang (a type of bell) for her to ring in case she needs him for anything. The co-queens ring the bell many times so the king finds nothing wrong and becomes annoyed, leaving her unattended. Kumbaleni gives birth to six sons and a daughter, whom the co-queens throw in the river and places wooden dolls near their rival. The co-queens lie to the king Kumbaleni gave birth to wooden images instead of children, which makes her a witch, and he banishes her from the palace to work and live with the goats. As for the children, after they are thrown in the river, their aunt, who has become the river Gangima ("গঙ্গীমা"), rescues and raises them underwater. Years later, the childless king goes hunting to clear his head, and even goes fishing near the Parvati river. One day, he sights from his window six boys and a girl playing by the river. He decides to approach them, but the siblings escape into the water. Under water, they tell the incident to their river aunt, who advises them to ask for their mother's presence the next time. Months later, the king walks by the river and sits alone with flowers in hand as an offering. The siblings refuse him yet again, but his time the king takes a look at the boys and thinks they look like himself. He asks the siblings if they will give him flowers, but the siblings answer that they will only do so when their mother is present, then dive in the water. A third time, the king returns to the river and pleads to talk to the siblings, but they insist on meeting their mother. The king then brings the six co-queens, but the siblings do not recognize any of them. Lastly, they bring in Kumbaleni. The siblings grab her and take her to water to give her a good bath, dress her in good clothes and give her flowers. The king realizes Kumbaleni is their mother and a victim of a wicked plan, so he asks their forgiveness. The siblings ask the king to banish the queens with enough riches for them, which their father agrees to do. After exiling the co-queens, he reinstates Kumbaleni as his only queen and their children as princes and princess.

== See also ==
- The Boy with the Moon on his Forehead
- The Story of Lalpila (Indian folktale)
- Saat Bhai Champa
- Kiranmala
- Eglė the Queen of Serpents
- Tezin Nan Dlo
