= Tripura Swrwngnai Buthu =

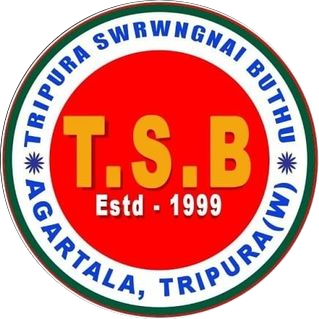
- Abbreviation: TSB
- Formation: 24 October 1999
- Type: Student organisation
- Legal status: Non-political, Non-religious, Socio-cultural body
- Headquarters: Tripura, India
- Region served: Tripura
- Fields: Culture, Education, Youth Development, Community Welfare
- Members: Tripura Students
- Parent organization: Tripura Chubalai Buthu (TCB)
- Website: www.tripuraswrwngnaibuthu.org

Tripura Swrwngnai Buthu (TSB) is a non-political, non-religious socio-cultural student organization of the Tripura community in the Indian state of Tripura. Founded on 24 October 1999, TSB promotes indigenous cultural preservation, educational upliftment, youth leadership, and community welfare . The organization functions through college units, subdivision committees, and a Central Committee and serves as the "student wing of Tripura Chubalai Buthu (TCB)."

TSB is known for organizing cultural programmes, educational campaigns, welfare activities, and its annual State-Level Freshers’–cum–Social Meet, which draws participation from indigenous students across Tripura.

== History ==
Tripura Swrwngnai Buthu was established on 24 October 1999 under the guidance of Tripura Chubalai Buthu (TCB). The organization was formed to unify Tripura students, promote Tripura culture, and encourage youth leadership and social responsibility.

Over the years, TSB has expanded its presence across Tripura through a structured organizational network. It has conducted numerous state-level student gatherings, leadership programs, health camps, cultural events, and welfare drives.
