= Matiranga =

Matiranga is an administrative subdivision in Bangladesh. It may refer to:

- Matiranga Upazila, a upazila in Khagrachhari district
  - Matiranga Union, a union in Bangladesh
  - Matiranga, Khagrachhari, a town in Bangladesh
