= Uchoi =

Tripuri clan live in India and Bangladesh

Uchai is a Tripuri clan of predominantly Christian religion. They are mostly scattered in Mizoram, Tripura (South and Gomati District) and Chittagong Hill Tracts area of Bangladesh. The “Uchai” are considered as “Bru” in Mizoram. However, in Tripura Uchai are considered as separate clan.

== Uchai ==
- Tripuri people
- Kokborok
- Tripuri Dances
- List of Scheduled Tribes in India
