= Murasing =

Murasing is one of the Tripuri clan of Tripura, a state in India. The Murasing mainly dwell in the South Tripura district of Tripura. They speak Kokborok, a language of Tibeto-Burmese origin.

== Customary laws of the Murasing community ==
Every village forms a social structure with key leaders. The chodri is the headman of the village and functions as a justice. The karbari plans social activities and serves as a lawyer. The kahandal is the village treasurer. The bandari is a storekeeper, and the siromoni leads the village singers. In the Murasing community, the clan is called khil. The khils are Murasing, Dongrto, Mosbang, and Totoram.

Each khil has an organisation of holy men in various rolls. MOHONTO, TALUA, PUJARI, PHUDDAR and SORIPHUDDAR. The moronto heads the holy organisation. The talua is the moronto's ambassador. The phuddar is a storekeeper, and the soriphuddar collects dues. Worshipers are called pudari.

=== Birth ===
Customary laws concerning issues like birth, marriage, and death ceremonies differ across clans. In the Murasing clan, a purification ceremony is done seven days after a child's birth. Before purification, no one is allowed in the house except the parents. Anyone who happens to go in the house should take a bath, and then is free to go elsewhere. Similarly, anybody who physically touches the parents must take a bath.

A child is named at birth. On the day of purification, a holy rite is performed to a water God, and then a Tulsi-God is worshiped. Then holy water is sprayed with a tulsi leaf to make the house holy again. Several plates are placed with potential names for the child. Each plate bears a name, written with a lighted wick soaked in mustard oil. The name that burns the longest becomes the name of the newborn child.

An ear hole is made when the child is four or five years old. Female children receive a hole in the nose as well. Girls of 18 to 80+ years begin to wear a risa bound around their breasts.

=== Youth organization ===
In the Murasing clan, an adolescent boy is called a boslock, and an adolescent female is called a chaslok. Young men are chaklui and young girls are sikla. Every year, after harvest, a convention of the youth organisation is held. In the presence of the heads of the society, each young man and woman is garlanded and given a new name. This ritualistic festival is called Sikla Mung chamani. This confirms the status of the youth in the society. Names are chosen with special suggestion to the prominent traits of individual personalities. A sober and responsible youth might be named Sikla Rai, A girl with an especially melodious voice may be named Toksa Rangi. The new name completely replaces the old name. It is like the Freshers’ welcome of the institution. thus a youth organisation is raised and maintained in each village.

The customs and conventions of the organisation are considered inviolable. An administrative hierarchy rules as well. The chief of the organisation is sikla missip, a name given to a young man who is a wise natural leader. Next to him comes the sikla rai. The sikla missip can be considered equivalent to a president, and the sikla rai to a secretary. Next comes the sikla chadiri, the arbitrator. The dagia directs planning. He also administers punishment. The cha'mprasi executes the punishment. The Twifang is an organizer, public relations, and liaison officer. Appointing a young girl Nareng is the counterpart of sikla missip, and lupjari of sikla rai.

Some convention of the youth organization are:

All sikla mung chajak (newly ‘baptized’ young men) must be called by their new name. Using their old name is a punishable offence. In any village with a youth organization, no one must interfere with a young man's visit to a girl. An outsider young man cannot visit a young girl of a village with a youth organization, without proper permission stands cancelled. Use of unbecoming expression by young people is strictly forbidden. Arbitration of all youth affairs rests with the organization. The organization may impose severe punishment. Matters that cannot be settled through the youth organization are handed over to the village elder-council. If most of the young people in a village get married, the old organization dissolves and a new one begins. Many of these conventions are gradually being lost, but they indicate a highly developed social control system backed by voluntary will. This is one of the unique features of Murasing society.

=== Marriage ===
The Murasing clan marriage ceremony is performed in many ways. There is arranged marriage, love marriage, elope marriage, sakbaksa (when others force an unwilling person to marry or help a helpless person to marry), chamari tisai kaimani (a groom is brought to the bride's house for marriage), Hamjuk twlangwi kaimani (a bride is brought to the groom's house for marriage), and Ma-pha soijakfano khogwi kaijakmani (with parental permission, a couple elopes).

Except with elopement, the groom's parents and relatives go to the house of bride with moori, batasa, kuai-fatui, etc., and propose the marriage to the bride's parents. If the bride's parents accept the gifts, it means they agree. The groom's parents and relatives go to the bride's house with the social leader willing to finalize the matter. The groom's mother pays Rs.5 to the bride's mother for nursing during childhood. Then the bride's father demands a khorokseng. The groom's parents must fulfill his demand. The khorokseng demand is not limited.

In Murasing clan all villagers and other relatives are invited in any marriage ceremony. In the day of marriage at first two ayas take water from a river, accompanied by a band. After then AYA's do bathing groom and bride with that water. After bathing and prepare for marry, they go to the Tulsi-God. Beside the Tulsi-God the OCHAI performed marry them with Tulsi-Mala. Then they go to BEDI for blessed from parents, elders, relatives and so on. The next day of marriage ceremony people take some food as blessing to new couple. After 7 day of marriage the new couple go to the bride's house as HORSINI.

In a family if young member married before the elder member, then he \ she would pay the penalty of respect to each of the elder member. It is called as BARSENG. A SAKBAKSA MANTI fine is levied for this cessation of SIKLA MUNG CHAMANI or youth organization's membership, although the fine is only a token one.

=== Divorce ===
In the Murasing clan, someone may divorce in the presence of the heads of the society. The spouse who demands the divorce must pay a penalty—called a kakseng—to the other. After divorce, they may divide their children and property equally or by agreement. After divorce anyone can remarry.

=== Funeral system ===
In the Murasing clan, funeral rites are performed in two ways. Non-vegetarian are cremated and vegetarians are buried. The body is cleaned with water and dressed in new clothes. Relatives take a last look at the body. After that the body is carried with waying and holy song, and buried or cremated.

Male non-vegetarians are cremated on seven stages of wood. Female non-vegetarian is cremated on five stages of wood. The deceased's youngest child or another relative gives them water. Then the deceased's eldest child, or a relative sets the fire.

In burials, the deceased is placed directly in the earth. At the bottom of a six or seven foot hole, a vertical tomb extends to the west. The body is seated inside this tomb with some belongings. The tomb is filled with salt and fenced with bamboo that keeps soil from penetrating. Then the main hole is filled in with mud. A tulsi-tree is planted on the surface of the tomb, above the body's head. Then a small bamboo hut is built on the surface of the tomb. For the next three, five, or seven days, family members, relatives, and others perform a death ritual. The bereaved repeat this death ritual at the end of the year—or, if someone wishes, at the end of every year.

== See also ==
- Tripuri people
- Kokborok
- Tripuri dances
- List of Scheduled Tribes in India
