= Mamita Festival =

Mamita Festival is a festival is observed in Tripura by the Jamatia, Tripura, and Noatia people.
