= Matiranga Union =

Union of Khagrachhari District, Chittagong, Bangladesh

Matiranga মাটিরাঙ্গা
- Union
- Interactive map of Matiranga
- Country: Bangladesh
- Division: Chittagong Division
- District: Khagrachhari District
- Upazila: Matiranga Upazila

Area
  - Total: 137.27 km^{2} (53.00 sq mi)

Population (2022)
  - Total: 13,910
  - Density: 101.3/km^{2} (262.5/sq mi)
- Time zone: UTC+6 (BST)
- Postal code: 4450
- Website: matirangaup.khagrachhari.gov.bd

Matiranga Union is a union of Matiranga Upazila under Khagrachhari District.

== Demography ==
According to 2022 census, total population of the Union are 13,910. Among them, 1,166 are Muslim, 11,547 are Hindu, 1,020 are Buddhist, 174 are Christian and 3 follow others religion.

Religion-2022
1. Hinduism (83.0%)
2. Islam (8.38%)
3. Buddhism (7.33%)
4. Christianity (1.25%)
5. Others (0.02%)

== Ethnicity ==
This Union is home to a variety of different ethnic groups. Among them, 1,555 are Bengali, 11,335 are Tripura, 644 are Marma, 373 are Chakma and 3 are of others ethnic groups.

Ethnicity-2022
1. Tripura (81.5%)
2. Bengali (11.2%)
3. Marma (4.63%)
4. Chakma (2.68%)
5. Others (0.02%)
