= Gopi Nath Tripura =

Indian politician

Member of the Tripura Legislative Assembly
- In office 09 March 1972 – 1977
- Constituency: Pabiachhara

Personal details
- Born: Tripura, India
- Party: Indian National Congress

Gopi Nath Tripura was a Tipra Indian politician from Tripura. He was elected as a Member of Legislative Assembly (MLA) representing Pabiachhara in 1972.
