= Kharchi puja =

Hindu festival from Tripura, India

Kharchi Puja
- Type: Hindu Festival
- Frequency: Annual

Kharchi Puja is a Hindu festival from Tripura, India. Performed in Agartala in July or August, the festival involves the worship of the fourteen gods forming the dynasty deity of the Tripuri people. Kharchi Puja is one of the most popular festivals in Tripura. It's a week-long royal Puja which falls in the month of July on the eighth day of the new moon and attracts thousands of people. This festival is celebrated at Agartala (Puran Agartala) in the temple premises of Fourteen gods. There are many legends associated with this Puja. The celebrations extend until a week and are held in the temple premises which are attended by thousands of people.

== Name ==
The word "Kharchi" is derived from the word "Khya" which means "Earth". Kharchi Puja is basically done to worship the earth. All of rituals are of tribal origin, which includes worshipping fourteen gods and Mother Earth. The Puja is performed to wash out the sins and to clean the post-menstrual phase of Mother Earth's menstruation. Thus the Puja is performed for seven consecutive days. On the day of the Puja, the fourteen gods are carried to river "Saidra" by the members of "Chantai". The gods are bathed in the holy water and are brought back to the temple. They are again placed in the temple by performing Puja, offering of Flowers and Vermillion. Animal sacrifice is also an important part of this festival and includes sacrificing of Goats and Pigeons. People offer sweets and the sacrificial meat to god. Both tribal and non-tribal people join and celebrate the festival in a festive mood by becoming a part of it. Plenty of other attractions along with a large fair and cultural programs are organized during this time.

== Timing and mythological background ==
Kharchi puja is performed after 15 days of "Ama Pechi". According to Tripuri legends, "Ama Pechi" is the Menstruation of the mother goddess, or Earth mother, and the soil is neither ploughed nor dug anywhere during this time. Among Tripuri people menstruation is considered unholy and all significant functions by women are prohibited. The Earth is therefore considered unclean after the menstruation of the earth mother during "Ama Pechi". The Kharchi puja is performed to wash out the Post-Menstrual uncleanliness of the Earth mother's Menstruation.

== Activities ==
Kharchi puja lasts for seven consecutive days. The festival is held at the temple of fourteen gods at Old Agartala. On the day of puja, the fourteen deities are carried by chanting members and taken to the river Saidra, bathed in the holy water, and then returned to the temple. The deities are then decorated with various flowers and vermillion is placed on each deity's forehead.

Every day large numbers of people attend the festival and both Tripuri and Non-Tripuri participants. People offer different types of Prasāda i.e., Offerings like Goat, Buffalo, Sweets, etc.. Various cultural programmes are performed each evening and a large fair is organised to mark the occasion. People look to their own welfare as well as the welfare of the society and the state in general.
