= Noatia =

Clan of Tripura state of northeast India

Noatia are one of the Tripuri clans of Tripura state of India. The clan mainly lives in the North Tripura districts of the Tripura state of India. They speak the Noatia dialect of Kokborok which is of Tibeto-Burmese origin.

The Noatia are one of the important Tripuri clan in Tripura. In fact, Noatias have resided in the Arakan Hill Tracts for a long time before. As per 2011 Census, their population is 14,298.

== Distribution ==
Noatia also reside throughout Tripura such as in South Tripura, Sepahijala Tripura, North Tripura, Gomati Tripura and West Tripura district. At Garjee, Takma Chara, Kalaban & Rothaicherra under Udaipur sub-division of South Tripura there are many Noatia families, as well as in Sepahijala district at like Chandul, Twiwandal, Khamarbari and Twisa Khandal, Noabari and even at Urmai Kalakhet and also many Noatian families in sonamura subdivision like Manai pathar, Nidaya, Jamtali (Kalikhala), Jagatrampur, and also many other parts of Tripura where Noatia culture exists which are yet to be known

== History ==
It is said that Noatia is not their actual clan name, and are actually Tripuris. Legend says that once a furious war took place between the then Tripura king and Arakan king. In that battle, Arakan king took lead and captured hundreds of Tripuri soldiers. These Tripuri soldiers had to stay at Arakan. During their stay at Arakan, they had contact and interaction with the local tribals and as a result their language and culture developed changes to some extent. Even today in the life and culture of Noatias influence of their old culture are still found in the form of their physical structure, skin colour, food habit, language, rites and rituals.

== Clans ==
Noatia have 16(Sixteen) major sub-clans. These sub-clans are Landa, Ramsaa, Debbarman, Lagung, Murasing, Noatia, Tripuri. Noatias are Hindus and observe all pujas and festivals as per their tradition and customs. Vaishnavism has great influence over the Noatias. They also observe Garia and Baisu festivals like other Tripuri clans.

== See also ==
- Kokborok
- Tripuri Dances
- List of Scheduled Tribes in India
- Tripuri Kshatriya
