= Garia puja =

Festival of Tripura, India

Baba Garia puja is a festival of Tripura, India. It is held for the seven days and night in the month of Boishakh Bisi-kwtal. It is also known by various names such as Buisu, Bihu, Busy, Boisabi, Sangrain. In 2019, Garia puja was on 21 April.

In Garia puja devotees sacrifice chicken for ritual purpose in Tripuri community. All kokborok speaking tribes and Halam tribes worship their supreme God Baba Garia for prosperity and well-being. Jamatia Tribe have a unique mass celebration of Garia puja at State level. It is a seven-day festival to honour the deity Baba Garia is held annually on the first day of Tripuri calendar/Bengali calendar month of Boishakh.
