= Koloi =

Koloi/Kalai
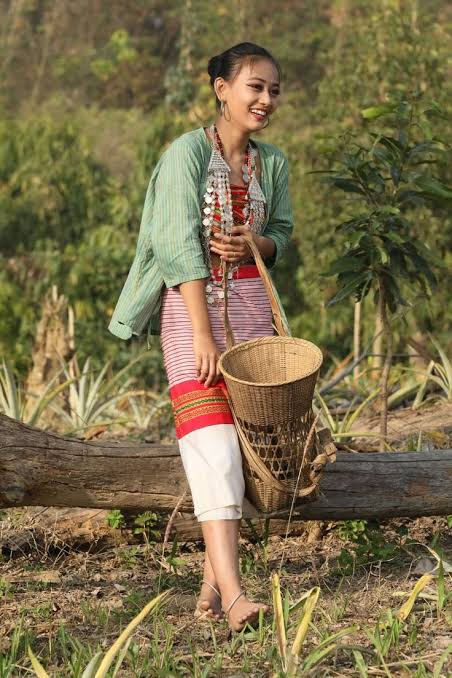

Profile
- Country: India
- Region: Tripura
- Ethnicity: Tripuri

Chief
- none

Koloi (also known as Kalai or Koloy) is one of Tripuri clan in Tripura state of India. They mainly dwell in the West Tripura districts. They speak the language Kokborok (Tripuri) which is of Tibeto-Burmese origin.

== Notable people ==
- Kamal Koloi, current Executive Member of TTAADC and former Editor-in-Chief of Kok Tripura.
- Debabrata Koloi, Politician was the former CEM of TTAADC for a brief period during IPFT government between 2000 and 2005.
- Elizabeth Koloi, Kokborok singer & actress.

== See also ==
- Tripuri people
- Kokborok
- Tripuri Dances
- List of Scheduled Tribes in India
