= Benichandra Jamatia =

Indian writer (1930–2020)

- Born: 1930; Tripura (princely state), British India
- Died: 14 December 2020 (aged 89–90); Udaipur, Tripura
- Occupations: Writer, Baul Singer
- Spouse: Durgamati Jamatia
- Children: 9
- Writing career
- Language: Kokborok
- Genre: Folk
- Notable works: Dormo Lam bay Kok Borok Baul(English:The path of Dharma and Kok Borok devotional songs)
- Notable awards: Padma Shri(2020)

Benichandra Jamatia (1930 – 14 December 2020) was a Tripuri Indian folk writer and litterateur, known for his contribution to the fields of literature, songs and education in Tripura. He is credited with introducing the baul singing tradition of West Bengal in Kokborok language for the first time. In 2020, he was awarded the Padma Shri (2020), the fourth-highest civilian award in India.

== Biography ==
Benichandra Jamatia was born to Padasingh Jamatia and Suchitra in Maharani, Gomati District, Tripura. While he was young, his mother narrated the Puranas stories to him in the Kokborok tongue. His days were taken up by farming and cattle rearing.

He was married to Durgamati Jamatia and has nine children.

Jamatia died on 14 December 2020

== Awards ==
- Padma Shri 2020

== Death ==
He died at his home on 14 December 2020.

== See also ==
- List of Padma Shri award recipients (2020–2029)
