= Dances of Tripura =

Cultural aspect in the state of Tripura

There are several forms of folk dance performed in the state of Tripura in northeastern India. These dances are performed by the Tripuri (the largest regional ethnic group) and Mog (or Marma) peoples, during annual regional celebrations, such as sowing and harvesting festivals.

== The dancers ==
The Tripuris comprise over half the tribal population of Tripura. They live in the hills of Tripura and are jhum cultivators. Their dances and festivals revolve around the agricultural seasons. Other large local groups, such as the Marmas, Halams, and Reangs share in and conduct their versions of these dance festivals as well.

== Types of dances ==
=== Goria/Garia ===
The Tripuris practice jhum, or shifting cultivation and the Goria Puja festival marks the commencement of their sowing season. Garia is commemorated through the Garia dance that accompanies the prayers and pujas for a bountiful harvest and is held in April. The Goria or Garia dance is performed at the time of the sowing of the crops during the festival, in the month of April, and includes people from other ethnic groups in addition to the Tripuri themselves. The dance is accompanied by drums and flutes, and consists of both sexes dancing from village to village in a gradually increasing tempo through various mudra which mimic the movements of different aspects of nature.

=== Hai-hak ===
Hai-hak dance is a dance which is specific to the Halam community within the Tripuri. It is performed to honor the goddess Lakshmi after the annual harvest, and is typically done at her place of worship.

=== Hojagiri ===
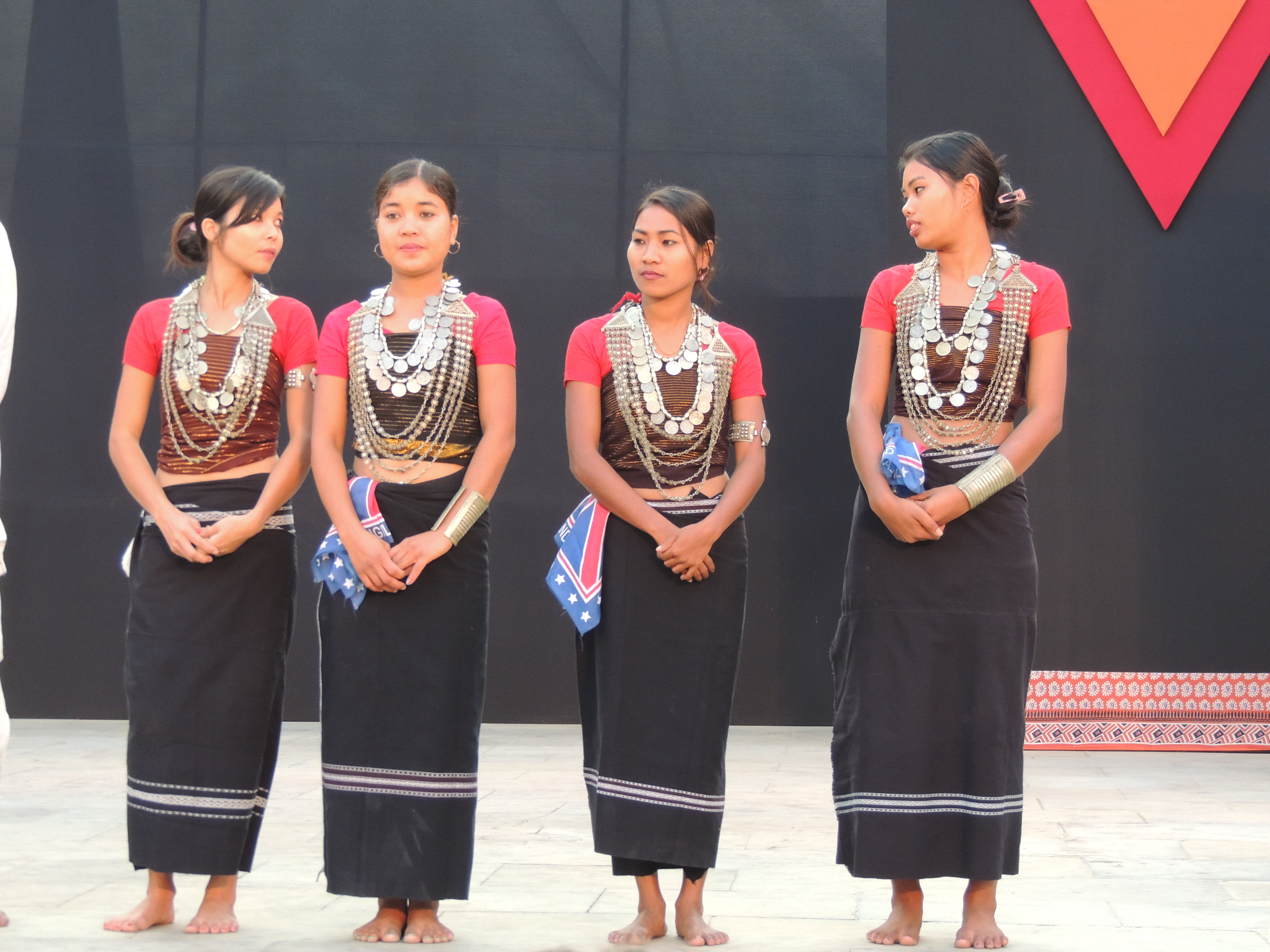
Hojagiri dancers

Hojagiri is a folk dance performed by young women of the Tripuri people of Reang clan. It comprises four to six members in a team singing and balancing various objects or props on their head and hands, (such as a bottle or an earthen pitcher on the head; and lamps on the hands) while only moving the lower half of the body.

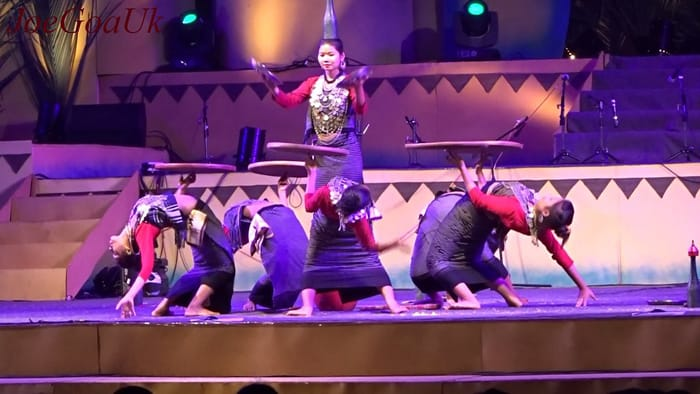
Some mudras (gestures) of Hojagiri dance

=== Jhum ===
The Jhum dance is a dance which is typically performed by girls and boys.

=== Lebang Boomani ===
Both men and women participate at harvest time in the Lebang Boomani dance. The men use bamboo clappers called tokkas to set a beat while the women join them waving colorful scarves to catch the lebang (colorful insects of the region). The rhythmic play of the clappers is thought to attract the lebang out of their hiding places allowing the women to catch them. The dance is accompanied by musical instruments like the flute, khamb, the percussion instrument known as a pung, and the sarinda. Women adorn themselves with silver chains, rings, and bangles; and a;so ear and nose rings made of bronze.

==== Lebangs ====
Following Garia, there is a lull in agricultural activity as the Tripuris await the monsoon. During this time, hordes of colorful insects called lebangs descend on the hill slopes in search of the freshly sown seeds. The dancers depict how bamboo clappers are used to catch them. The Tripuris believe that the number of lebangs caught indicate how good the harvest will be.

=== Mamita ===
Mamita dance is performed at the Mamita Festival, the harvest festival of the Tripuri people.

=== Mosak sulmani ===
The Mosak sulmani dance is a traditional Indian dance. It originated in Tripura as a hunting ritual. It mimics the act of hunting through elaborate gestures.

=== Owa dance ===
The dance is one of the traditional dances of the Marma clans of Tripura, who will also perform the Sangrai dance. The Marmas, also known as Mogs, are Buddhists; and the Owa -Cho -labre is one of their main Buddhist festivals. The Mogs celebrate the Owa festival on the full moon day of Ashwin in the Bengali calendar. They attend the Buddhist temple, and laterwards launch paper boats or toy boats in the river.

=== Sangrai ===
The Sangrai dance is a traditional Indian dance performed by the Marma community on the occasion of the Sangrai festival during the month of April (Chaitra in the Bengali calendar year). The Marmas are one of the 19 tribes in Tripura. This dance originated in Tripura. On 26 January 2018, on India's Republic day, Rajpath witnessed for the first time a traditional dance of the Mog tribe of Tripura, the land of plentiful myths and legends.
