= Tripuri people =

Ethnic group of Tripura, India

Tripuri people Tripuris Tripura
Tripura
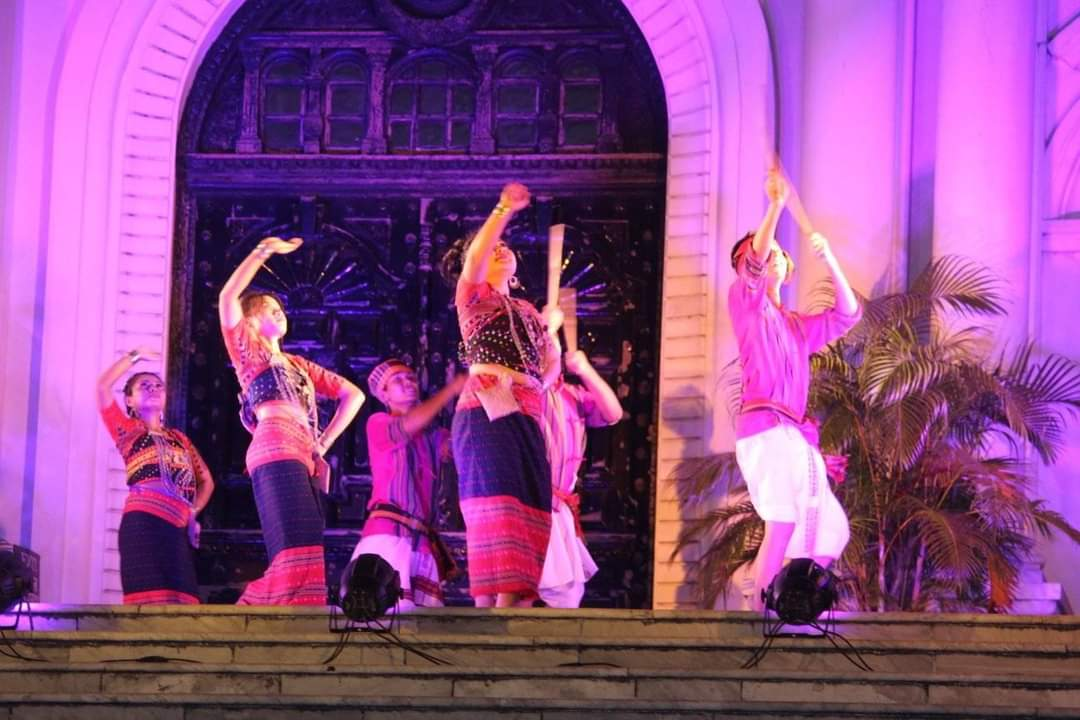
- Tripuri traditional Lebang dance

Total population
- 1,300,000+ (2011)

Regions with significant populations
- India: 1,011,294
- Tripura: 950,875
- Mizoram: 32,634
- Assam: 22,890
- Meghalaya: 2,735
- Nagaland: 350
- Gujarat: 239
- Manipur: 208
- Jammu and Kashmir: 190
- Rajasthan: 169
- West Bengal: 120
- Maharashtra: 118
- Karnataka: 114
- Bangladesh: 156,578 (2021)

Languages
- Kókborok (Tripuri)

Religion
- Majority; Hinduism; Minority; Christianity

Related ethnic groups
- Other Sal-speaking peoples, especially other Bodo–Kachari peoples

The Tripuri people, also known as Tripuri, Tripura, Tiprasa, Twipras or Tipperahs, are a Tibeto-Burman-speaking ethnic group of the Indian state of Tripura and the independent nation of Bangladesh. They are the descendants of the inhabitants of the Twipra/Tripura Kingdom in North-East India and Bangladesh. The Tripuri people through the Manikya dynasty ruled the Kingdom of Tripura for over 600 years starting from 1400 until the kingdom joined the Indian Union on 15 October 1949.

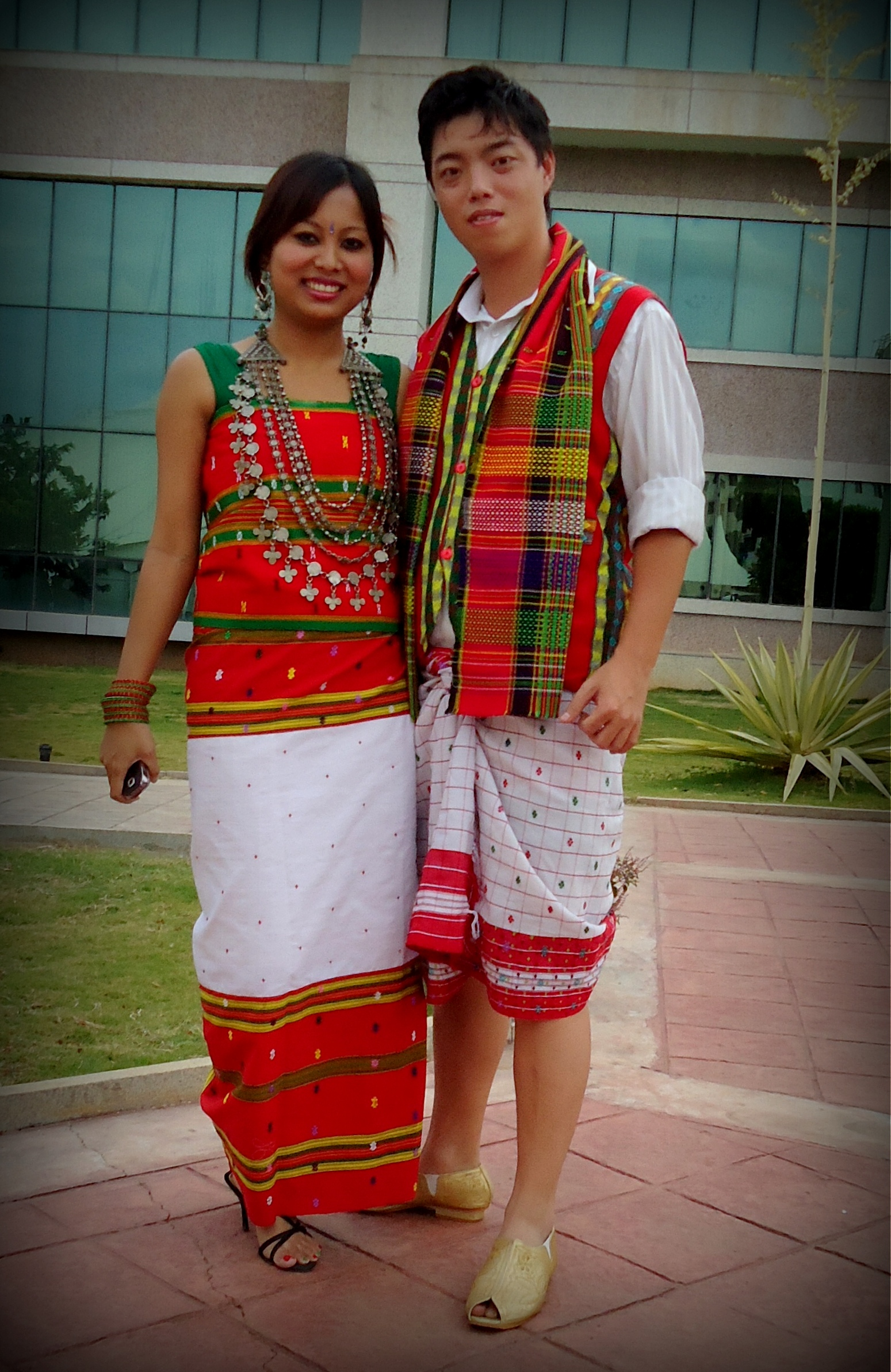
Tripuri couple in their traditional attire.

== Ancestral origins ==
The Tripuri people are part of the Tibeto-Burman ethnic group. Historical accounts suggest that they migrated from the upper courses of the Yangtze and Hwang Ho rivers in Western China. Over time, they moved through the Himalayas, eventually settling in the region now known as Tripura.

== History ==
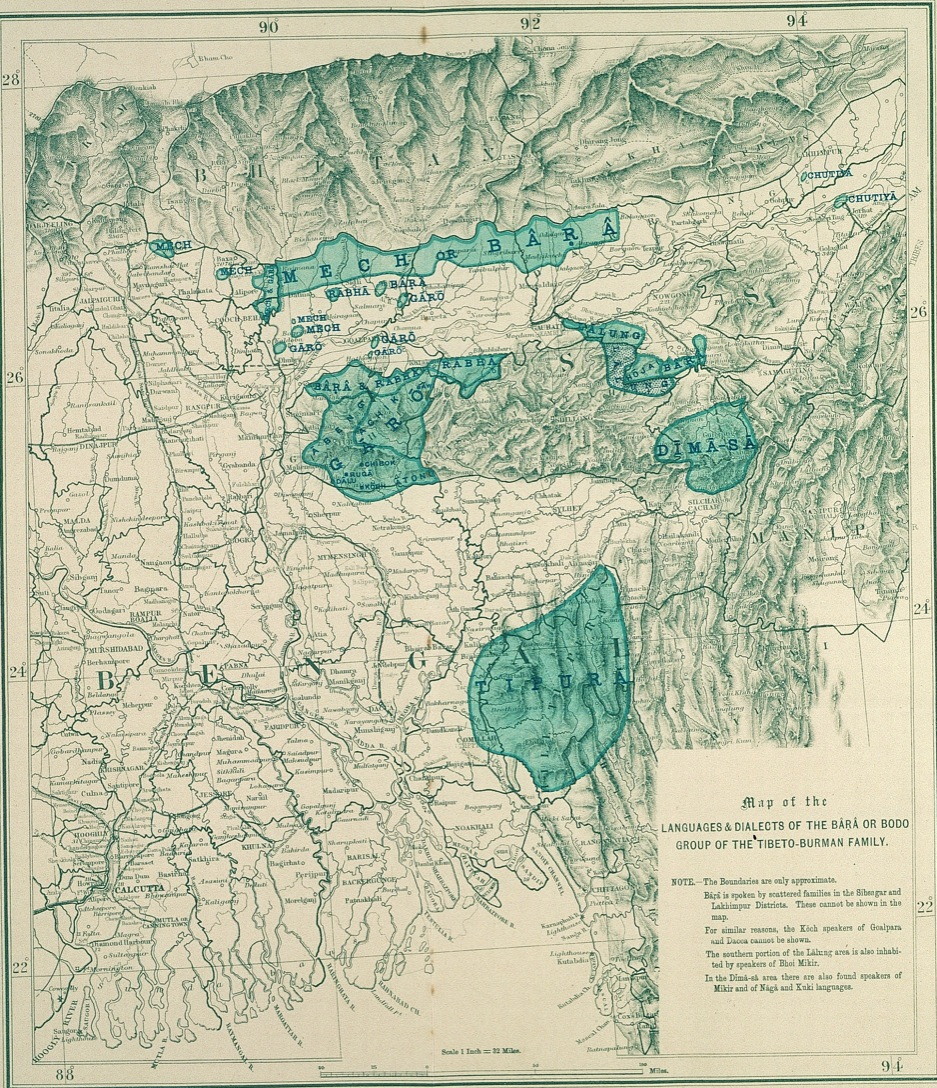
Distribution of Tipra, as reported in the Language Survey of India 1903

Tripuris are the native people of Tripura having its own unique and distinct rich culture, tradition, and history. They were able to expand their influence as far south as Chittagong Division, as far west as Comilla, Noakhali and as far north as Sylhet Division (all in present Bangladesh).

=== Establishment of Twipra Kingdom ===
After migrating to the northeastern region of the Indian subcontinent, the Tripuri people established the Twipra Kingdom, later known as the Tripura Kingdom. This realm emerged as an influential power in the area. Established around the 15th century, it was ruled by the Manikya dynasty, which governed the region for several centuries. The rulers of the Manikya lineage were recognised for their adept governance and their commitment to safeguarding the kingdom's independence amidst external challenges.

At its peak, the Tripura Kingdom's territory spanned areas now part of modern India and Bangladesh. It included the Barak Valley (Cachar Plains), Hailakandi, and Karimganj in today's Assam; Comilla, Sylhet, and the Chittagong Hill Tracts in Bangladesh; along with the current state of Tripura. The kingdom's boundaries were marked by the Khasi Hills to the north, the Manipur Hills to the northeast, the Arakan Hills of Burma to the east, the Bay of Bengal to the south, and the Brahmaputra River to the west.

=== Integration into modern India ===
The princely state of Tripura maintained its sovereignty until the mid-20th century. On 15 October 1949, following India's independence, Tripura was merged into the Indian Union. Subsequently, it was designated as a Union Territory on 1 September 1956, and later attained full statehood on 21 January 1972.

== Tripuri in Bangladesh ==
According to 2022 census, Tripuras are mainly found in Khagrachhari District (13.79%), Bandarban District (4.69%) and Rangamati Hill District (1.90%).

They are the second largest ethnic group in Matiranga Upazila (18.68%) and Ramgarh Upazila (13.28%).

Upazila	District	Percentage of Tripura
Thanchi Upazila	Bandarban District	21.27%
Khagrachhari Sadar Upazila	Khagrachhari District	20.99%
Panchhari Upazila	Khagrachhari District	19.36%
Guimara Upazila	Khagrachhari District	18.79%
Matiranga Upazila	Khagrachhari District	18.68%
Ramgarh Upazila	Khagrachhari District	13.28%
Ruma Upazila	Bandarban District	8.95%
Rajasthali Upazila	Rangamati District	8.16%
Rowangchhari Upazila	Bandarban District	7.73%
Dighinala Upazila	Khagrachhari District	7.38%
Belaichhari Upazila	Rangamati District	6.08%
Manikchhari Upazila	Khagrachhari District	5.60%
Alikadam Upazila	Bandarban District	5.41%
Baghaichhari Upazila	Rangamati District	5.13%
Lama Upazila	Bandarban District	4.12%
Mahalchhari Upazila	Khagrachhari District	3.97%
Bandarban Sadar Upazila	Bandarban District	1.59%
Rangamati Sadar Upazila	Rangamati District	1.50%
Others		<1%

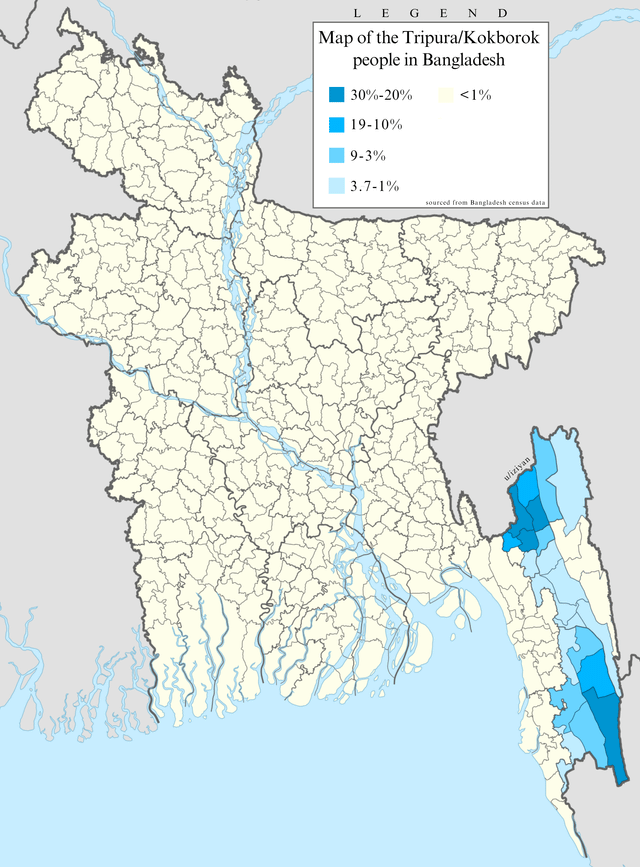
Map of Tripuri people in Bangladesh by upazila

== Language ==
The Tripuri people speak Kokborok (also known as Tipra), a Tibeto-Burman language. Tripuri is the official language of Tripura, India. There are estimated to be more than one million speakers of the dialects of Tripuri in Tripura, and additional speakers in Mizoram and Assam in India, as well as Sylhet and the Chittagong Hill Tracts in Bangladesh. It is also spoken in Feni.

There are three main dialects of Tripuri, though the central dialect of the royal family, DebBarma (Puratan Tripur), is a prestige dialect understood by everyone. It is the standard for teaching and literature. It is taught as the medium of instruction up to class fifth and as subject up to graduate level in Tripura.

Historically, Tripuri was written in native Tripuri script known as Koloma. The earliest known writing in Tripuri dates from the 1st century AD, and was written in Koloma. The script was replaced by an alphabet based on the Eastern Nagari script. Currently the revival of ancient Koloma script is in process.

Some of the most notable Tripuri historical literary works, written by court scholars, include:

- The "Rajratnakar", The royal Chronicle of Tripuri kings
- The Rajmala, Chronicle of Tripuri Kings of Tripura.

== Culture ==
=== Festivals ===
==== Buisu ====
The Buisu is the new year festival of Tripuri/Tripura People in India and Bangladesh. This Festival is the traditional New Year's Day which falls on 13 or 14 April.

The Buisu Festival begins with Hari Buisu which is the first day. In Hari Buisu Tripuri People clean up their houses and decorate their houses with different flowers. They pray a special prayer in the evening in their houses and temples. The next day is known as Buisu which is the main event, where people visit each other's houses. During this main Buisu, people actually socialise with each other. People cook different traditional foods along with others.

==== Goriya ====
It's the seven day long festival, where Tripuri god Lord Goriya is worshipped starting from Buisu to Sena.

==== Sena ====
It's the last day of Goriya worship, where Lord Goriya gives all the household work back to Goddess Mailuma & Khuluma.

==== Kharchi ====
Kharchi mwtai is the worship of the dynasty deity of Tripuri people, the fourteen gods. It is performed in the month of July/August on the eight day of new moon. The fourteen gods are worshipped by the royal priest Chontai.

==== Ker ====
Ker mwtai is celebrated 14 days following the end of Kharchi mwtai. It is the strictest puja ever performed by Tripuri people. It may be mentioned here that no puja or worship is so strictly performed as is the Ker of Tripuri people, by any section of the people in the world. In this also all the gods of Tripuri people are worshipped at a time.

==== Osa ====
The worship of Tripuri Goddess Ama Osa.

==== Mamita ====
Mamita festival is the harvest festival of Tripuri people where the worship of goddess Ama Mailuma takes place. The Mamita festival is held during the time of Osa Mwtai.

==== Hojagiri ====
Tripuri festival of lights where goddess Ama Mailuma & Ama Khuluma are worshipped. It is said that it the festival was stated during the reign of Tripuri King Subrairaja to create awareness among the Tripuri people during that era.

==== Hangrai ====
Hangrai is a harvest festival and one of the main festivals of Tripuri people. This festival is very meaningful to Tripuri People. The Tripuris celebrate Hangrai with a festive way. People start taking preparation of Hangrai which begins 4–5 days before. The younger generation make Nowshah, small huts made of bamboo and paddy husks. They gather for picnic where hot rice cakes and different foods are served. Elders would remain at home and take shower early in the morning and wear fresh clothes. They gather around and share their Awangs, Moi or Curries and rice-based alcohol Arak or chuwak. They enjoy the entire day until midnight.

In this festival Tripuri People visit holy places, worship God and perform individual sacrifices and rituals.

=== Religion ===
Religion among the Tripuri
1. Hinduism (93.6%)
2. Christianity (6.40%)

In the 2011 census, 93.6% of the Tripuri people followed an admixture of folk religions and Hinduism and 6.4% were Christians (mostly, Baptists). Tripuri Hinduism is a syncretic religion, melding traditional folk religion with Hindu elements, commonly found in northeastern India. A minority of the Uchoi clan of the Tripuri are Buddhist.

=== Gastronomy ===
Tripuri people loves to eat different types of fresh vegetables from hill. In their food menu, Bamboo Shoots are one of the traditional dish which they call "Muya" in their Kokborok Language.

The use of dry fish is common in their daily cuisine. Sticky rice which is one of the traditional food of Tripuri People and they eat sticky rice in different ways including Awang Bangwi/ Awang Bwthai, Awang Sokrang, Awang Phanswi, Phap ni Awang and Awang Belep.

Eight Traditional Recipes or Cuisines which Tripuri People eat in their daily life.

1. Chakhwi
2. Gudok
3. Bermabwtwi
4. Mosdeng
5. Awandru
6. Mwkhwikwtwi
7. Serma
8. Thokmui

==== Awang Bangwi ====
Awang Bangwi or Awang Bwthai which is one of the traditional food of Tripuri People. This cone shaped rice rolls in Lairu or banana leaves for steam which is loved by Tripuris. Awan Bangwi which is a rice cake prepared by Tripuris including sticky rice, butter or Ghee, raisins, nuts, ginger and onion. Awan Bangwi is the national food of Tripura State.

==== Bamboo chicken/pork/fish ====
Using bamboo for cooking chicken or pork or fish is popular and traditional way of cooking process of Tripuri People. The process is simple. Marinating chicken or pork or fish with different ingredients and stuff the chicken/pork/fish inside the bamboo with little water. Then cook it for 40–50 min on Charcoal.

This Bamboo Chicken/Pork/Fish is widely popular among Tripuri People.

=== Tripuri games and sports ===
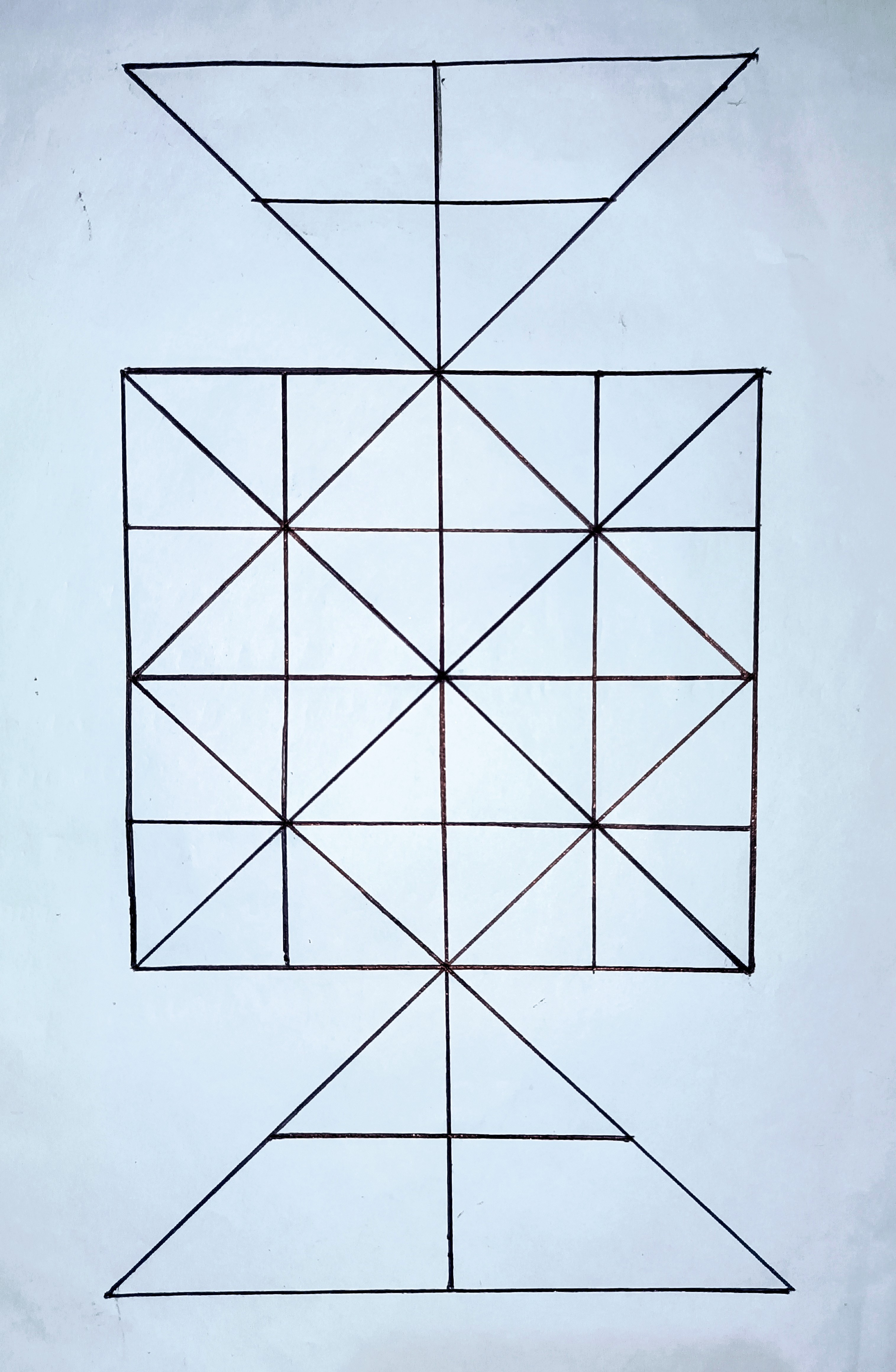
"Pait" one of the ancient Tripuri brain game

Like many parts of the world the Tripuri has traditional sports. It is common in almost all the clans of Tripuri. They are called thwngmung in Tripuri.

=== Marriage ===
The traditional Tripuri marriage system, known as Hamjwk Tubui Kaimani, begins with the bride's and groom's families negotiating through a marriage broker called a Raibai. Once the bride is chosen, the groom's family agrees to dowry demands, including money, ornaments, and household items. The formal engagement, called Koksungma, includes rituals like blessings with rice beer and offerings, followed by a feast where elders bless the bride.

On the wedding day, rituals include worshipping the Lampra Wathop deity and Tuisangramma, followed by the groom's procession to the bride's home with music and traditional water pots. After completing the formalities, the bride leaves her family in a ceremonial palanquin journey to her new home. Unique traditions include the bride washing elders' hands during the feast and a taboo preventing the bride's mother from attending the wedding. These customs showcase the Tripuri community's rich cultural heritage.

== Kinship ==
The main Tripuri clans are:

- Debbarma
- Reang
- Jamatia
- Tripura
- Noatia
- Koloi
- Murasing
- Rupini
- Uchoi/Usoi

== Society ==
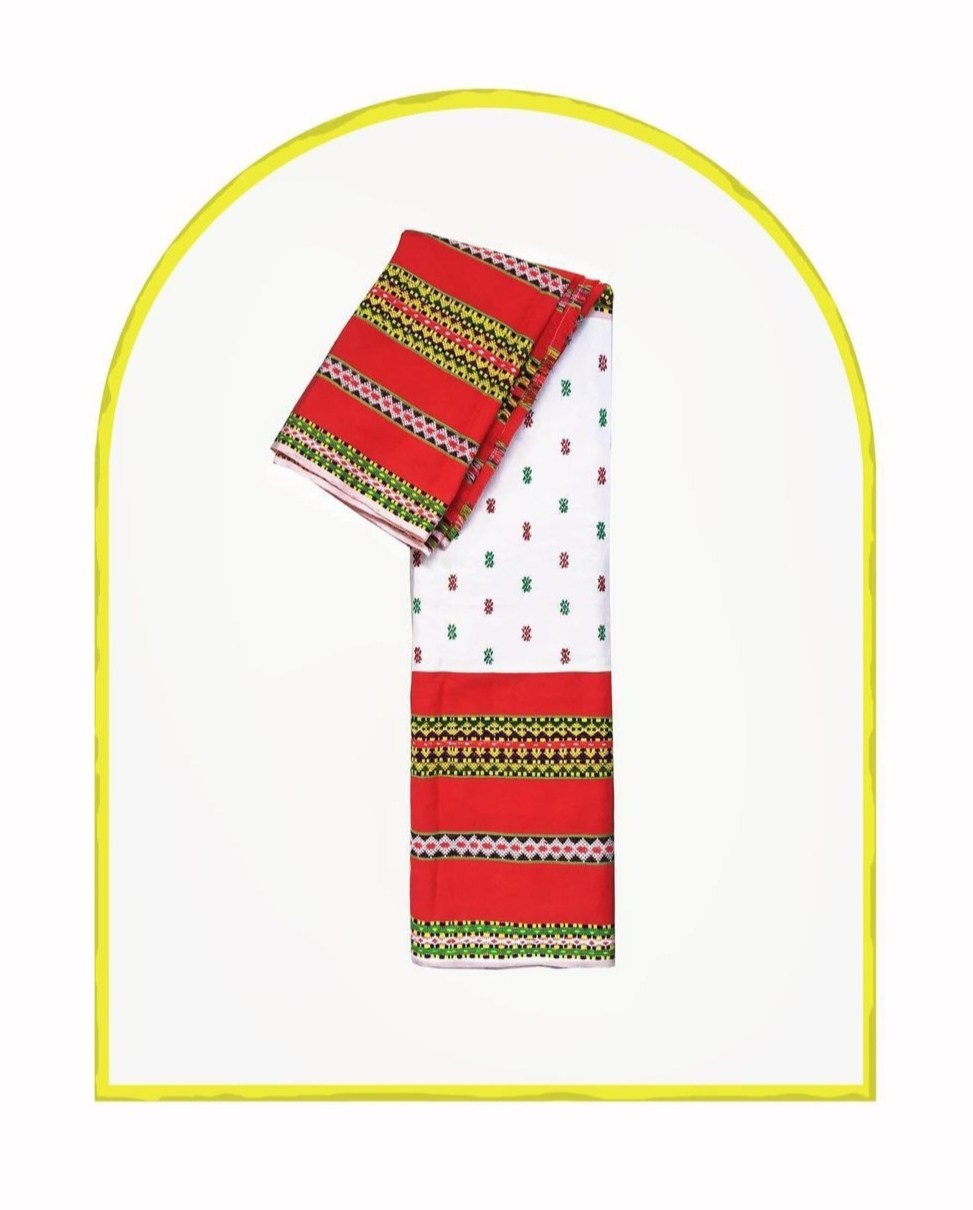
A rignai pattern.

The Tripuri people consist of clans, each with its own elementary social and administrative organisation starting from the village level and up to the chieftainship of the whole community.

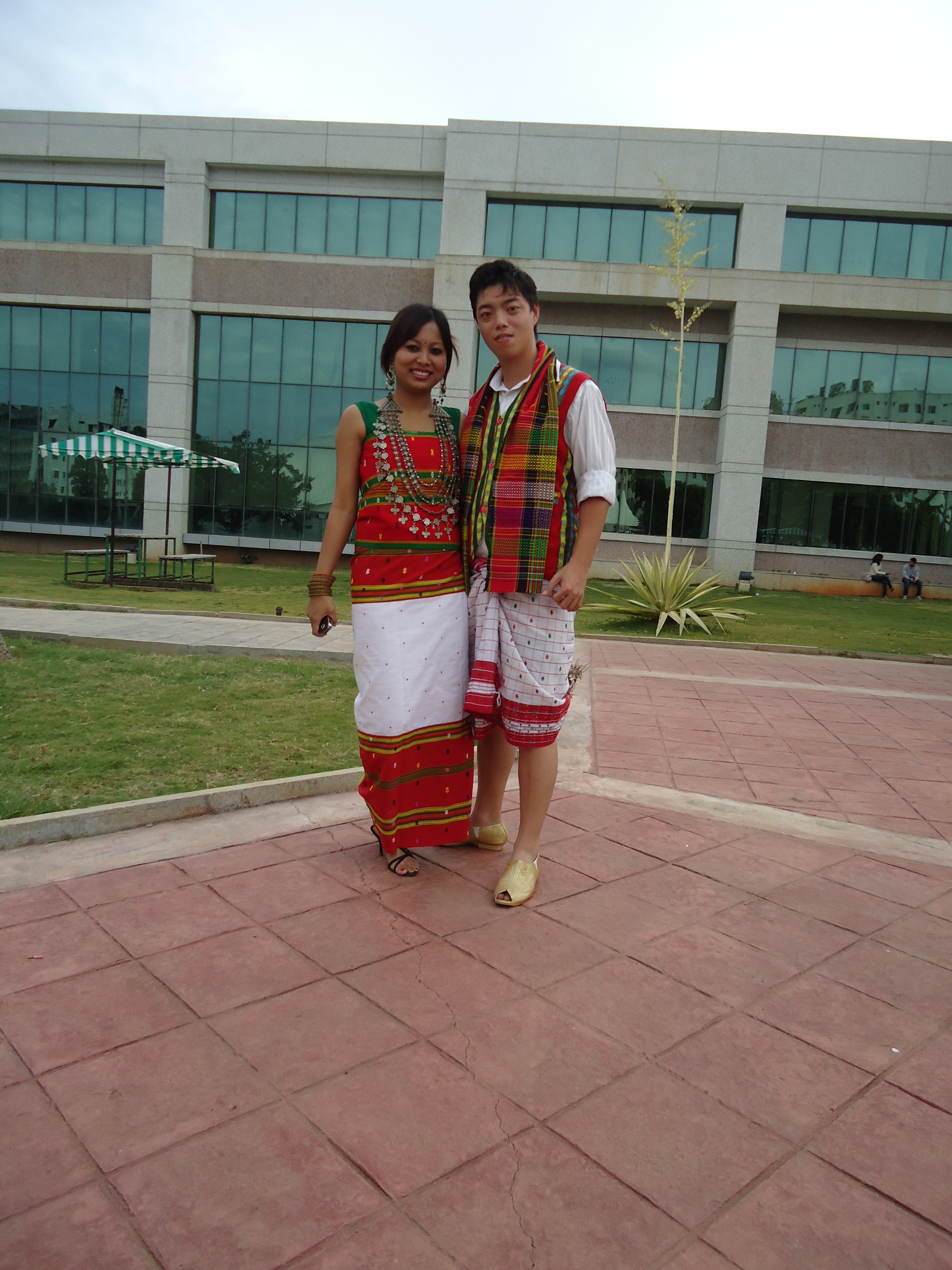
Tripuri couple in traditional attire

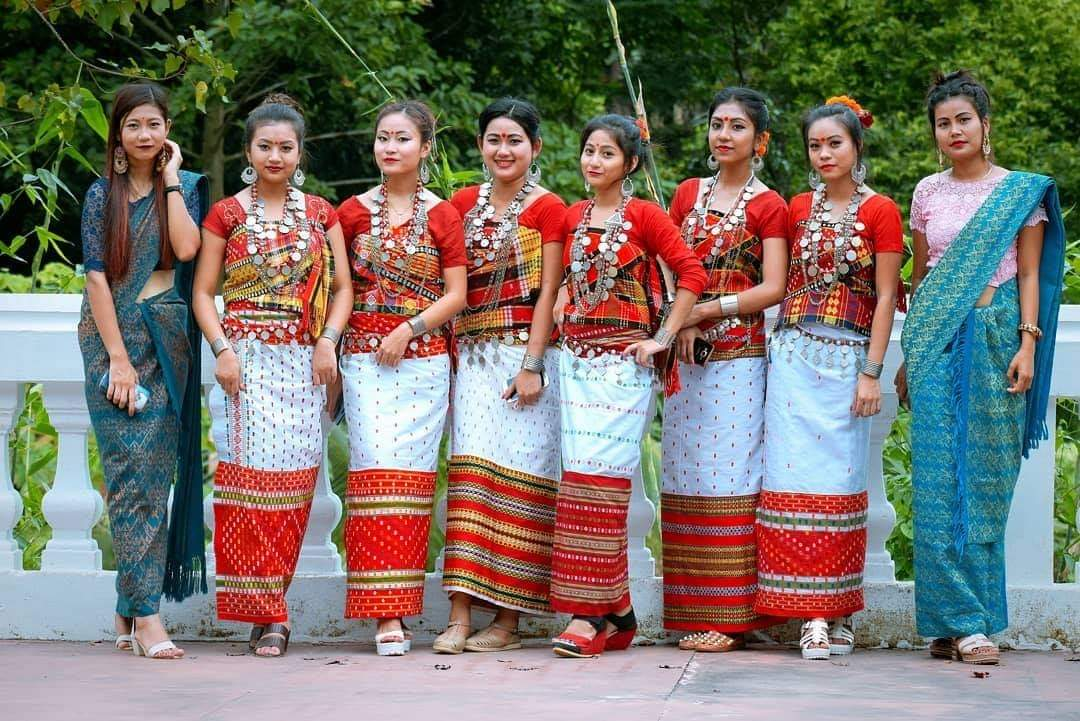
Tripuri girls in their traditional attire

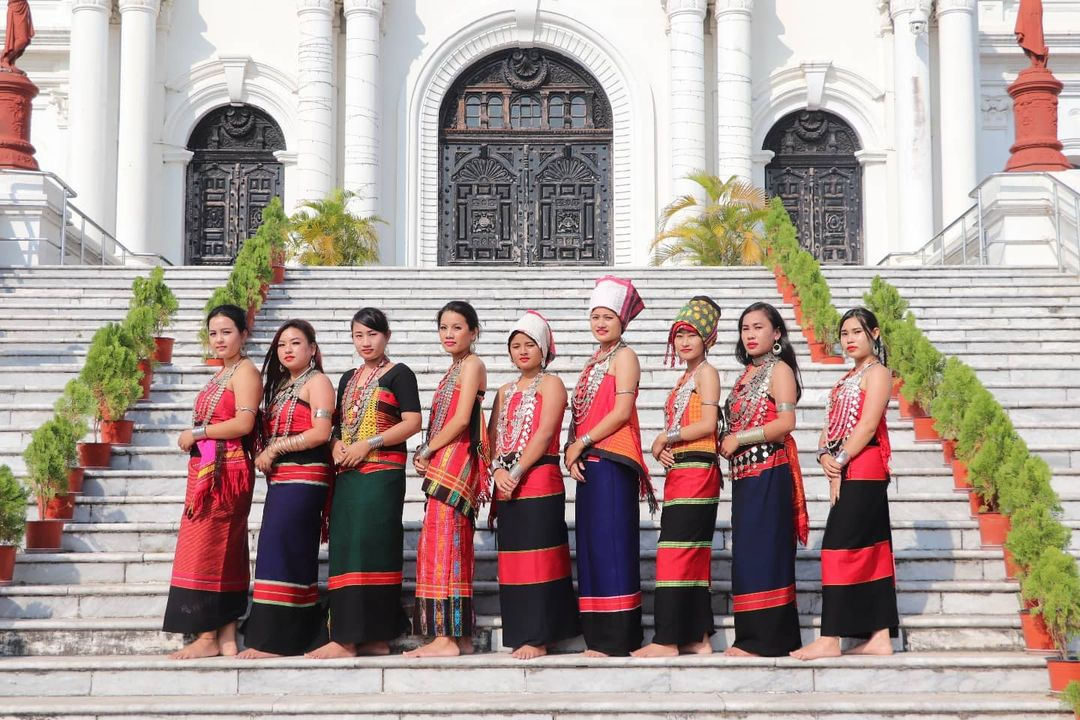
Tripura girls in their traditional attire

These indigenous communities enjoy their traditional freedom based on the concept of self-determination. The relation between the king and the subject communities was as Maharaja (king) of Tripura-Missip or liaison officer Roy or headman of the community – Sardar the chief of the village – the individual. Earlier, only the Debbarma or Tipra ethnic group was included in the Tripuri Kshatriya group. Later, the Raja included other groups like Reang, Jamatia and Noatia as well, in an attempt to foster a sense of kindness among the people under his region.

The Tripuri people have a rich historical, social, and cultural heritage which is totally distinct from that of the mainland Indians. Their distinctive culture – as reflected in their dance, music, festivals, management of community affairs, dress and food habits – has a strong base. Kokborok, the lingua franca of the 12 largest linguistic groups of the indigenous Tripuris and other dialects spoken in Tripura are of the Tibeto-Burman group and distinct from those spoken in India. There is no influence from those spoken by other peoples in the north-eastern region.

== Calendar ==
The Tripuris follow a traditional luni-solar calendar Tripurabda, which has 12 months and a 7-day week, like the Gregorian calendar.

The Tripura Era's New Year is on the 1st of Vaishakh which corresponds to 14 or 15 April of Common Era, depending on whether that year is a Leap year or not. The months are named in pan Indian months, time since its inception 1419 years back by Tripuri king Hamtor pha alias Himti pha alias Jujharu pha in 512 Saka Era.

== Notable people ==
=== Indian ===
- Bir Bikram Kishore Debbarman – 1908–1947, one of the last Kings of Tripura.
- Pradyot Bikram Manikya Deb Barma- Titular King and Current Head of Tripura Royal Family
- Sachin Dev Burman – Bollywood composer and singer.
- Rahul Dev Burman – Bollywood composer and singer.
- Kirit Bikram Kishore Deb Barman- Maharaja of Tripura (1947–2006), MP, and social activist.
- Bibhu Kumari Devi – Rajmata of Tripura
- Kanchan Prava Devi- Queen of Tripura.
- Radha Kishore Manikya- Maharaja of Tripura
- Birendra Kishore Manikya- Maharaja of Tripura
- Maha Manikya – Maharaja of Tripura
- Dharma Manikya I – Maharaja of Tripura
- Ratna Manikya I- Maharaja of Tripura
- Nabadwipchandra Dev Burman– Indian sitarist and Dhrupad singer
- Pratap Manikya- Maharaja of Tripura
- Sefali Debbarma-Kokborok poetess and novelist
- Bikashrai Debbarma, poet, writer, and composer
- Jishnu Dev Varma, Governor of Telangana, and Former Deputy Chief Minister of Tripura.
- Riya Sen Dev Varma – Bollywood actress.
- Raima Sen Dev Varma – Bollywood actress.
- Somdev Devvarman – Indian Tennis Player.
- Narendra Chandra Debbarma- Former Minister for Forests and Revenue, Government of Tripura.
- Dasarath Debbarma – Former Chief Minister of Tripura
- Aghore Debbarma- Former Minister for Tribal Welfare, Agriculture & Animal Resource Development, Government of Tripura.
- Jitendra Chaudhury- Member of the Tripura legislative assembly 2023
- Rebati Tripura- Former Member of Parliament (India) 2019-2024
- Sudhanwa Debbarma- Former Speaker of Tripura Legislative Assembly.
- Bidya Debbarma- Former Minister in Charge of Tribal Welfare, Govt of Tripura.
- Ranjit Debbarma- Member of the Tripura Legislative Assembly and former Command in General of All Tripura Tiger Force.
- Nagendra Jamatia- Former Minister for Agriculture & Horticulture, Govt of Tripura. Former Legislator of Tripura Legislative Assembly
- Benichandra Jamatia – Padma Shri Indian folk writer and litterateur
- Mevar Kumar Jamatia Former Minister of Tribal Welfare and Forest, Tripura.
- Satyaram Reang – Padma Shri Indian folk performer and folk artist
- Harinath Debbarma- Founder of TUJS
- Nanda Kumar Deb Barma– Kokborok Playwright and Composer.
- Manoranjan Debbarma Politician.
- Rashiram Debbarma – Former Minister of Ministry of Revenue, Govt of Tripura.
- Aghore Debbarma- Former Minister for Tribal Welfare, Agriculture and Animal Resources Development, Government of Tripura.
- Padma Kumar Debbarma
- Jashabir Tripura
- Ramendra Narayan Debbarma
- Radhacharan Debbarma -Former CEM of TTAADC
- Purna Chandra Jamatia -CEM of TTAADC
- Naresh Jamatia – Former Minister of Forest, Rural Development and Election, Govt of Tripura.
- Brishaketu Debbarma, Minister of State Industries and Commerce, Government of Tripura.
- Pranab Debbarma, former Member of Tripura Legislative Assembly.
- Ramendra Narayan Debbarma
- Jagadish Debbarma- Chairman of TTAADC and former MLA of Tripura Legislative Assembly.
- Pramod Reang, Politician and Member of Tripura Legislative Assembly
- Dr Atul Debbarma – Former Member of the Tripura legislative assembly
- Dhananjoy Tripura, Politician, former Vice-Chairman of Tripura Planning Commission and former Member of Tripura Legislative Assembly.
- Shyama Charan Tripura
- Manindra Reang Former Minister for Tribal Welfare (TRP & PTG), Home (Jail) and General Administration (Printing and Stationery), Government of Tripura.
- Dhirendra Debbarma
- Birendra Kishore Debbarma
- Burba Mohan Tripura
- Drao Kumar Riang
- Manoranjan Debbarma
- Gopi Nath Tripura
- Purna Mohan Tripura Former Minister of Finance and Power, Government of Tripura.
- Kesab Debbarma
- Prem Kumar Reang Former Ministry of Fisheries, Co-operation and Tribal Welfare (TRP & PTG), Government of Tripura.
- Rajeswar Debbarma
- Parimal Debbarma
- Sindhu Chandra Jamatia
- Daniel Jamatia
- Nagendra Jamatia Former Minister for Agriculture and Horticulture, Government of Tripura.
- Rabindra Debbarma– MLA
- Bajuban Reang – Former Member of the Parliament of India
- Kriti Devi Debbarman– Member of Parliament of the 18th Lok Sabha.
- Dipayan Debbarma, cricketer
- Manisankar Murasingh, cricketer
- Rita Debbarma, women's cricketer
- Laxmita Reang, women's footballer (India U17 international)
- Bijoy Debbarma, Prominent ophthalmologist, poet, novelist and activist.
- Sukhendu Debbarma, Professor and Dean of Tripura University.
- Naresh Chandra Dev Varma, writer and Padma Shri awardee
- Chandra Kumar Jamatia, Retired IAS and current member of Administrative Reforms Committee, TTAADC.

=== Bangladeshi ===
- Birendra Kishore Roaza, Former Member of Parliament.
- Sushanto Tripura, Bangladesh national team footballer
- Shobha Rani Tripura, Ekushey Padak recipient
- Jotindra Lal Tripura, Former Member of Parliament.
- Kujendra Lal Tripura, Politician, MP (Member of Parliament 299 Constituency) Khagrachari Hill District.
- Naba Bikram Kishore Tripura, Former Secretary, Former Additional Inspector General of Bangladesh Police

== See also ==
- Buisu
- Kokborok literature
- Manikya Dynasty
- Neer Mahal
- Tipraland
- Tripuri calendar
- Tripuri culture
- Tripuri nationalism
- Tripura rebellion
- Ujjayanta Palace
