= List of Tripuri writers =

This is an alphabetical, referenced list of notable Tripuri authors:

== Authors ==
- Bijoy Debbarma, novelist, poet, and activist
- Bikashrai Debbarma, Kokborok poet, critic, singer and songwriter
- Chandra Kanta Murasingh, poet and short stories writer
- Manas Debbarma, author, former UPSC member & Chairman of Tripura Public Service Commission
- Nanda Kumar Debbarma, poet and playwright
- Nagendra Jamatia, politician, novelist and short stories writer
- Narendra Deb Barma, poet, novelist, editor
- Sefali Debbarma, poet, novelist, and short stories writer
- Sudhanwa Debbarma, politician and novelist
- Sukhendu Debbarma, writer, historian and academic
