= Kokborok literature =

Kokborok (Tiprakok/Tripuri) is the native language of the Tripuri people in Tripura, a state in the northeast of India.

Little was written in Kokborok and until the end of the 19th century. The second half of the 20th century saw more vigorous development of Kokborok literature. The Tripura state Government recognised Kokborok as a state language in 1979.

== Early forms of literature ==
=== Oral traditions ===
Modern Kokborok literature is rooted in Tripuri oral traditions, including stories, songs and ballads, and ritual chants.

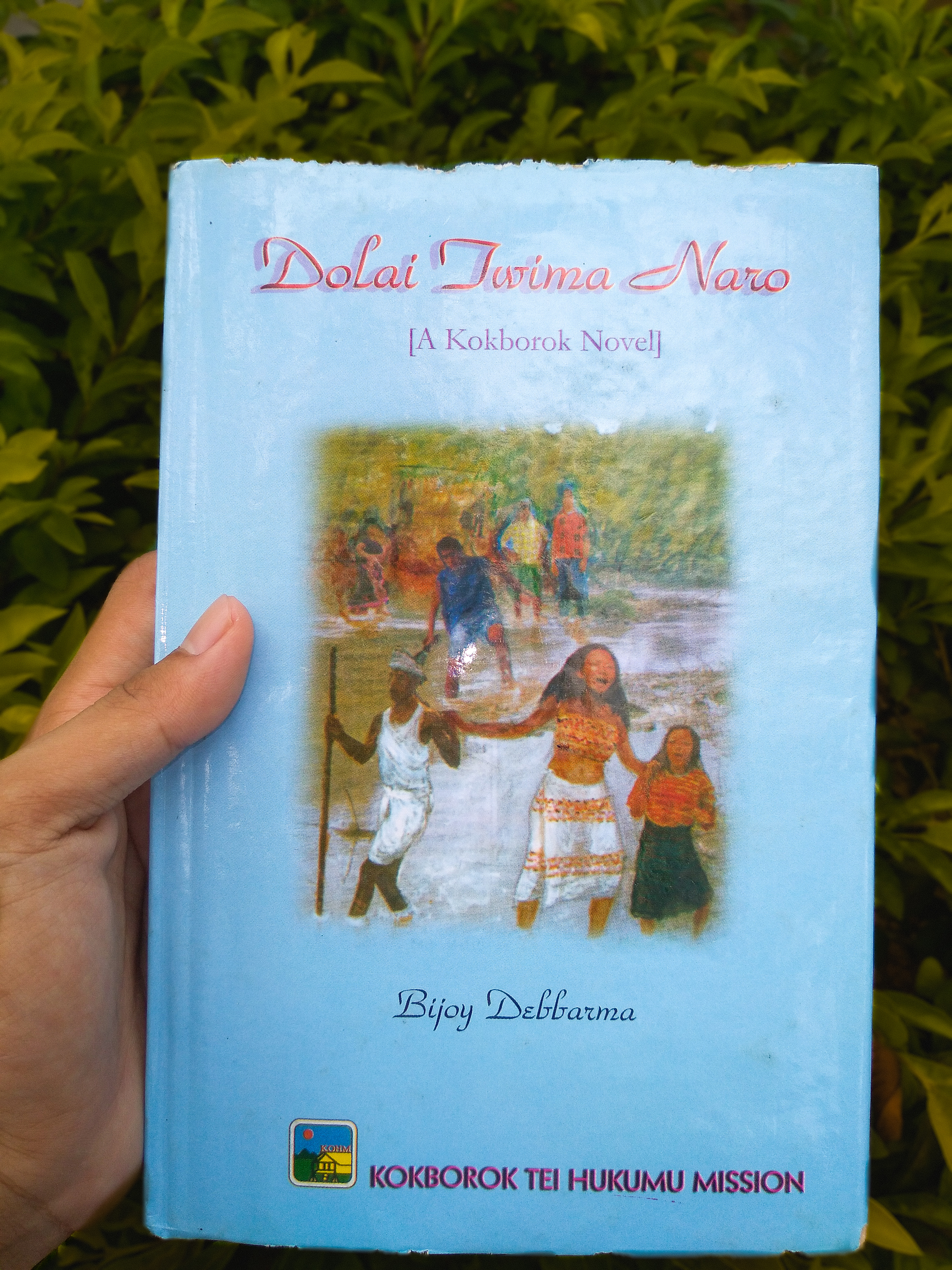
The novella Dolai Twima Naro (2008) by Bijoy Debbarma

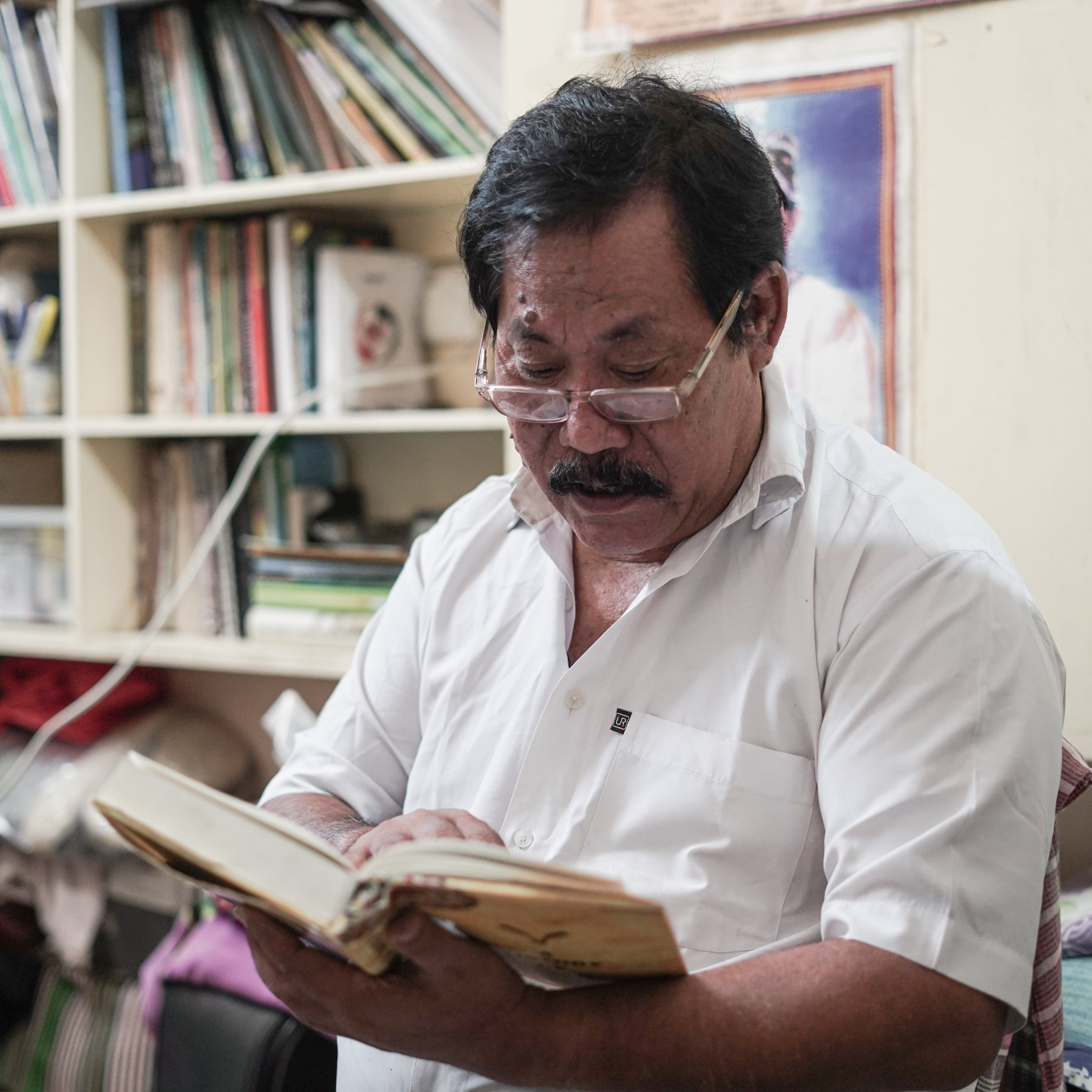
Kokborok poet and writer Bikashrai Debbarma

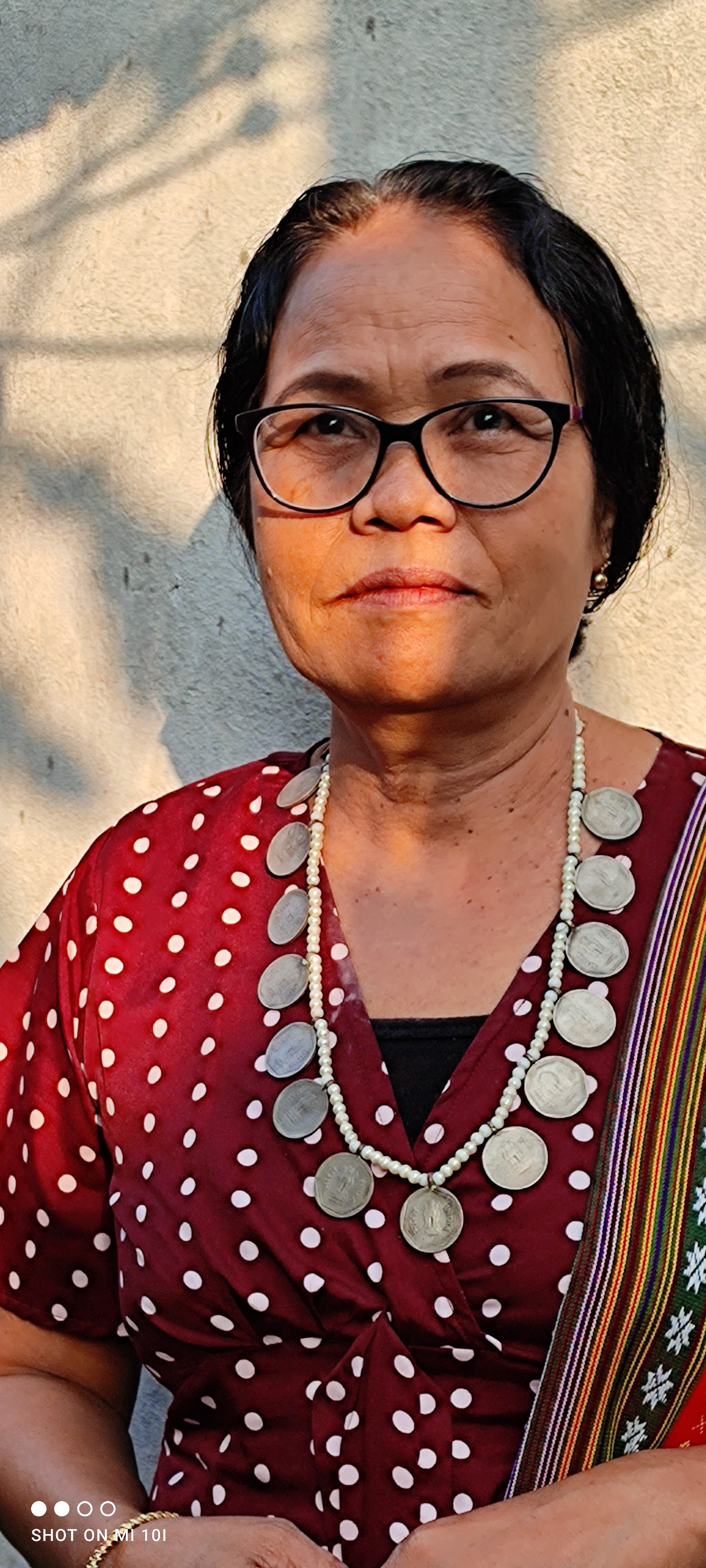
Novelist and Poet Sefali Debbarma

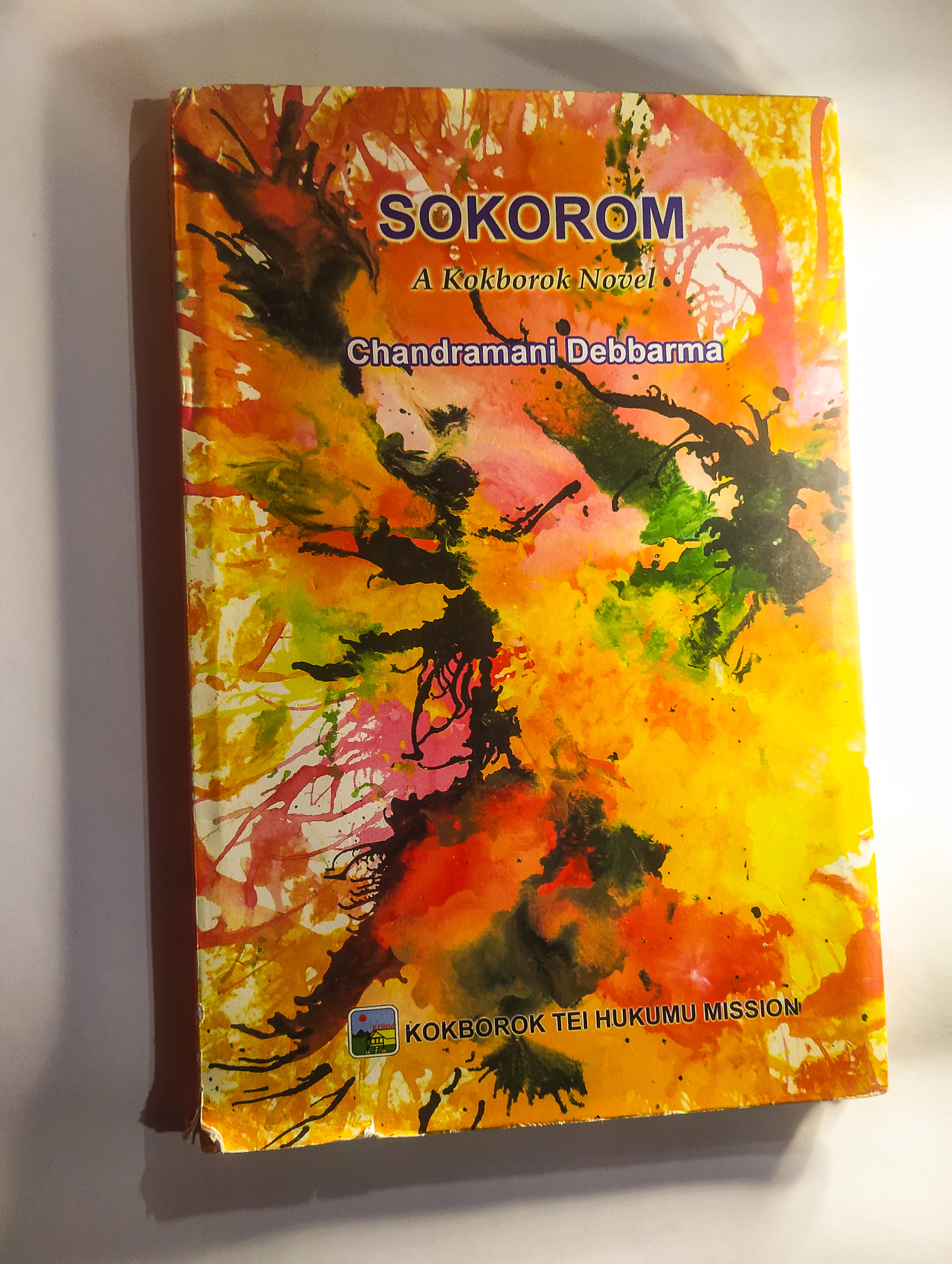
Sokorom, a Kokborok novel

=== Rajmala ===
Several lines in the Rajmala, a Bengali-language chronicle of the Kings of Tripura, indicate that it was translated from an older Kokborok (Tiprakok) version:

Purbe Rajmala chhilo Tripur bhashate,
Payar Gathilo sob sokole bhujhite,
Su-bhashate Dharmaraje Rajmala Koilo,
Rajmala boliya lockete hoilo."

- Rajmala - 2nd part, Dharma Manikya Chapter, page 6.

The meaning of the quotation is that the Rajmala had been in the Tripur language earlier. As ordered by the king Dharma Manikya, the chronicle was translated or written afresh in elegant language, i.e., in Bengali in the 14th century.

== 1890s-1940 ==
The turn of the 20th century saw several grammars of Kokborok, including Daulot Ahmed's Kokbokma (1897) and Radhamohan Thakur's Kok-Borokma (1900). Thakur also published two other books in Kokporok, Traipur Kothamala (1906) and Traipur Bhasabidhan (1907).

== 1945-1950s ==
Khushikrshna, a disciple of Ratnamani, a well-known personality to the people of Tripura, contributed to a compilation of 33 spiritual songs in Kokborok under the title Tripura Kha-Khachangma Khumber Boi, published in 1942.

On 27 December 1945, the Tripura Janasiksha Samiti was established. The organization founded many schools across Tripura.

During this period there were some other persons and activists who played a vital role for development of the Kokborok language and literature. Bangshi Thakur (Amarendra Deb Barma) became popular in Agartala town and rural areas for his composition of Holi (color festival) songs in Kokborok. He wrote many Kokborok poems; in 1948, his Koktang Kului, a brief Kokborok grammar and translation book, was published.

Following Tripura's incorporation into India in late 1949, cementing Tripuri oral traditions in written form became a stronger cultural priority. This period was also marked by intense discussions surrounding what script should be used for Kokborok; although earlier writing had used the Bengali script, this was viewed as not optimal due to its inability to capture some phonemes in Kokborok.

Sudhir Krishna Deb Barma was a renowned writer, vocalist and linguist. He wrote two books: Koktang (1954) and Surungma Yakhili (1962).

Mahendra Deb Barma published his textbook for children, Cherai Surungma, in 1958.

Journalist Ajit Bandhu Deb Barma published two books in the 1960s: Kok-Surungma (Bagsa and Bagnui) in 1963 and Kokrobam, a Kokborok dictionary, in 1967.

Alindralal Tripura was the founder of the "Kokborok Sahitya Sabha". He wrote many books and plays, among them Lamani Homchang, performed in 1972.

Sonacharan Debbarma composed songs in the 1950s and published them under the title Firogoi Faidi.

Books such as Bharatni Panchali, Ramayan Kocharjak and Yapri Kwtal were also published by the State Education Department.

=== Kwtal Kothoma ===
The first Kokborok magazine, Kwtal Kothoma debuted in 1954, produced by Sudhanwa Debbarma. The magazine published folk songs, folk tales and articles. Some notable pieces published serially in the magazine were:

- Chethuang, a novel by Sudhanwa Debbarma
- Phunukmung, collection of riddles in Kokborok
- Gandhiji Koklam, a talk on Mahatma Gandhi by Dasrath Deb Barma

== 1960s-1970s ==
The 1960s and 1970s witnessed a nationalistic movement led by the Twipra Students Federation. Two organisations established in this period substantially aided the development of Kokborok literature and culture. Tripura Kokborok Unnayan Parishad was established under Bir Chandra Deb Barma in 1967. The organisation published the book Tripura Kokborok Bhashar Likhito Rupe Uttaran in 1972. The other organisation, Tripura Kokborok Sahitya Sabha, was founded by Sailendralal Tripura and Alindralal Tripura. This organisation published Tripura Somhita, a book on Tripuri philosophy, in 1967, and Srungsama in 1973, the latter was published by the Tripura Baptist Literature Society.

Another notable publication was Khani Ruchapmung, a collection of 17 Kokborok songs by Budurai, Kok-Borok Swrung, written in Roman script by Dasaratha Deb Barma and published in 1977, and Bubar by Monoranjan Deb Barma, published in 1978.

The most influential Kokborok literary work of this period was the Smai Kwtal, the New Testament of the Bible in Kokborok language, published in 1976 by the Bible Society of India.

== 1980s ==
The 1980s saw the consequence of the education thrust by the Tripura Janasiksha Samiti and earlier literary organisations. Many educated Tripuri people began writing and publishing their own works, further encouraged by the recognition of Kokborok as a state language. Many literary magazines were popular in this decade, including Lama of the Tripura Upajati Ganamukti Parishad, Chati of Kokborok Sahitya-O-Sanskriti Samsad and Dangdu 1985 of Tripura Rajya Kokborok Sahitya Sabha.

=== Novels ===
- Hachuk Khurio (In the lap of Hills) by Sudhanwa Debbarma; the first modern Kokborok novel. It was published by the Kokborok Sahitya Sabha and Snskriti Samsad in 1987.
- Tongthai Naitungnani ("In search of above") by Shyamlal Deb Barma; published serially in Lama, a literary magazine.

=== Short stories ===
- Dundurkma, a compilation of 12 short stories by Shyamlal Debbarma, was published in 1984
- Adong, published 1987, was eddited by Debbarma
- Nakhwrai, a compilation of four stories by Binoy Deb Barma, published 1989.
- Elemni Bibi, a compilation of eight stories by Haripada Deb Barma, published 1989.

=== Poetry ===
- Kok-Borok Koklob Bwchab (A collection of poems) in 1983 edited by Naresh Chandra Dev Varma and Shyamlal Debbarma
- simalwng sakao holongni Khum (Flower of stone on a crematorium) in 1984 by Nanda Kumar Deb Barma
- Kogtang-Koklob Bwtang (collection of poems and rhymes) in 1983 and Muktwi by Santimoy Chakraborty
- Luku Sochama Rwchabmung (Songs of the masses) by Mahendra Deb Barma in 1984.
- Ha Kwchak (Red Soil) 1983 by Sudhanya Tripura
- Nwng Hamjakma Rwya 1988 by Sudhanya Tripura
- Ang bai Kwkharang twini khorang in 1986 by Sudhanya Tripura
- Rwchapmung by Sudhanya Tripura
- Haping Garingo Chibuksa Ringo 1987 by Chandra Kanta Murasing
- Kolomtwi Kisi Mwkhang 1986 by Chandra Kanta Murasing
- Bolong Kwkhrang 1987 by Chandra Kanta Murasing
- Sonnet Koktangrog by Binoy Deb Barma 1988.
- Kungkila Nwng twmani aswk pung by Narendra Deb Barma 1988.
- Horni boro or Sangh tram panchali by Alindralal Tripura
- Bolongni Bwsajwksong mwsao by Nanada Kumar Deb Barma 1988
- Kok-Borok Gono Sangit by Shyamlal Deb Barma 1988.

=== Other ===
- Tripurani Kereng Kotoma 1980 by Santimoy Chakraborty
- Kok-Borok Geeta by Nanda Kumar Deb Barma 1988
- Nok Arini Kothoma
- Kok-Borok bai Rabindranath in 1986 by Shyamlal Deb Barma
- Takhumsa Bodo 1989 l by Narendra Chandra Deb Barma.

== 1990s ==
The 1990s saw the official adoption of the Roman script for Kokborok writing by the Tripura Tribal Areas Autonomous District Council.

=== Novels ===
- Hachuk Khurio (In the lap of Hills), 2nd part, 1994 by Sudhanwa Debbarma
- Khong in 1996 by Shyamlal Deb Barma.

=== Short stories ===
Belonia, 1994 by Nagendra Jamatia, Mokol Bwskango 1994 and Biyal 1997 and Chethuang Tolao 2000 by Snehamoy Roy Choudhury, Bolongni Khum 1996 and Busu 2000 by Sunil Deb Barma, Swkal jwkma 1998 by Bijoy Deb Barma, Naphurai Jamatia and Rabindra Kishore Deb Barma. Osthirog 2000 by Biswa Kumar Deb Barma, Jalai Tokpuku 2000 by Haripada Deb Barma and Naithok 1998 by Naphurai Jamatia and Ashok Deb Barma.kerang the great 2015 by nanda kumar Debbarma

=== Poetry ===
- Ani Ganao Ang and Ani Rwchabmung 2000 by Nanda Kumar Deb Barma
- Himalayni Bedek Buprao 1991 and Love-ism 1995 by Chandramani Deb Barma
- Dormo Lam boy Kok-Borok Baul 1992 by khajual Jamatia
- Khumpui Barrwrwk 1995 by Kokborok tei Hukumu Mission
- Vakharai 1996 by Kumud Ranjan Deb Barma
- Nono Rikha Khumpui 1997
- Jaduni Khorang 200 by Sudhanya Tripura
- Bolong Muphunjak Yakbai 1998 by Bikashroy Deb barma
- Longtrainin Eklobyo 1998 by Bijoy Deb Barma
- Lok Chethuang Lok 1999
- Pindi Uatwi Pin 1999 by Chandrakanta Murasing
- Sinijak Kwrwi Bumui 2000 by Kunja Bihari Deb Barma
- Kokthiarog thwngo bonbonia 2000 by Shyamlal Deb Barma.

=== Others ===
Some of the translation books were Komola Kantoni Doptar 1992 by Nagendra Chandra Deb Barma, Mangni Uansokthani Geeta 1997 by Annaprasad Jamatia and Lobmung Bwchab (Psalms) by Tripura Baptist Christian Union. Other prominent books are Kwrak Kothoma 1995 by Krishnadhan Jamatia, Anglo-Kokborok Dictionary 1996 by Binoy Deb Barma, Phukmung 1994 by Kokborok tei Hukumu Mission, Kokboroni Rangchak-richak 1994 by Binoy Deb Barma, Mahatma Gandhi 1995 by Sukanta Deb Barma, Kokborokni Kokrok Kisa 1996 by Nitai Acharjee, Sachlang Jorani Imangni Kumpui 1997 by Bimal Deb Barma, Kokborok Sikhum 1997 by Rabindra Kishore Deb Barma and Bemar Tai Bini Hamrimung 1999 by Nilmani Deb Barma.

== 21st century ==
The new century started with publications of Kokborok Dictionary and the History Chronicle of the Tripura Kingdom, Rajmala, in Kokborok.

=== Dictionary ===
The 21st century began for Kokborok literature with the monumental work, the Anglo-Kokborok-Bengali Dictionary compiled by Binoy Deb Barma and published in 2002 by the Kokborok tei Hukumu Mission. This is the 2nd edition of his previous ground breaking dictionary published in 1996 and is a trilingual dictionary.

A concise Kokborok-English-Bengali Dictionary also by Binoy Debbarma was published in 2001 by the Language Wing, Education Department of Tripura Tribal Areas Autonomous District Council, Khumulwng.

=== General ===
Twiprani Laihbuma (The Rajmala - History of Tripura) translated by R.K Debbarma and published in 2002 by KOHM. Dr. B. R. Ambedkor 2001 by Chandra Bala Debbarma also by KOHM, Thangphlaihni Bithilwng (The Borok herbal medicine) 2002, Bubagratang (Rajmala) in 2009 by Atul Debbarma, Mao Tse Tung in 2014 by Shyamlal Debbarma, Bugrakotor Alekjanser in 2014 by Rabindra Kishore Debbarma.

Tales and Tunes of Tripura Hills: An anthology of Kokborok Folk Songs, Myths and Tales, Proverbs and Riddles. The translated works by Poet Chandra Kanta Murasingh is the first book in Kokborok published by the Sahitya Akademi.

=== Novels ===
- Rung (2001) by Nanda Kumar Debbarma
- Mwnakni Pohor (2002) by Kunjabehari Debbarma
- Langmani Rukungo (2003) by Sunil Debbarma
- 1980 (2006) by Atul Debbarma
- Tongthai Naitugwi (2007) by Shyamlal Debbarma
- Dolai Twima Naro 2008 by Bijoy Debbarma
- KOHM and Lokhopoti (2010) by Sefali Debbarma

=== Short stories ===
- Jalai Tokpupu (2000) by Haripad Debbarma
- Basulam (2001) and Mo salni pohoro(2003)by Kunjabihari Debbarma
- Imangni Yakhili 2001 by Narendra Debbarma
- Yamroksa 2002 by Binoy Deb Barma
- Holong Beserni Khum 2002 by Rebati Debbarma
- Hachukni Muktwi (2002) by Rabindra Kishore Debbarma
- Toksa Tiyari 2004
- Toksa Hakaya (2006) by Atul Debbarma
- Phola Kaithamni Kothoma 2007
- Kothomani Hayung (2010) by Gopal Debbarma
- Nokhaisa Kerang Kothoma 2011 by Bijoy Debbarma
- Busu (2000) by Sunil Debbarma
- Khumpui Barrwrwk Twiyung Torrwrwk (2014)
- Hatal Khamchuru Bahai (2014) by Sefali Debbarma.

=== Poetry ===
- Sana Muchungbo Sajakya Kokrok 2002 by Sona Charan Debbarma
- Kokthai Kwchambai Rwchapmung Kokblob 2006 by Mrinal Kanti Debbarma
- Nono Rwkha Khumbubar Barsa 2006 by Dr. Sudhanya Debbarma
- Rwchapmung Borok Jaduni 2006 by Kwlwi Debbarma
- Nwng Rwchablangmani Kokthairok 2006 compiled by Bimal Debbarma
- Mun Dodoro Mun 2010 by Narendra Debbarma
- Dumburni Muktwi 2011 and Nini Rang Thaisa Buini Rang Khokba 2012 by Prasenjit Debbarma
- Chokhreng 2012 by Binoy Debbarma.

=== Baibel Kwthar ===
The full Bible was published in Kokborok for the first time in 2013 by the Bible Society of India after the earlier publication of the New Testament in Kokborok called the Smai Kwtal in 1976.

The translation team of the Bible from the Tripura Baptist Christian Union (TBCU) were:

1. Rev. Jong Bahadur Debbarma, CBA (who was also part of the previous Smai Kwtal translation team)
2. Rev. Anil Debbarma, CBA
3. Rev. Nilmani Debbarma, SNBA
4. Mark Debbarma, CBA

Baibel Kwthar is currently the largest work and biggest book published in the language with more than 1,300 pages.

=== Translated works ===
The Language Wing of the Tripura Tribal Autonomous Districts Council (TTAADC), Khumulwng has been instrumental in bringing out major translated works of books in other languages in Kokborok. Some of the major translations are Veniceni Baniyasa (2007) by Jasuda Reang of Merchant of Venice by William Shakespeare, Gura (2007) by Laxmidhan Murasing of Gora by Rabindranath Tagore, Srikanta Part - I of Sarat Chandra Chattopadhyay (2009) by Shyamlal Debbarma, Robinson Crusoe in Kokborok (2009) by Purna Chandra Debbarma, Boltayerni Kandid (A translation of Candide of Voltaire in Kokborok) (2014) by Santosh Debbarma, Somerset Momni Kothomarok (2014) by Suprava Debbarma, etc.

=== Compilations ===
The new century saw the publishing of many compilations of works by Kokborok authors of various genres of poetry, drama, short stories, essays and folk tales in single volumes such as: An Anthology of Kokborok Poems (2009) by Binoy Debbarma, Rangbwtang (2011) by Dipankar Chakraborty, Surang (2014) and Suri (2015) by Suranjan Kundu Choudhury, and Thungnuk Bwchap (2015) by Nanda Kumar Debbarma.

== 2020s ==
- Tipra Bisi Tei Lekhamung Raida (2020) by Mg. Narendra Debbarma
- Tutankhamun ni Pyramid (2022) by Bg. Bikashrai Debbarma
- Chirik Morok (2022): The Kokborok Poetry Anthology by Bg. Bikash Roy Debbarma and Bg Nanda Kumar Deb Barma.
- Yokmarini Kokthai (2024): A historical events of missionary entrance and its activities in Tripura compiled by Life Dn. Abhijit Debbarma

== See also ==
- Tripuri people

== Bibliography ==
- Kokborok Literature - A century's development, by N.C. Deb Barma, "Tui" Magazine, Tribal research Institute, Agartala.
- Tripura-e Kokborok Chorcha, by Ramprasad Dutta.
- Cinema as Art and Popular Culture in Tripura: An Introduction, Aloy Deb Barma, Prajapita Debroy, TRI, Agartala.
