= Kokborok orthography =

Writing system of Kokborok

Within Kokborok-speaking communities, several writing systems have been used in the orthography of the language, including usage of the Bengali, Devanagari, and Latin scripts, as well as a lesser-used native script. The issue of which script to use for Kokborok has provoked political controversy.

== Background ==
The line of the Ganamukti Parishad of Dasarath Deb was that Bengali script ought to be used for the language. That policy is the one implemented by the Left Front government in Tripura. The ethno-nationalist opposition, such as INPT, advocates usage of Latin script.

Since 1900 AD started with the pioneer in Tripuri/Kokborok Radhamohan Thakur, until recently most of the literary work had largely been done in Bengali script. There have also been attempts to create an entirely new script for the language. The most notable one was constructed by Alinda Tripura. It is however, not in use.

== Recent developments ==
In the 21st century, a substantial amount of Kokborok literature has been in the Latin script and Kokborok alphabet. In 2004, a statewide movement called Movement for Kokborok was launched by various organisations and societies in Tripura, prominently by Kokborok society of India, Kokborok tei Hukumu Mission and Twipra Students Federation demanding the inclusion of Kokborok at the University level and its adoption as an official language of India (which had been accorded to its sister language, Bodo in 2020). The case for Latin script has been widened by the fact that the largest dictionary in the language has been published by KOHM in the script since 1995, with an even larger second edition published in 2003. The Dictionary has become a somewhat official reference of the Tripuri people for Kokborok words and usage.

After the 2018 election, in which the BJP replaced the Left government, it has been suggested that the state government has favored the use of the Devanagari script over Bengali for the language.

== Movement for Kokborok ==
The Movement for Kokborok organised a national seminar in 2004 which was held at Umakanta Academy, Agartala and had speakers from various Central Universities and Institutes of India advocating the use of Roman script for Kokborok and also on issues for its speedy development in Education for earlier recognition by the Central Government.

== In education ==
The state Government have been teaching in the schools at secondary, higher secondary and at college level in Bengali script only. The Tripura Tribal Areas Autonomous District Council meanwhile has adopted the Roman script in the schools run by it in two-thirds of the state since 1992.

== Kokborok script ==
Kokborok has an original script known as Koloma or Aima which is not in popular use. Since the 19th century the Kingdom of Twipra used the Bengali script for writing in Kokborok.

The Latin script started to be used for writing Kokborok during the former British empire that ruled Tripura. Since the independence of India from the British Empire (followed by the separation of Bangladesh, but the merger of Tripura with India, and not with Bangladesh or with Burma), the Latin script is being promoted by non-governmental organisations. The Tripura Tribal Areas Autonomous District Council (TTAADC) government had made regulations in 1992 and 2000 for adoption of Latin script in the school education system in its areas.
