= Debbarma =

Family name

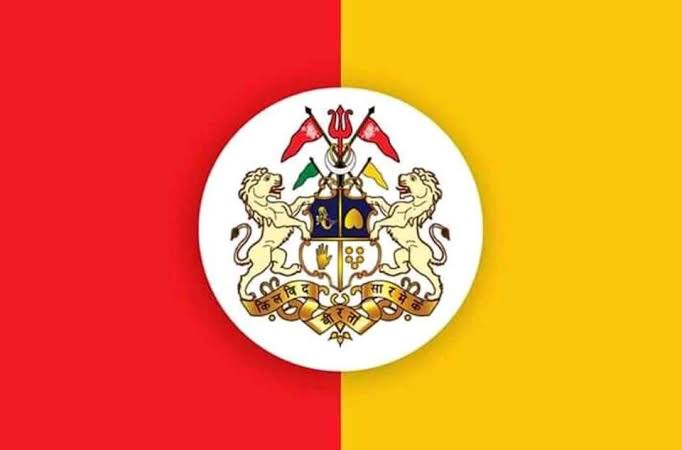

Profile
- Country: India
- Region: Tripura
- Ethnicity: Tripuri

Chief
- Maharaja Pradyot Bikram Kishore Manikya Debbarma

Debbarma is the main clan of Tripuri community, predominantly in state of Tripura, India and Bangladesh who speak Kokborok, a Tibeto-Burman language.

== Variations ==
The variations of "Debbarma" consist of Debbarma, Deb Barma, DebBarma, Dev Barma, Dev Varma, Deb Burman, Dev Burman, Debbarman, Dev Barman, Dev Varman and Devvarman.

== Classifications ==
Although Debbarmas speak Kokborok, some differences in their accents can be found if observed carefully. The way they speak it varies in tones and words too. The accent of someone residing in the north can vary significantly if compared to someone residing in the south.

These Include:

- Daspa
- Beri
- Dona

== Notable people ==
- Bir Bikram Kishore Debbarma (1908–1947), one of the last Kings of Tripura.
- Pradyot Bikram Manikya Deb Barma, TIPRA Motha, Chairman and the current head of Tripura Royal House.
- Sachin Dev Burman, Bollywood composer and singer.
- Rahul Dev Burman, Bollywood composer and singer.
- Dasarath Debbarma, (1993-1998) first and yet only Tripuri Chief Minister of Tripura.
- Jishnu Debbarma, 4th Governor of Telangana, and former Deputy Chief Minister Of Tripura Government. He is the youngest son of Maharaj Kumari Kamal Prabha Devi, the single sister of Maharaja Bir Bikram Manikya Debbarma (last king of Tripura).
- Kriti Devi Debbarman, Member of Tripura Royal Family and MP Tripura East constituency.
- Atul Debbarma, sitting MLA from the Krishnapur constituency. Indian doctor-turned-politician, writer, author, activist, statesman, founder of Tripur Kshatriya Samaj, Subrai Mission Trust, Subrai Vidya Mandir, Agartala. He published a Kokborok translation of the Bhagavad Gita with in-depth analysis. He translated the Rajmala (The Royal Chronicle of Tripura) and the Tripur Samhita to Kokborok.
- Raima Sen Dev Varma, Bollywood actress.
- Riya Sen Dev Varma, Bollywood actress.
- Somdev Devvarman, Indian tennis player. Debbarman created history by becoming the first Indian to win a gold medal in the men's singles tennis event of the Asian Games. In 2011, Devvarman received the Arjuna Award from the Indian government for his tennis successes. In March 2017, the Ministry of Youth Affairs and Sports, Government of India, appointed him as the national observer for tennis. In 2018, he was awarded with the civilian award Padma Shri.
- Harinath Debbarma, politician, activist, statesman, author from Tripura.
- Bikashrai Debbarma, poet, author, and language activist from Tripura.
- Nanda Kumar Deb Barma, playwright, poet and lyricist.
- Sukhendu Debbarma, Professor and Dean of Tripura University.

== See also ==
- Tripura
- Kokborok language
- Tripuri people
- Twipra Kingdom
- Buisu
