= Kokborok Day =

Indian festival

Kokborok Day (Tripuri language Day) is a festival celebrated in the Indian state of Tripura to celebrate the development of the Kokborok language. It is observed on 19 January every year. The Kokborok language is an official language in Tripura. This day is chosen to commemorate its initial recognition as an official language in 1979. The activities include cultural programmes and literary activities.

== Kokborok ==
Kokborok/Tripuri is the native language of Tripura, spoken for thousands of years among the Tripuri community of Tripura. It is one of the ancient language of North East India. Kok means language and borok means people. Kokborok was formerly known as Tiprakok/Tripurikok. Kokborok (Tripuri) is one of the Tibeto-Burman languages widely spoken in the Northeastern part of India in the state of Tripura and neighbouring CHT hill tracts of Bangladesh. The Kokborok language is one of the fastest growing and developing Tibeto-Burman languages in the region. The language is spoken mainly by the Tripuri clans like Debbarma, Kalai, Reang, Jamatia, Tripura, Noatia, Rupini, Murasing and Uchoi. The community who speak Kokborok is Tripuri community. All the people who speak Kokborok are known as "Tripuris".

It is mentioned in the chronicle of the Tripura Kings who were the Tripuri rulers (184 kings) of Tripura for more than two thousand years that "Koloma" was the script of Kokborok. The revival of the script is in process. The script of the Kokborok is not yet finalised due to many socio-political debates, but many people prefer writing it in "Latin script".

"Kokborok tei Hukumu Mission", many government and non-government groups are continuously involved in promoting and developing Kokborok language, art, literature, and films/songs through cultural revolution. The people of Tripura achieved them all to which that the Kokborok language has been taught in government schools, colleges, and universities. The effort is still being made to further to improve the language and to bring it into the mainstream.

== See also ==
- Kokborok
- Tripuri
