= Kokborok drama =

Drama was brought into the Kokborok-speaking population by the Yatra (Jatra) performers of Bengal. The rulers of Independent Tripura were the first to present and perform drama in Tripura. Though in the beginning the presentations of yatras (jatras) were limited to the Royal Compound, in course of time it came out of the royal compound and mass people also began to enjoy it and join it.

== History ==
Having the basic foundation to perform in the open-air theatre, Kokborok-speaking people came to compose and present drama in their language during the period of the Tripura Janasiksha Samiti Movement (1945-late 1950s). "Agiya Chalo" written by Sudhanya Debbarma was the first drama in Kokborok.

After "Agiye Chalo" "Lamani Homchang" was presented in 1973 by the Kokborok Sahitya Sabha, written and directed by Alindab Tripura. In the middle 1970s many groups came to present theatre using modern style, sound and music, etc. "Thwi Phuta" was one of the popular ones during this time, as also "Somaj Kiphildi" and "Yamorok". Hemanta Jamatia, a renowned musician and actor became very popular at this time due to his acting in "Thwi Phuta" and has also been awarded by the Sahitya Academy.

== Modern drama ==
"Nobar Domsani Kothoma" composed by Nanda Kumar Deb Barma was presented by Kokborok Sahitya Sabha in 1983. They also organised a Kokborok Drama Festival from 1988 and exposed many groups and talented artists to the audience. Some of the groups have been awarded at the national level in India. Kokborok Sahitya Sabha also presented a drama "Kwplai" by Nanda Kumar Debbarma at Tezpur, Assam in 1989.

"Lampra (theatre group)" another theatre group started productions in 1990s with the most attractive "Chamari Ompa" Lampra won first prize in Yatra Utsav 1995 with the marvellous production "Chethuang", based on a popular Kokborok folk tale. "Tiyari Drama and Cultural Centre" won second prize in 1996 with "Khumpui". Since then, they have produced many popular plays like "Swkal", "Kuchuk Kherembar", "Kuchuk Ha-Sikam" etc. Ruhi Debbarma is the pioneer and organising personality of Tiyari.

"Sampili Theatre Centre" formed in 1997 has presented excellent dramas in this short period, including tele-serials such as "Rung", "Imangni Bwsarok", "Longtoraini Eklobyo". All these above-mentioned groups are based in Agartala the capital city. Others such as "Khorang" of Mandai, "Dugmali Cultural troupes" of Abhichoran Bazaar are also leading groups.

== Future ==
In such a short period of history Kokborok has developed a quite modern drama groups and talents at both regional and national levels without much support from the state government. Regular workshops, symposia, discussions and festivals regarding Kokborok drama are being encouraged now by the people.

== Eminent personalities of Kokborok drama ==
- Nanda Kumar Deb Barma, awarded "Mahendra Smriti Puraskar" for Drama).

Bubar, Mukunne, Kokkisa, Koktanghai, Mari, Randijwkma, Sikhok, Reg-Swnam, Bolongni Muktarwi Sarao, Koktun Khotalbai, Kwplai, Kantomoni, Imangni Bwsarok, Shehi Bukhukswk Ha, Nuai, Rung, Sundurjak, Yapiri, Dogar, Longtoraini Eklobyo, Bwsak Kaisao, Da-kuphur, Chobani Swkang, Swkango Choba, Kotor Buma-Bwsa

- Madhu Sudan Debbarma, awarded first prize in Yubo Utsav, Bhopal for Chamari Ompai; Chethuang, Eklobya, Kwkharang Siyal, etc.
- Ruhi Debbarma, awarded 2nd prize in Yuba Utsav 1996; Khumpui, Buini Hambara, Baithang Dogwra, Kuchuk Kheregbar, Kuchuk Ha-Sikam, Swkal, etc

== See also ==
- Tripura
- Kokborok
- Kokborok Literature
- Tripuri culture
- Kokborok cinema
