= Jamatia Hoda =

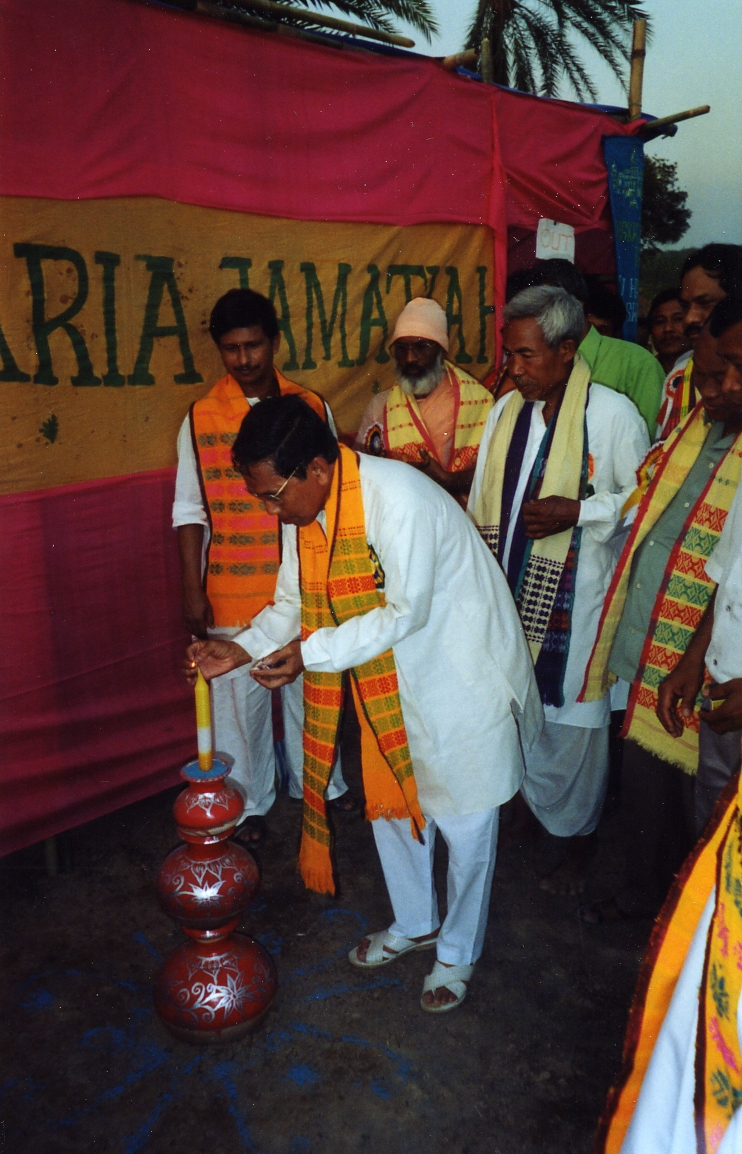
Baba Goria celebrations of the Jamatia Hoda

Jamatia Hoda is the institution that looks after the rights and safeguard of the culture of the Jamatia clan of Tripuri community. It has head-office in Atharobla in Udaipur town of South Tripura district of Tripura and a branch office at Khejurbagan, Agartala near Sri Krishna Mission School. It has also started a higher secondary school named Garia Academy. in Atharobla. It is affiliated to CBSE board.

== History ==
Tripura was once a princely state ruled by Twipra Kingdom until it merged with the Union of India in 1949. The Jamatias are, in the numerical strength, the third among the Tripuri community of Tripura. Today, the Jamatias are, like others of their kind, in transition, inevitably exposed, as they are, to the influences of modernity and social forces. Though, the definition of the term "Jamatia" is still shrouded in mystery, the history of Tripura upholds the existence of the people known as "Jamatias". According to "Rajmala", the Jamatias were the most important fighting clan of Tripura during the reign of the early kings. The army constituted by them was called Jamat and from word Jamat, they later on came to be known as Jamatias. Tripura District Gazetteer records, "the term Jamatia has originated from the term Jamayet which means gathering or mobilization". According to Jamatias themselves, the word Jamatia is derived from the word "Jama" and "Twia", Jama means Tax and Twia means "not to bear the burden of". Thus the word Jamatia means a person who does not bear the burden of "taxes". To some, the appellation "Jamatia" might have originated because of their dwelling in a congregated way (Jamayet) in a particular geographical area. According to the census of 2003, population of the Jamatias is approx around 1 Lac. Jamatia population census is conducted by the Hoda once in every five years.

== Definition ==
The Highest Stratum/Institution of the Jamatia clan of Tripuri community is to be known as "HODA" and it is a traditional social system and hereinafter called the Highest Council in the society. The extent of this system covers only to the Jamatia clan. So, it is called as "JAMATIA HODA". The rules that regulate the Jamatia clan is called "HODA RAIDA". The "Jamatia Hoda" is an organization, which is above the politics and solidly independent and impartial. "Moial" (region) & "Luku" (village) are the lower levels of Institute of the social organization. The ruling of the Hoda is not an object of dishonour. It is constituted to develop the character of the society as well as to make well protected the constitutional rights of India. Therefore, no individual/organisation has the right to criticize or disregard it.

=== Goria Puja ===
(1) The Baba Goria is the universal God of Tripuris. Goria festival is observed for seven days commencing from last day of Chaitra proceeded by "Hari Buisu". The first day of the puja is called "Maha Buisu" and the day of immersion is called "Sena". The articles that are essential during the puja are kept in lock strictly in the house of "Kherphang" as per the rule of the Goria puja.

As a mark of beginning of Goria puja "Chukbar" is made strictly before the Goria puja that is seven days before the puja is due. That day the articles that were kept in lock during one year are brought out and immediately the sound of drum is made by beating as a mark of beginning puja followed by playing of flute. In the Jamatia Community, Goria puja is observed in two places with full enthusiasm-

- (A) Bia Gwnang,
- (B) Bia Kwrwi.

The society/institute regulates the rules of the Goria puja.

(2) A group of Bogla is selected to help the pilgrims in their troubles during the period of seven days.

(3) A Mohanta is selected by the Hoda to monitor and guide the Bogla in accordance with the resolution adopted by the Hoda and as per traditional rites.

(4) Two Goria volunteers from each region are selected in every year for maintaining discipline and peace during the Goria puja.

Baba Garia

== See also ==
- Jamatia
- Tripuri people
- Kokborok
