= Dinesh Debbarma =

Indian Political Leader

Minister for Panchayat and Rural Development
- In office 1978–1988

Member of Legislative Assembly, Tripura
- In office 1977–1993
- Succeeded by: Prasanta Debbarma
- Constituency: Salema

Personal details
- Born: 1918 Salema, Kamalpur
- Died: 28 November 2007 (aged 88–89) GBP Hospital, Agartala
- Party: Communist Party of India (Marxist)

Dinesh Debbarma (1918, Salema – 28 November 2007, Agartala) was a communist politician from the Indian state of Tripura. Debbarma first represented the party while standing in the 1977 Tripura Legislative Assembly elections. He was elected as an MLA three consecutive times from 1977 to 1993. He served as Minister for Panchayat and Rural Development for two terms in 1978 and 1983.

== Career ==
Debbarma was born in a backward tribal village at Maharani in the Kamalpur sub-division. He was a part of the Janasiksha Movement. initiated by Dasarath Deb during royal rule in Tripura. In 1950 he became a member of the Communist Party of India, serving as state council member of the party since its formation in the state. He was one of the founding members of Tripura Rajya Upajati Ganamukti Parishad in 1948. During the 1964 split in the party, he sided with the Communist Party of India (Marxist). He was the state committee member of the CPI (M) until his death. He was minister for Panchayat and Rural Development during the first Left Front government in Tripura, during which the first-ever Panchayat elections under a secret ballot were held in the state. He lived underground for more than six years.

== See also ==
- Dasarath Deb
- Tripura Janasiksha Samiti
- Ganamukti Parishad
