= Jatra (theatre) =

Folk-theatre form of Bengali theatre

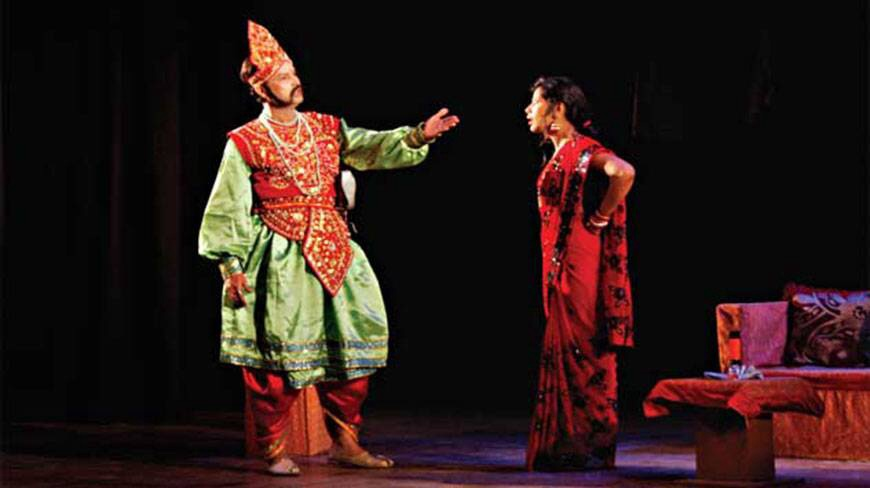
A theatrical Jatra performance

Jatra (Bengali: যাত্রা) is a popular folk-theatre from Bengali theatre and Odia theatre, spread throughout most of Eastern areas of the Indian subcontinent, including Bangladesh and Indian states of West Bengal, Assam, Odisha and Tripura. As of 2005, there were some 55 troupes based in Calcutta's old Jatra district, Chitpur Road and all together, jatra is a $21m-a-year industry, performed on nearly 4,000 stages in West Bengal alone, where in 2001, over 300 companies employed over 20,000 people, more than the local film industry and urban theatre.

The word jatra means journey or going. The origin of jatra, intrinsically a musical theatre form, is traditionally credited to the rise of Sri Chaitanya's Bhakti movement, wherein Chaitanya himself played Rukmini in the performance of Rukmini Haran ("The abduction of the Charming Rukmini") from Krishna's life story, a first definite presentation of this theatrical spectacle. The performance, which lasted through the night in 1507 AD., has been described in Chaitanya Bhagavata, Chaitanya's hagiography by a disciple Vrindavana Dasa Thakura. Though there are evidences of existence of a form of singing called the 'Carya', which was popular between the 9th and the 12th centuries in Bengal, which existed in Odisha simultaneously as the popular 'Chārjya Pada' form. Jatra performances resemble the Nautanki of Uttar Pradesh, the Tamasha of Maharashtra and Bhavai of Gujarat.

Though its birthplace lies in the religious landscape, replete with various Bhakti movements of Hinduism, by the end of the 19th century it was replaced by morally didactic content, and eventually became secular, when it gained entry into urban proscenium theatres during Bengal Renaissance. The survival of the form over such a vast period of rapidly changing social milieu, while catering to a heterogeneous audience, has been credited to its innate malleability and ways of adapting to changing social dynamics, and thus staying not just relevant and alive, but also thriving. In Odisha, content of Jatra is often based on rural social issues and devotional Odia literature. Geetinātya is a type of theatre in Odisha which encourages playfront performance, i.e. singing and acting are combined. Here, singer-cum-actors come for performance.

== Jatra performances ==
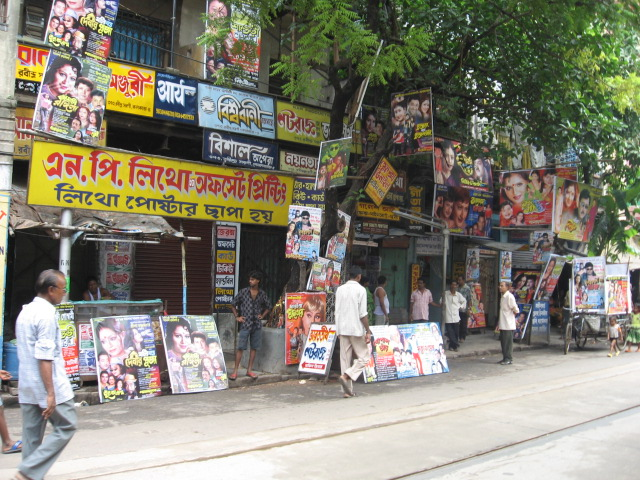
Posters of Jatra in Kolkata, a unique example of local pop art

Jatras are usually epic four-hour-long plays, preceded by a musical concert often lasting an hour, used to attract audiences. The dramatic performance itself is liberally interspersed dramatic monologues, songs and duet dance routines on the folk tunes, which often serve as scene transitions and sometimes mark the end of an act. Jatra plays are usually performed on stages that are open on all sides in open-air arenas. The stage often had minimal or no furniture or props, it was rather seen as a neutral space, free to be given a meaning befitting the scene, this technique continued even when jatra started getting performed in proscenium theatres. Sets, props and lighting came in much later, when its started interacting with Western theatre in the late 19th century, as urban educated youth started joining the jatra tradition.

The cast is predominantly male, whose members also play the female parts, though since the 19th century, female actors started joining the cast. Actors often joined the troupes at a young age, and worked their way up the hierarchy of roles, and strive for virtuoso acting and are judged on their vocal prowess, as this determines their ability to capture a large audience with thundering dialogue deliveries and improvised dialogues. The modern version of jatra, features loud music, harsh lighting and dramatic props played on giant outdoor stages, and actors are hired for a season under written contracts. Sometimes ramps are built around the stage and used for dramatic effects as in Kabuki plays. Jatras are often very melodramatic with highly stylised delivery and exaggerated gestures and orations. Music being the key element of the jatra, much attention is placed on its selection, popular tunes are created and incorporated. Musicians sit on two sides of the stage, carrying Dholak, pakhawaj, harmonium, tabla, flute, cymbals, trumpets, behala (violin) and clarinet, all used to heighten the overall dramatic effect of performances that are already frenzied, plus most of the singing is done by the actors themselves. Many of the songs were based on classical Ragas. A generic character, unique to jatra and part of most jatra performances even today, is the allegorical figure called Bibek or Vivek (Conscience); it performs the function of a moral guardian, commenting on actions of actors and their consequences, sometimes it elaborates on the feelings of different characters, and often steps into a scene unannounced and presents an alternate or philosophical point of view, and all done through singing, something which is done by the chorus in a Greek tragedy. Like Conscience, a character called niyati (Fate) often played by a woman, while commenting on the scene, foretells or warns the actors of impending dangers. Another distinct feature of jatra is that the plays begin with the climax, a device used to captivate the attention of the audience. The jatra season begins in the autumn, around September, around Durga Puja the beginning of harvest season, when the travelling troupe head out to interior rural regions, and ends before the Monsoon sets in, and the beginning of the planting season, around June. Performances of jatras are commonplace after festivities and religious functions, ceremonies in traditional households, and fairs, throughout the region, where these troupes get invited in advance.

== History ==
The recent origins of the jatra can be traced back to rise of Vaishnavism, and the Bhakti movement especially in Krishnaism, in the 16th century, propelled by the advent of mystic Chaitanya Mahaprabhu. The Krishna Jatra, evolved through the devotional singing and dancing of the followers of the Krishna Bhakti movement, inspired by Raslila and dramatic poetry like, Gita Govinda written by Jayadeva in the 12th century and Srikrishna Kirtan by Chandidas in the 15th century. Historians also mention, the existence of Nata Gita, an operatic folk drama for in medieval Bengal, filled with singing, dancing and music sans dialogue, which provided an early model for the Krishna Jatra.

In an era, when there were no theatre houses or fixed stages in Bengal, jatra evolved its idiom in jatras or religious processions (yatra) of devotees that moved from one place to another singing and dancing to the tunes of kirtan or religious songs, often amongst them were artists, adept in singing and dancing, who would often enact scenes from mythology. Later these troupes found place on moving tableaux, which became part of the processions organised on special occasions such Rath Yatra. Gradually these small plays started being performed also at the end of the processions, and on open arenas, known as asar in Bengali, surrounded by people on all sides. In time, these open-air stages became the mainstay of these plays, though the name stuck with the genre; and as it evolved it absorbed all the prevalent folk traditions of music, dance and singing, be it Jhumur, Gambhira, Gajangan, or Panchali into its folds, to create a new template for folk theatre in the coming centuries.

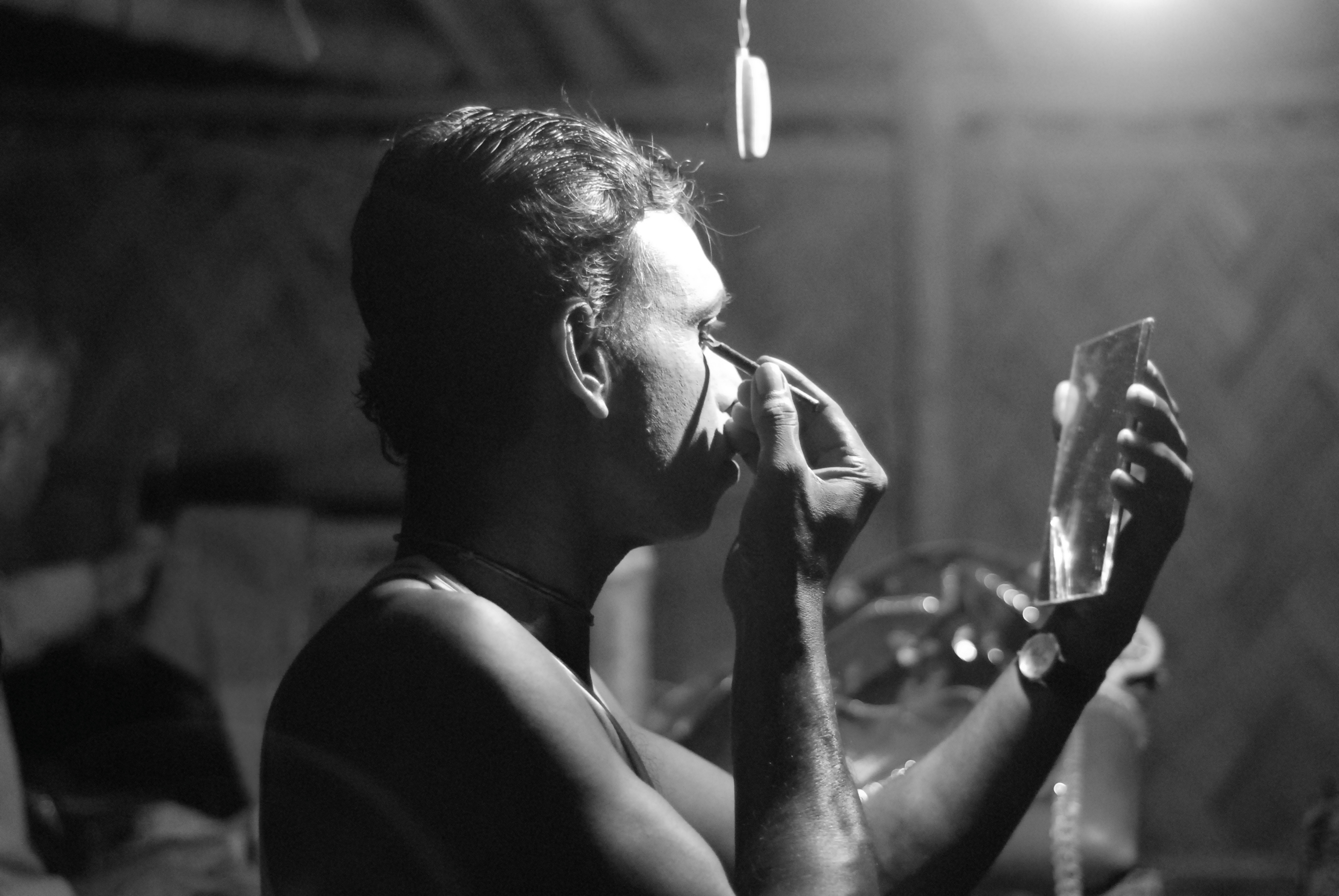
A jatra actor prepares before the performance, Sunderbans.

After Chaitanya, his followers like Ramananda Rai and Rupa Goswami wrote plays based on the life of Sri Krishna, and many received royal patronage as well, like from the King of Puri, Prataprudradeva, which helped this form evolve further. Gradually this evolved into performances of traditional mythological plays with stories of Rama (Ram jatra), Sita, Krishna and Shiva (Shiv jatra), taken from the Ramayan, Mahabharat, Puranas, various historical tales and folklore. Soon the form was adopted by devotees of other Bhakti cults, like Chandi devotees brought in Chandi Mangal, a narrative poem by Mukunda Chakravarti, to start Chandi Jatra, the Behula myth gave rise to Bhasan Jatra, while a Manasa serpent myth took form of the Bisahara Yatra

The jatra movement gradually moved to the urban areas, and even brought literary works to the rural masses which were predominantly illiterate at the time, this meant that the plot, storyline and narrative remained simple, and often didactic. Another development that occurred in the 19th century was its departure from the Krishna Jatra format of musical, as dances were introduce which were to become staple in the coming years, and prose dialogues and free verse speech soon made inroads into this traditional theatre format, giving rise to Natun Jatra, or the New Jatra. Another new trend in jatra during this period was introduction of secular themes, in what was traditionally a religious theatre.

In the early 20th century, at the onset of the Indian independence movement, jatra which had already experienced its artistic and popularity peak in the previous century, now evolved yet again, with the changing tide of Indian milieu. It took on political themes and became a vehicle of political satire and protest, and was called swadesi jatra. It began to reflect the rise current of social and political awareness, and depicted far ranging social themes from Mahatama Gandhi's anti-untouchability movement to the non-violence movement in the coming decades, many of the jatra plays opposing colonialist ideologies, oppression and eulogising patriots were even banned by the British. This was also the time, when Communism was taking roots in Bengal, and jatras increasingly saw dramatisation of the life of Lenin, and portrayal communist ideologies and thought. During World War II, Indian People's Theatre Association (IPTA) used jatra to garner support of Communist Party amongst the Allies, when Germany invaded Russia. Even after the war, noted directors like Utpal Dutt continued to use the jatra element in urban theatre of IPTA, as did Sombhu Mitra with his Bohurupee Company. When the art form travelled to the Tripura region, with its performers, it gave birth to the Kokborok drama, amongst the Kokborok speaking population of the region.

With the rise of Western theatre in Bengal it acquired the themes of political protest and social radicalism, and finally fell into disrepute in the post War era, and especially after the entry of Radio and television and the rise of upmarket theatre industry, though it continued to exist in the rural areas. Jatra remained a living tradition of musical theatre, and some of the popular jatra songs got recorded and became popular Bengali songs, once more ever widening audience base, also scripts of old jatras found their way into books, and newspapers started reserving space for jatra discussion.

This revival seen in the recent decades, started in the early 1960s, with various theatre groups experimenting with the jatra form, and started attracting serious theatre patrons along with official recognition. 1961, saw the first Jatra festival organised in Kolkata and every year since, and in 1968, Phanibhusan Bidyabinod became the first jatra artist to receive the Sangeet Natak Akademi Award. Earlier most jatra companies were owned by actor-managers or singers, today most are owned by businesses and are more prone to commercialisation, both in the content as well as in presentation. Even today, in majority the presentation style still is inspired by cinemas of the regions and television soaps, many a times reflected in the risque content. Yet, within its musical theatre genre jatra remains highly adaptable and rapidly evolving form. Several jatras today pick contemporary news events like the London bombings, 9/11 or the war in Iraq, and highlight local issues as well. Further as productions are often put up within a month, a clear advantage over theatre and film, jatras remain topical by drawing upon current imagery of the populace, like when Phoolan Devi became notorious the 80s, a play staged by the same name gained immense popularity not to mention big revenue.
