= Tripura State Tribal Museum =

Museum in Agartala, India

- Established: September 23, 2009
- Location: Tribal Research and Cultural Institute, Agartala, IND
- Type: Tribal museum
- Collections: Tripuri
- Website: trci.tripura.gov.in/emuseum/

Tripura State Tribal Museum is a museum located within the premises of the Tribal Research and Cultural Institute at Agartala, India. The museum was conceived with the intention of promoting tribal heritage and culture.

== Collections ==
The exhibits of the Museum are displayed under different sections, viz., Video Wall, Tribal Life Dioramas, Miscellaneous, Auditorium, Touch screen Kiosks, Natural History, art and Crafts, Anthropology & Folk Art & Arms section. The sculptures from the Tripura region fall into four principal categories - stone, wood, metal and terracotta. The collections which are on display here, are very rare.

The library in Tripura was established in 2009 and is rich in its historical collections. There are various periodicals, journals and books relating to art, culture, mythology, biography, encyclopedic works and even the Asiatic Society journals of the country.

== Notable artefacts ==
| Original name | English name | Tribe | Region | Notes |
|---|---|---|---|---|
| CHAKHI | Ginning Machine | All tribes of Tripura | Tripura | This implement is used for removing or crushing the seeds from cotton. |
| IPTECHEI / SHOLA | Bag | Mizo and Tripuri | North Tripura | Cloth bag carried by Mizo. |
| RIKARI / RIKOHTHEG | Weave sample | Tripuri | Tripura | Sample of weaves that form part of tribal identity on clothing. |
| REEGYOWEING | Traditional Musical Instrument | Mog | West Tripura | This instrument is similar to the jal tarang. |
| DULA / FURA | Basket | Tripuri | Tripura | This basket is used for the washing of rice. |
| SICHING | Fish Trap | Tripuri | Tripura | Fish trap designed to catch river fish. |
| DU | Fish Trap | Reang | Tripura | Fish trap designed to catch river fish. |
| KHAM | Drum | Tripuri | Tripura | This drum is constructed by stretching two leather membranes. |
| SUDAM / ENCHI / LUI | Fish Sweep | Major tribes of Tripura | Tripura | Used as a sweep for catching fish. |
| ROMOI / NATAI / CHOKHA / NADEI | Spinning Wheel | Major tribes of Tripura | Tripura | All tribes weave their own garments from cotton thread, after spinning and dying the thread themselves. |
| EEJONI | Fish Sweep | Chakma | Tripura | Used as a sweep for catching fish. |
| AHDA | Basket | Chakma | Tripura | Used as a fish container. |
| KHANGRAI DULA | Basket | Tripuri | Tripura | Used as a fish container. |
| TINTRONG | Traditional Musical Instrument | Tripuri | West Tripura | This musical instrument is specially prepared during the Lebang Bumani dance. |
| BADUKHUNG AND CHAKLAH | Bow and Arrow | All tribes of Tripura | Tripura | This weapon is made as a shooting birds or enemies. |
| CHONG PRENG | Fiddle | Tripuri and Reang | Tripura | String instrument similar to a rudimentary violin. |
| BALA MATHIA | Bangle | Tripuri | Tripura | Hollow silver bangle with floral motif. |
| BALA | Bangle | Tripuri | Tripura | Hollow silver bangle with raised circular design. |
| KHARUK | Anklet | Tripuri | Tripura | Hollow silver anklet with bud shaped ends. |
| BERBERANG YAKSO | Armband | Reang | Tripura | Spiral length of flattened silver, used as a bangle. |
| SURANG / SANGENG / SANGAI | Hairpin | Tripuri, Jamatia and Reang | Tripura | Hairpin with floral head and long chain. |
| RANGBWTANG / RANG TANG / TENGASORA | Necklace | Tripuri and Chakma | Tripura | Necklace made up of silver hexagonal beads, red beads and 25 coins. |
| dual kafer | seed storage | Bru/Reang | Gomati/ North Tripura | Made from bamboo for storing seed to prevent from Rat/Mice |

== Events: Tribal Festivals and Celebrations ==
- State Level Tribal Festival
- Folk dance competition
- Kok-Borok day

== Visiting Hours ==
The museum remains open 06 days from 10:00am – 5:00pm during summers and from 10:00am – 4:30pm during winters except on Mondays: 2nd and 4th Saturday and Government Holidays. Currently due to COVID-19 pandemic the museum is temporarily closed for public.

== See also ==
- Tripura State Museum
- Tribal Research and Cultural Institute
- Lists of museums in India
- Tripura State Academy of Tribal Culture
