= Bijoy Debbarma =

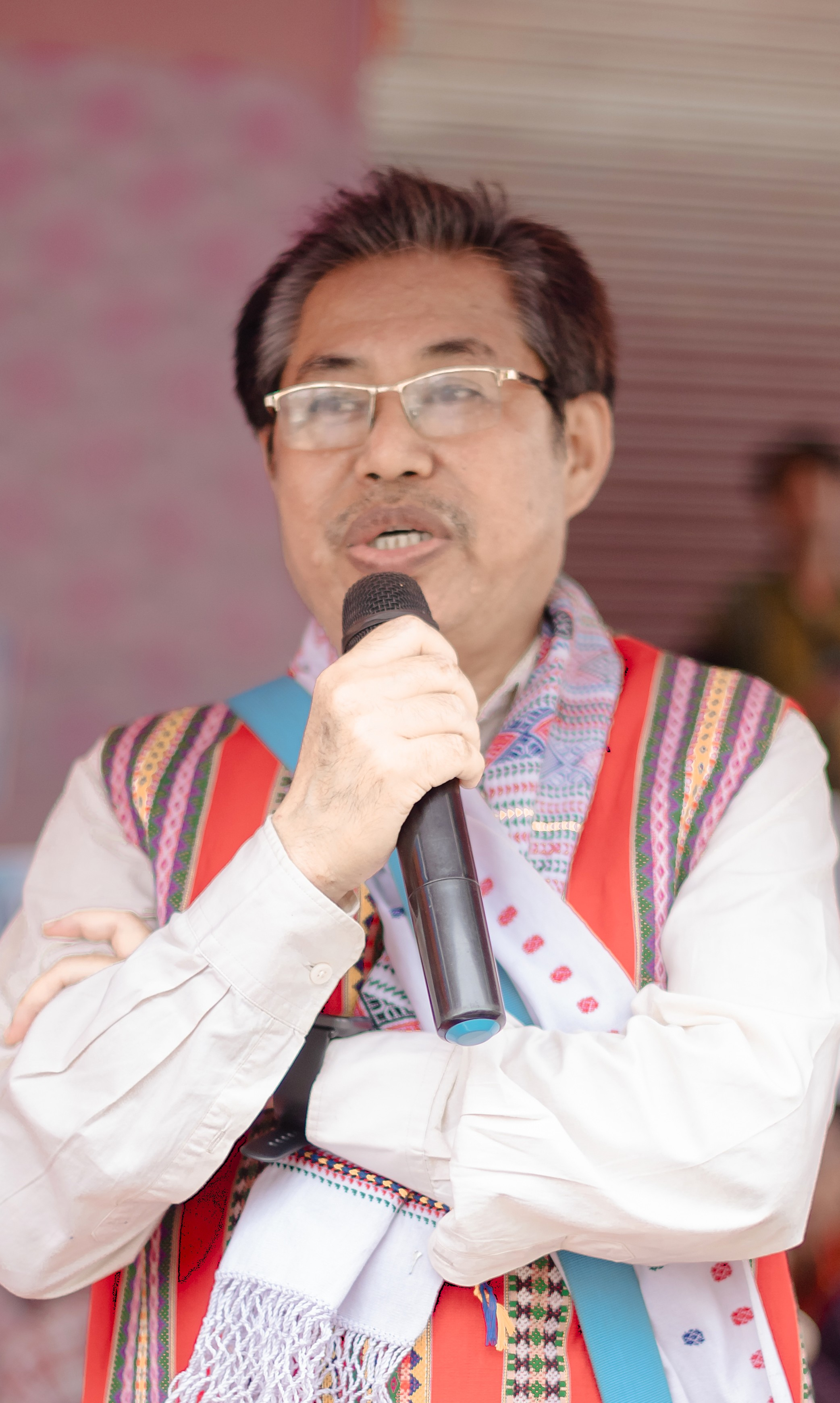
- Debbarma in 2023
- Born: 12 January 1962 (age 64); Bijoypur, Cachar, Assam
- Education: North Eastern Regional Medical College (MBBS); AIIMS, Delhi (MD)
- Occupations: Physician; Novelist; Poet
- Writing career
- Notable works: Longtoraini Ekolobya (1998); Dolai Twima Naro (2008)
- Notable awards: Radhamohan Thakur Memorial Award; Shyamlal Debbarma Mukumu Award; Bhismadev Bhattacharjee Literary Award

Bijoy Debbarma (born 12 January 1962) is an Indian poet, novelist, and activist from the Northeastern state of Tripura. He writes in Kokborok language and is known for his poetry collection including Longtraini Ekolobya (1998) and the novel Dolai Twima Naro (2008). His works are now included and taught in the Kokborok literature curriculum of central universities and colleges.

== Early life and education ==
Bijoy Debbarma was born on 12 January 1962 to a Tiprasa father Dharmarai Debbarma and a Dimasa mother Pritirani Barman in Bijoypur situated at the bank of Jathinga River, Cachar District of Assam. His father Dharmarai was a political activist while his mother Pritirani who had a connection to the royal family of Dimasa Kingdom was a poet. After his birth, the family resided in Tripura and was brought up at Maharani Village, Kamalpur under Dhalai District.

Debbarma pursued MBBS from the Regional Institute of Medical Sciences, Imphal and later acquired MD from AIIMS, Delhi in ophthalmology. Debbarma is also an ophthalmologist and worked as a medical officer in the Health Department of Tripura Government. He was also the former president of the Tripura State Medical Council (TSMC). His elder brother is the Kokborok composer, poet, activist and writer Bikashrai Debbarma.

== Literary activities ==
Bijoy Debbarma is currently the president of the Kokborok literary organisation Kokborok Tei Hukumu Mission (KOHM). The organisation focuses on promotkng the development and preservation of Kokborok literature, Tiprasa culture, tradition, and its heritage.

== Writings ==
=== Poetry ===
- Longtoraini Ekolobya (1998)

=== Novel ===
- Dolai Twima (2008)
- Yamroksa ni Kothoma (2022)

=== Short stories ===
- Swkal Jwkma (1998)
- Nokhaisa Kerang Kothoma (2011)
- Huk Tei Kamchwlwi Bura
