= Tripuri Kshatriya =

Tripuri Kshatriya is a Vaishnav caste group which encompasses almost all the members of the Tripuri, Reang, Jamatia and Noatia ethnic groups, most of whom live in the Indian state of Tripura. The Tripuri Royal Family belonged to the manikya or royal clan, from the Indigenous clan. Originally the term "Tripur Kshatriya" was used to denote the royal court members only, but in due time, the Maharajah included the remaining four ethnic groups as well, in an attempt to foster a sense of kinship among his people. With the influx of the Bengali immigrants from neighboring places, the Tripuris lost their majority in their own kingdom and the Maharajah's power was taken away by the Indian government. Formerly, the community was organized under the Tripura Kshatriya Samaj, which was headed by the Maharajah of Tripura himself.

== Local organization ==
The Maharajah appointed governors, known as Rai to help him in administration. These governors oversaw the governing of various districts. The governorates were again subdivided into chiefdoms, which were administrated by a Chowdhury. The families who were considered close to the Royal Family were granted the title Thakur by the Maharajah, which was considered to be one of the highest ranks of nobility in Tripura.

== Religious intolerance ==
Maharajah Bir Bikram Kishore Debbarma Manikya Bahadur, who ruled Tripura from 1923 to 1947 was widely criticized for his religious intolerance.

In 1942, the Rai of the Riang area, Debi Singh Riang was dismissed by the Maharajah and Khagendra Riang Chowdhury of Bangafa was appointed as the new Rai. He increased the tax on Ganga Puja by 100%. This caused widespread discontent among the Riangs and lead to the outbreak of a small-scale rebellion under the leadership of Ratanmani Noatia, a Vaishnava sadhu. The rebels formed a parallel government, looted the granaries and houses of wealthy Chowdhuries. However, towards the end of 1943, the Maharajah of Tripura with the help of his loyal soldiers drawn from the Tripuri and Jamatia was able to rout the rebels and arrest the instigators. The Mahajarah's forces arrested more than 300 civilians, including around 200 women and children. Ratanmani Sadhu was taken to the Maharajah's palace, where he was brutally tortured before the execution.

In 1946, the Maharajah decided to evict close to 500 Muslim families from the outskirts of Agartala. Despite huge outcry from other parts of India and intervention by the leaders of the Indian National Congress, the eviction was carried out.

== Decline of power ==
Maharajah Bir Bikram Kishore Manikya suddenly died on 17 May 1947. After his death, Regent Queen Kanchan Prava Debi took up the administration and decided to merge the Kingdom with India, despite the advice from most of her ministers like Durjoy Kishore Debbarma for a merger with Pakistan. Maharajah Kirit Bikram Kishore Manikya Bahadur assumed power in 1947 and ruled until 1949 when the kingdom merged with India.

== See also ==
- Kshatriya
- Tripura
- Tripuri people
