= Kokborok grammar =

Grammar of the Kokborok language

Kokborok grammar is the grammar of the Kokborok language, also known as Tripuri or Tipra which is spoken by the Tripuri people, the native inhabitants of the state of Tripura. It is the official language of Tripura, a state located in Northeast India.

== Syntax ==
The principal structures of affirmative sentences in Kokborok are the following:

Subject Complement
Naisok {chwrai kaham.}
Naisok {boy good}
Naisok is a good boy.

Subject Object Verb
Naisok mai chao.
Naisok rice eat
Naisok eats rice.

Possessive Subject Question
Nini (bu)mung tamo?
Your name what
What is your name?

Subject Question Verb
Nwng {tamoni bagwi} phai?
You {what for} come
Why have you come?

Subject {Verb and Question}
Nwng thangnaide?
You {will go}
Will you go?

Subject {Verb and Command}
Nwng thangdi.
You go
You go.

== Person ==
In Kokborok grammar use of the notion of 'person' is almost absent; the form of verb is same for one who speaks, one who is spoken to, and one who is spoken about.

== Number ==
In Kokborok there are two numbers: Singular and plural. The plural marker is used at the end of the noun or pronoun. There are two plural markers: rok and song. Rok is universally used while song is used with human nouns only. The plural marker is normally used at the end of the noun or pronoun. But when the noun has an adjective the plural marker is used at the end of the adjective instead of the noun.

Examples:

- Bwrwirok Teliamura o thangnai. These women will go to Teliamura.
- O bwrwi naithokrok kaham rwchabo. These beautiful women sing very well.

== Gender ==
In Kokborok there are four genders: masculine gender, feminine gender, common gender, and neuter gender. Words which denote male are masculine, words which denote female are feminine, words which can be both male and female are common gender, and words which cannot be either masculine or feminine are neuter gender.

Gender examples
chwla	man – masculine
bwrwi	woman – feminine
chwrai	child – common
buphang	tree – neuter

There are various ways to change genders of words:

Using different words
bwsai	husband	bihik	wife
phayung	brother	hanok	sister
kiching	male friend	mare	female friend

Adding i at the end of the masculine word
sikla	young man	sikli	young woman
achu	grandfather	achui	grandmother
When the masculine words ends in a, the a is dropped.

Adding jwk at the end of the masculine word
bwsa	son	bwsajwk	daughter
kwra	father-in-law	kwrajwk	mother-in-law

Words of common gender are made masculine by adding suffixes, like sa, chwla/la, jua and feminine by adding ma, jwk, bwrwi
pun	goat	punjua	he goat	punjwk	she goat
tok	fowl	tokla	cock	tokma	hen
takhum	swan	takhumchwla	drake	takhumbwrwi	duck

== Case and case endings ==
In Kokborok there are the nominative, accusative, instrumental, ablative, locative and possessive cases.

Case suffixes
Nominative	o
Accusative	no
Instrumental	bai
Ablative	ni
Locative	o
Possessive	ni

These case suffixes are used at the end of the noun/pronoun and there is no change in the form of the noun.

== Adjective ==
In Kokborok the adjectives come after the words they qualify. This rule is strictly followed only in the case of native adjectives. In case of loan adjectives the rule is rather loose. Kokborok adjectives may be divided into four classes:

1. pure adjectives
2. compound adjectives
3. verbal adjectives
4. K-adjectives

The first three classes may include both native and loan words. The fourth class is made of purely native words. e.g.:

1. hilik – heavy, heleng – light
2. bwkha kotor – (heart big) – brave, bwkha kusu – (heart small) – timid
3. leng – tire, lengjak – tired, ruk – to boil, rukjak – boiled.
4. kaham – good, kotor – big, kisi – wet.

== Numerals ==
Kokborok numerals are both decimal and vigesimal.

1. sa
2. nwi
3. tham
4. brwi
5. ba
6. dok
7. sni
8. char
9. chuku
10. chi
- ra – hundredth
- sara – one hundred
- sai – thousandth
- sasai- one thousand
- rwjag – a lakh

A numeral is organised as:

chi + sa
ten + one
11

== See also ==
- Meitei grammar
- Tripuri language
- Chinese language
- Burmese language
- Languages of India
- Kokborok History
