= Naresh Chandra Dev Varma =

Indian writer

- Born: 31 October 1944 (age 81); Tripura (princely state), British India
- Occupation: Writer
- Parent(s): Madan Mohan Dev Varma(Father); Sambhu Laxmi Dev Varma(Mother)
- Writing career
- Language: Kokborok
- Notable awards: Padma Shri(2026)

Naresh Chandra Dev Varma a Tripuri Indian folk writer and litterateur, known for his contribution to the fields of literature and education in Tripura. In recognition of his work, he was awarded the "Tripura Bhushan", the state's highest civilian award, in 2024 and the Padma Shri, India’s fourth-highest civilian award, in 2026 for his contribution to literature and education. He has authored 34 books primarily in Kokborok.

== Awards ==
- Padma Shri 2026
