= Tribal Research and Cultural Institute =

Public institute in Agartala, India

- Type: Public research institute
- Established: 1970
- Academic affiliations: Tripura State Academy of Tribal Culture
- Officer in charge: Ar. Naba Kumar Deb Barma, THAS Gr-IV
- Chair: Bikash Debbarma
- Director: Ananda Hari Jamatia, TCS SSG
- Location: Agartala
- Website: trci.tripura.gov.in

Tribal Research and Cultural Institute was established under Tribal Welfare Department in the year 1970 as per the decision of the Government of India. It is dedicated to conduct research on tribal issues and also evaluate the various programmes'/schemes' impact on the tribes residing in Tripura.

== Major activities ==
- Research Studies
- Tribal Language Development
- Publication
- Documentation works
- Seminar/ Workshop/Training
- Ethno-Cultural Museum
- Library
- Auditorium
- Tripura State Academy of Tribal Culture
- Associate Programme with Outside Institutes/Agencies
- Promotion of Tribal Culture

== Wings ==
- Research Wing
- Publication Wing
- Audio-Visual and Multi-Media Wing
- Tribal Language Wing
- Library
- Museum
- Auditorium
- Tripura State Academy of Tribal Culture

== Tribes covered ==
- Bhil
- Bhutia
- Chaimal
- Chakma
- Garo
- Halam
- Jamatia
- Khashia
- Kuki
- Lepcha
- Lushai
- Mog
- Munda
- Noatia
- Orang
- Reang
- Santal
- Tripuri
- Uchai

== Functions ==
The primary function of this institute is to conduct research on tribal issues as also to study and gauge the various schemes' impact on Tribal life in the state. It further offers in-serve training courses and also coaching to the tribal aspirants vying for jobs through degree and diploma courses among others. It also runs Youth Leadership Training Programmes aimed at tribal groups.

== Facilities ==
Tripura State Tribal Museum is located in the building of this institute. The institute also has a library with books related to tribals. It publishes two research journals biannually, a literary journal 'SAIMA' and a journal on Tribal Life and culture 'TUI'.

== Library ==
- Impact of Block (Rubber) plantation in Tripura
- Cinema as Art & Popular Culture in Tripura: An Introduction
- Sri Rajmala Vol. I to IV

== See also ==
- Tripura State Tribal Museum
