= Sefali Debbarma =

Indian poet and novelist

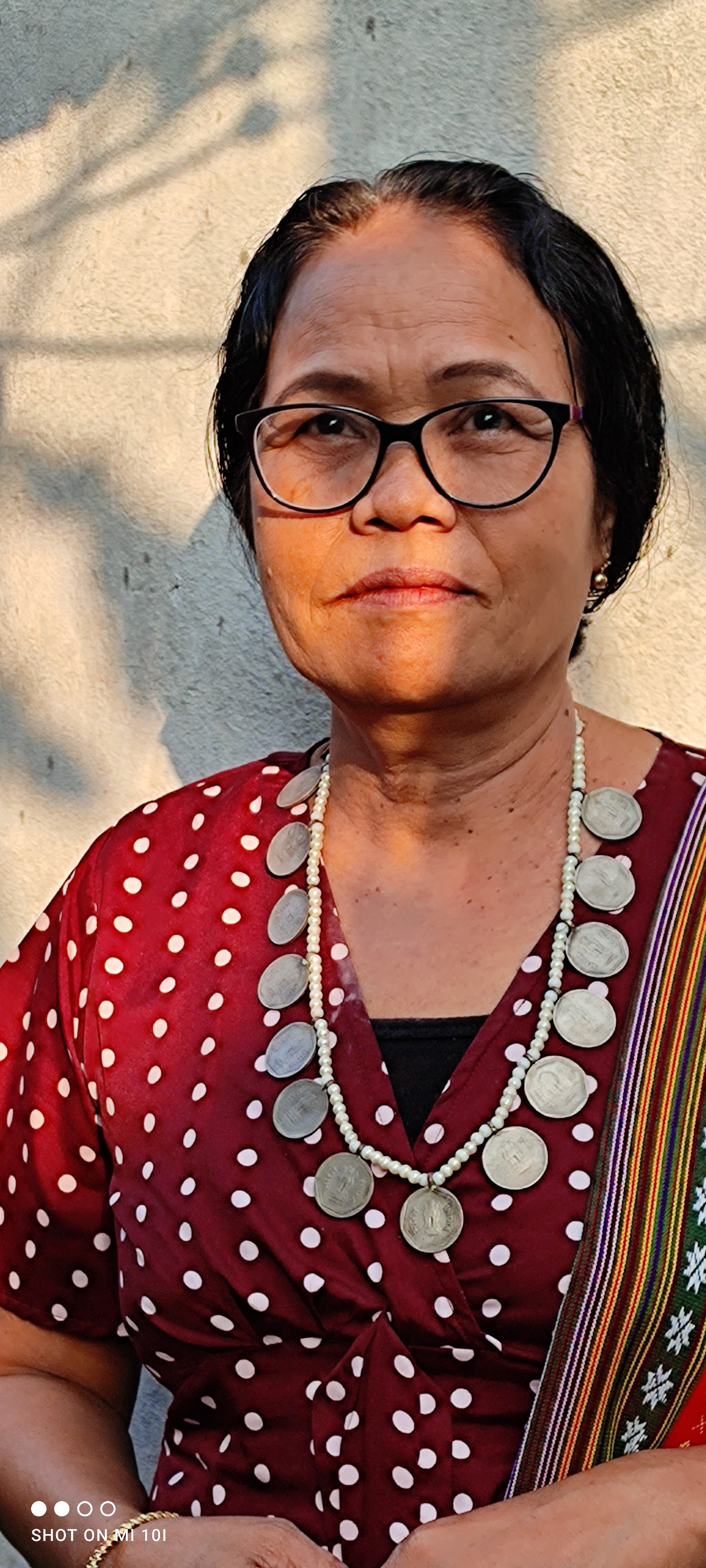
- Sefali Debbarma in 2022
- Born: 3 February 1964; Pattabil Kami, Tripura
- Occupation: Poet
- Writing career
- Language: Kokborok
- Notable work: Lamination
- Notable awards: Tripura State Award for Poetry (2004), Ranchak Richak Award (2022)

Sefali Debbarma is an Indian poet and novelist from Tripura. Her poem "Lamination" was included in the collection 100 Great Indian Poems.

== Career ==
Debbarma's works mostly reflect on the reality of the Tripuri (Tiprasa) people's lifestyle, spanning from the contemporary times of the 20th century to the present political reality of Tripura.

Her writings were translated and published in the anthology The Fragrant Jhum: a Translation of Kokborok Poetry in English by Ashes Gupta.

Her latest 2024 release, a poem collection is 'Yakung Yak Barsajak'.

=== Poetry ===
- Lamination
- Hor Diporo Rwchapmung
- Imangni Yakharai Ninango
- Tal Kwchang Yorkhlai Thango
- Kothoma Sichai Tongo
- Yakung Yak Barsajak (2024)
