= Jamatia =

Tripuri clan of Tripura, India

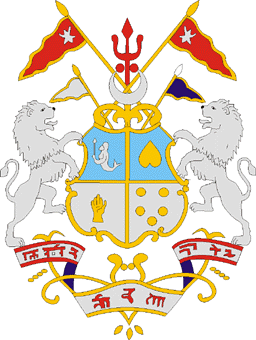

Profile
- Country: India
- Region: Tripura
- Ethnicity: Tripuri

Chief
- (Triluchan)
- Hoda Okara's

The Jamatias are one of the main Tripuri clans of Tripura and the only such clan with its own customary law in practice (Jamatia Customary Laws Act, 2017), which is called Jamatia Raida.

== See also ==
- Tripuri people
- Kokborok
- Jamatia Hoda
- List of Scheduled Tribes in India
- Tripuri Kshatriya
