= Umakanta Academy =

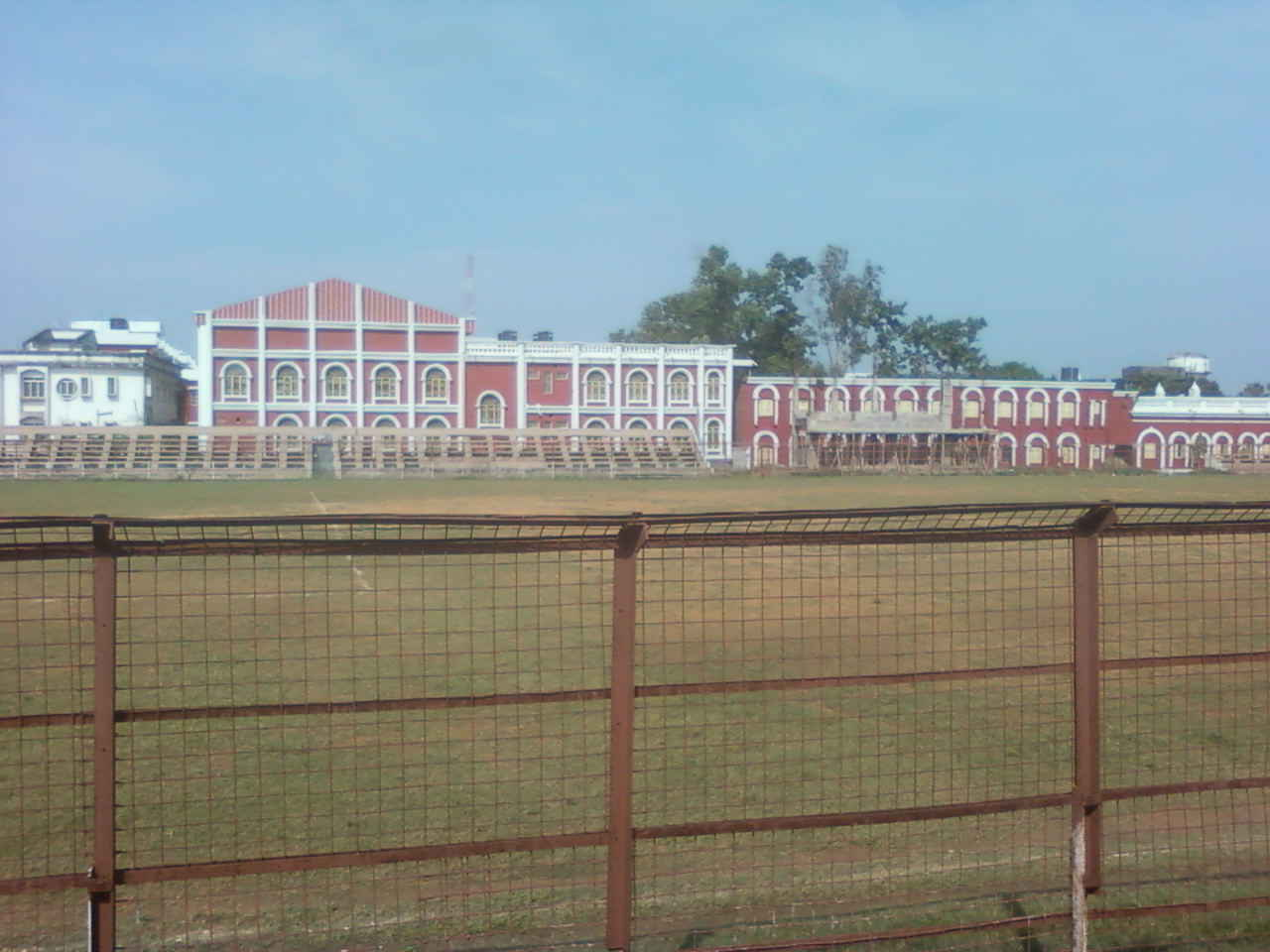
- Umakanta Academy

Location
- Akhaura Road; Agartala, Tripura; India
- Coordinates: 23.831544°N 91.274212°E

Information
- Type: Public
- Established: 1890 (136 years ago)
- Founder: Maharaja Bir Chandra Manikya
- Grades: Class I-XII
- Campus type: Urban
- Affiliation: Central Board of Secondary Education

Umakanta Academy is an educational institute located in Agartala, India. Established in 1890, it is the oldest school in Tripura. It is affiliated with CBSE.

== History ==
The Agartala Higher Education School was founded by Maharaja Bir Chandra Manikya in 1890 and developed by Maharaja Radha Kishore Manikya when he acceded to the throne in 1896. It was renamed as Umakanta Academy in 1904 in honour of the Chief Minister of Tripura, Umakanta Das. It has two playgrounds, one swimming pool, a hostel and a football stadium with floodlights and galleries.

== Notable alumni ==
- Sudhanwa Debbarma (1918 – 1999), Kokborok writer, political leader, and member of the Communist Party of India (Marxist), Speaker of Tripura Legislative Assembly, leader of Ganamukti Parishad, and a member of Tripura Legislative Assembly (1977-1988).
