= Bikashrai Debbarma =

Indian poet, author and composer

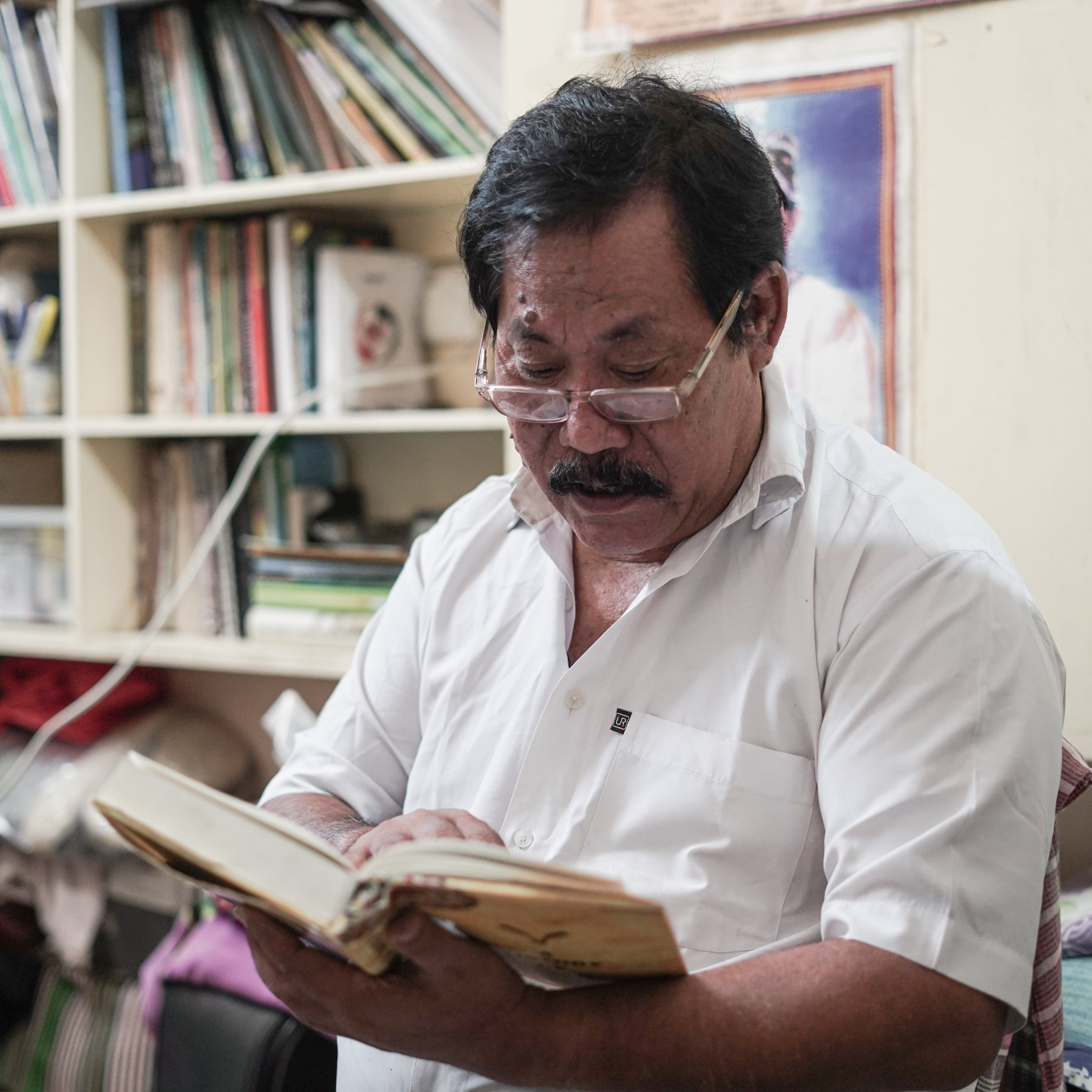
- Debbarma in 2023
- Born: 22 May 1960 (age 66)
- Occupations: Poet; composer
- Writing career
- Notable works: Tutankhamun ni Pyramid (2022); Chirik Morok (2022)
- Notable awards: Doulat Ahmed Award

Bikashrai Debbarma (born 22 May 1960) is an Indian poet, author and composer from the state of Tripura. The majority of his writings in Kokborok are based in the lived realities of the people in Tripura in north-east India. His 2021 poetry 'Tutankhamun ni Pyramid' won the Doulat Ahmed Award for best publication in the year 2022.

Debbarma and playwright Nanda Kumar Debbarma recently compiled 'Chirik Morok', an anthology of Kokborok poetry. He is also the president Kokborok Sahitya Sabha (KBSS) and of the confederation RSKC (Roman Script for Kokborok Choba). In 2023, he was nominated as member of the General Council (2023–2027) of the Sahitya Akademi.

== Works ==
Known mostly for his poetry, Bikashrai Debbarma is considered among the widely known 'Kokborok Modernist'.

== Language advocacy ==
As president of the Roman Script for Kokborok Choba (RSKC), Debbarma has been active in advocating for the upliftment of Kokborok language. RSKC led by veteran Kokborok literary activists have demanded Roman Script to included as official script for Kokborok.

== Impact and legacy ==
Debbarma was a major influence and inspiration to the Kokborok Indie-folk band Koloma and its singer Rumio Debbarma's songwriting. In an interview with Roots and Leisure, the frontman Rumio said: "Seeing how our traditional folk culture is dying among the current and younger generations, I wanted to preserve it by writing songs that blend our traditional style with modern genres. We started making our own blend of folk fusion music to grasp their interest. I have also always been very inspired by the local legend Bikash Rai Debbarma."

== Selected published works ==
- Chirik Morok (2022)
- Tutankhamun ni Pyramid (2022)
- Text Message

== Awards ==
- Doulat Ahmed Prize, 2022
