= Tripura Janasiksha Samiti =

Indian education organisation

- Formation: 27 December 1945; 80 years ago
- Founders: Dasarath Deb, Sudhanwa Debbarma, Hemanta Debbarma, Aghore Debbarma, Biren Dutta, Nilmani Debbarma
- Founded at: Durga Choudhury Para, Jirania
- Purpose: Support Education and to spread Education among the tribals so that people can be educated and gathers knowledge. Besides, to ensure that no children should left uneducated and face hurdles in the future.
- Origins: Tripura (princely state)

The Tripura Janasiksha Samiti was an organisation in the Indian state of Tripura (princely state) which was created to set up schools and spread education among the children of the down-trodden people of that state. It was formed on 27 December 1945.

At that time, the movement of the Janasiksha Samiti speedily transformed into a mass movement. The Samiti could establish 488 primary schools in different remote areas of the state with the active co-operation, financial help and labour of the mass people. Subsequently, in 1950–51, most of these schools were recognised by the State Government. The Samiti also published the first Kokborok Magazine "Kwtal Kothoma" in 1954 AD under Sudhanwa Debbarma.
