= Twipra Students' Federation =

Students' association in Tripura, India

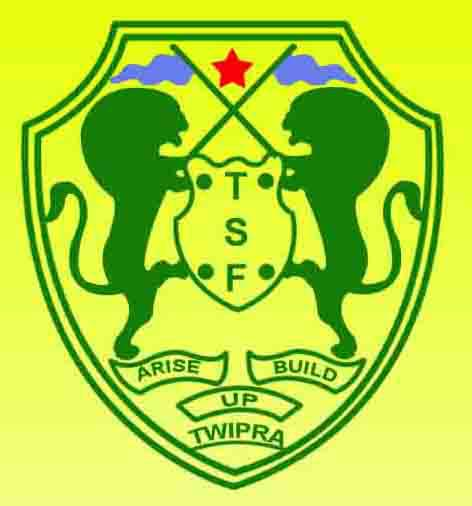
- Flag of the Twipra Students Federation
- Abbreviation: TSF
- Formation: 25 October 1968 (58 years ago)
- Type: Nationalist student organisation
- Legal status: Active
- Headquarters: Khumulwng, Tripura
- Location: Tripura, India
- Founding President: (Lt) Shri. Sukumoy Debbarma Founding General Secretary Lt. Bg. Nagendra Jamatia
- General Secretary: Bg.Hamalu Jamatia
- President: Bg Pintu Debbarma

Twipra Students' Federation (TSF) was founded on 25 October 1968 as a platform for nationalist students' federation of Tripura, specially among the indigenous people of the Indian state of Tripura. It is a totally independent indigenous students' organisation. One of its primary objectives was to protect and fight for the rights for the indigenous people of the state. Since its inception, TSF has made significant contributions towards bringing justice to indigenous Students, Youth and people of Tripura. But perhaps, one of the most important aspects of the Federation has been ‘to speak truth to power’. Over the years the Federation has raised its voice against dam construction and alienation of indigenous peoples land and lifting up of APFSA(Armed Forces Special Powers Acts) from the state.

In state like Tripura where the indigenous people have been reduced to politically insignificant minority and push to the margin. Majority has become the minority in its own land. The indigenous people of Tripura are a victim of identity crisis in their own state. The majority has become the minority in its own land. It is from that margin it has challenged and struggled against anti-indigenous people policies of the state. In 1996 the Federation rechristened as " Twipra Students' Federation" in order to encapsulate its nationalistic attributes and around the World.

== History ==
TSF was formed as the Tribal Students Federation in 1968. During the years of its existence, TSF has been the main ethno-nationalist students organization amongst the tribal students of the state. TSF played an important role in the formation of Tripura Upajati Juba Samiti.

== Foundation day ==
The Foundation day is celebrated on 25 October every year with Annual conferences, remembering the Motto: Arise! Build UP (Twipra).

== Martyr day ==
Martyr day is observed on 13 June.

== History ==
Originally one of the main reasons behind their formation was to initiate a revival of cultural pride among the indigenous population for their traditions, customs & language , which were quickly dwindling away as many of the members of the indigenous community had started adopting the norms & customs of the Bengali community & some of the members of the indigenous community had also started adopting the Bengali as their mother tongue, as fluency in Bengali came to be seen as indication of high status in Tripuri Society in the early 1960's. At the same time Kokborok & the traditional customs were being relinquished by the some members of the Indigenous tribal community. The very well educated elites among the Indigenous community came to see, the dangers posed by this phenomenon & realized that there was a real possibility of their cultural identity going completely extinct. Another important incident that motivated the creation of TSF, was the ridicule that Indigenous tribal students were subjected to by their non-tribal peers for wearing their traditional attire & girl students from the indigenous community were all subjected to compulsory wearing of saree in schools. These acted as catalysts & eventually Tribal Students Federation was founded by Late. Sukhomoy Debbarma along with Nagendra Jamatia on 25 October 1968 to tackle these previous mentioned major issues along with other minor issues.

== Flag symbolism ==
A flag with a red five cornered star in the top Middle its a symbol of Leading Morning Star called Aitorma in Kokborok, on a white background meaning Peace and Prosperity, Two lions holding a flag each and a dhal meaning protection and Victory of the federation; the ratio of length and breadth of the flag being 3:3.
