= Sukhendu Debbarma =

Indian historian

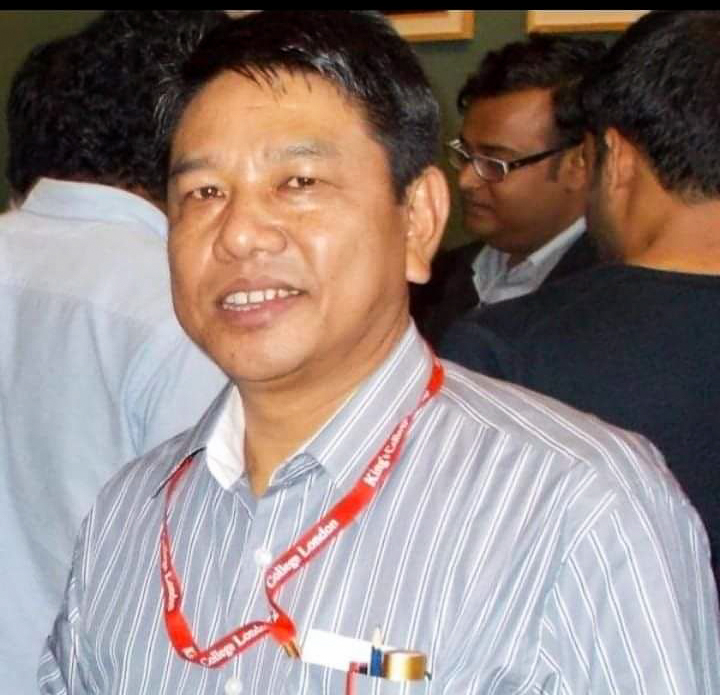
- Born: 26 January 1969 (age 57); Bishramganj, Sepahijala, Tripura
- Education: St. Anthony's College (BA); Northeastern Hill University (PhD)
- Title: Dean of the Faculty of Social Sciences, Tripura University
- Occupations: Historian, academic, author, human rights activist
- Known for: Origin and Growth of Christianity in Tripura (1996)

Academic work
- Main interests: History of Modern India with focus on North East India, Indigenous Peoples Issues, Tripura Movements

Sukhendu Debbarma (born 26 January 1969) is a Tripuri-Indian historian, academic, author, human rights activist and professor in the Department of History at the Tripura University and the dean of the Faculty of Social Sciences and Faculty of Music and Fine Arts.

== Published works ==
Books

- Origin and Growth of Christianity in Tripura (1996)

Articles

- Genesis of Youth Unrest in Tripura: A Case Study in Youth at the Crossroads: A Study of North East India, Shiela Bora & S.D.Goswami (ed), Guwahati, 2007, pp. 186–200.
- Peace Accords in Tripura- Background and Analysis in Peace in India's North –East, Biswas Prasenjit & C.Joshua Thomas (ed), Regency Publication, New Delhi, 2006, pp. 405–424.
- Shifting Cultivation A Case Study among the Borok People of Tripura, in the Proceedings of the North East India History Association, XIX Session, Kohima 1998, Shillong, 1999, pp. 199–205.
