= Sudhanwa Debbarma =

Indian politician (1918–1999)

- Born: 26 February 1918; Sutarmura, Bishalgarh, Tripura (princely state)
- Died: 1999 (aged 80–81)
- Citizenship: India
- Education: Umakanta Academy (Class-12); Shreekail College Bangladesh (B.A)
- Occupations: Writer, Politician
- Organization: Ganamukti Parishad
- Known for: Father of Kokborok language & literature
- Political party: Communist Party of India (Marxist)
- Parents: Budhikumar Debbarma (father); Indrabati Devi (mother)

Sudhanwa Debbarma

Member of Legislative Assembly, Tripura
- In office 1977–1988
- Preceded by: Gunapada Jamatia
- Succeeded by: Tarani Debbarma
- Constituency: Takarjala (Vidhan Sabha constituency)

Speaker of Tripura Legislative Assembly
- In office 24 January 1978 – 6 January 1983

Sudhanwa Debbarma (also spelt Sudhanya Debbarma) (26 February 1918 – 1999) was an Indian Kokborok writer, Political leader and member of the Communist Party of India (Marxist). He was a former Speaker of the Tripura Legislative Assembly. He was a veteran leader of the Ganamukti Parishad. He was a member of Tripura Legislative Assembly from Takarjala (Vidhan Sabha constituency) between 1977 and 1988.

== Early life ==
Debbarma was born in a lower-middle-class family in Sutarmura village under Bishalgarh Sub-division, West Tripura district (present day Sepahijala district) in Tripura. He spent his primary school days in his village, after which he moved to Agartala for higher education. He completed his higher secondary education at Umakanta Academy. After higher secondary he went to Bangladesh for graduate studies.

== Political career ==
Debbarma and other activists started revolution against the king of Tripura to spread education among the Tiprasa population. They established Tripura Janasiksha Samiti in 1945, with Debbarma as the founding president of the organization. The king issued an arrest warrant against the Janashiksha Samiti eaders and he was arrested and severely beaten up while in jail. This led to Janashiksha Samiti Sudhanwa and other leaders demanding the right to life and livelihood of the Tripuri people. On 15 August 1948, Sudhanwa, Dasarath Deb, Hemanta Debbarma, Bidya Debbarma and other leaders formed the Ganamukti Parishad, in opposition to the torture of bureaucrats and police of Tripura. He was inspired by communist ideology and became a member of the Communist Party of India. When the Communist Party was split in 1964, he took the side of the Communist Party of India (Marxist) and was elected to the Tripura state committee of the CPI(M). In 1977, Tripura Legislative Assembly election he was elected for the first time on a CPI(M) ticket from Takarjala (Vidhan Sabha constituency).

== Revolution ==
=== Tripura Janasiksha Samiti ===
On 27 December 1945 AD (11th Pousa of 1352 BE) the Tripura Janasiksha Samiti came into being at Durgachoudhury Para under the Jirania Block. This organisation was established by several enlightened Tripuri youth, including Dasarath Deb, Sudhanwa Debbarma, Hemanta Debbarma and others with the purpose of setting up schools and spreading education among the children of the down-trodden Tripuris in the state of Tripura. The movement of the Janasiksha Samiti rapidly transformed into a mass movement.

In that time, the Maharaja Bir Bikram Kishore Debbarman's education minister Brown Sahib was compelled to open nearly three hundred schools in rural areas. The Samiti established 488 primary schools in different remote areas of the state with its active co-operation. Subsequently, in 1950–51, most of these schools were recognized by the State Government.

== List of works ==
Sudhanwa wrote many novels, poems and short stories. The first Kokborok magazine "Kwtal Kothoma" was published by him in 1954 AD.

=== Novels ===
Kokborok title	English title	Publisher	Year	Description	Reference
Chethuang			1954	A kokborok novel	
Hachuk Khurio (part-1)	In the lap of Hills	Kokborok Sahitya Sabha	1987	The first modern kokborok novel	
Hachuk Khurio (part-2)	In the lap of Hills		1994		

=== Poems ===
Kokborok title	English title	Publisher	Year
Himdi do			1983
Kha kwrak			1983

=== Drama ===
Year	Title	Publisher	Description	Reference
1948	Egiye Cholo		The first Kokborok Drama	
	Porikhit Bidruho			

== See also ==
- Dasarath Deb
- Bidya Debbarma
- Ganamukti Parishad
- Sunil Debbarma

== Bibliography ==
- Basu, Pradip Kumar (1996). The Communist Movement in Tripura. Progressive Publishers. ISBN 9788186383285.
- Association, Indian political science (2007). The Indian Journal of Political Science. Indian Political Science Association.
- Mohanta, Bijan (2004). Tripura in the Light of Socio-political Movements Since 1945. Progressive Publishers.
- Saikia, Yasmin; Baishya, Amit R. (2017). Northeast India A place of Relations. Cambridge University Press. ISBN 978-1-107-19129-7.
- Bareh, Hamlet (2001). Encyclopaedia of North-East India (8 ed.). Mittal Publications. ISBN 81-7099-787-9.
