= Nanda Kumar Deb Barma =

Indian playwright and poet

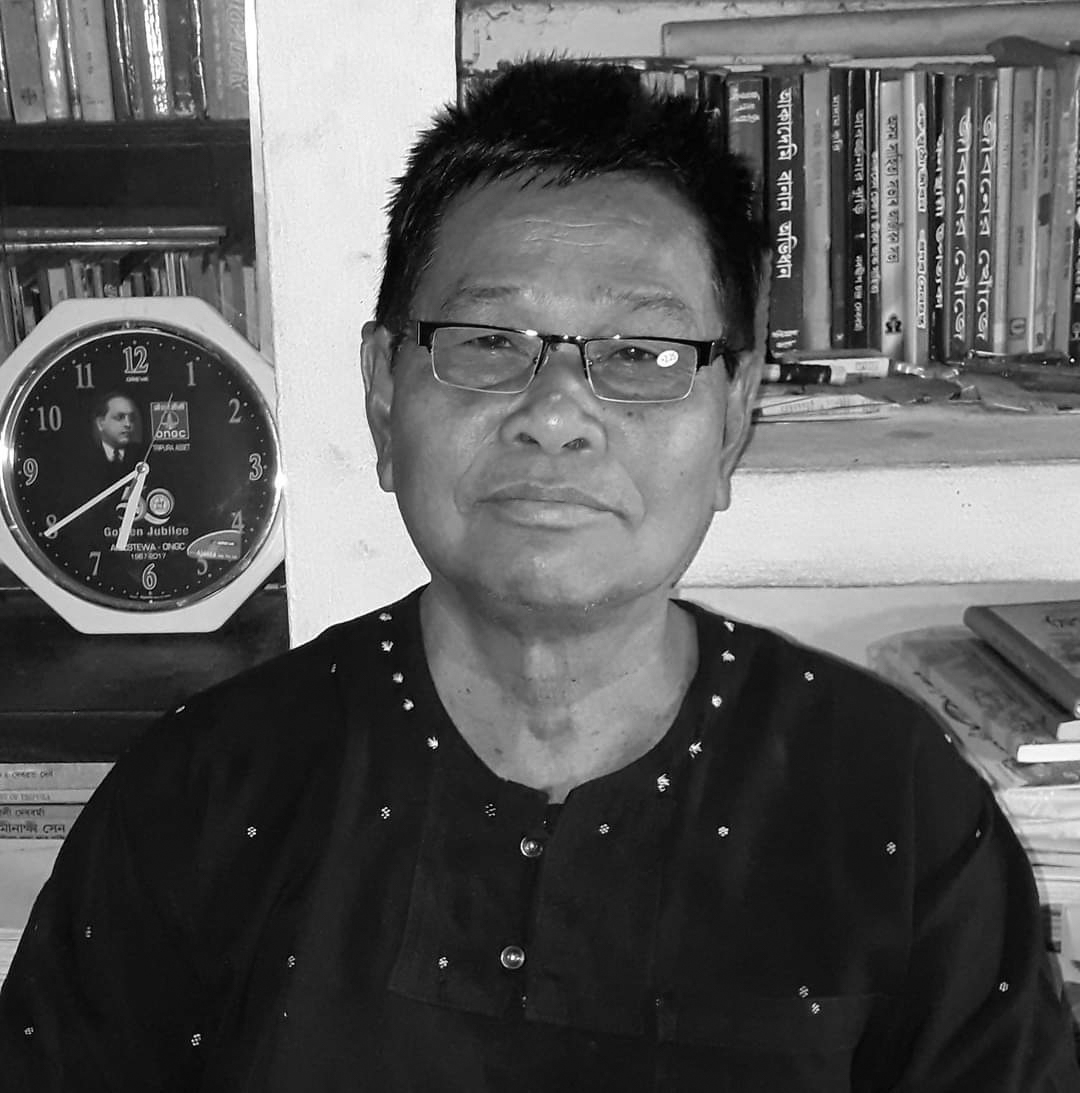
- Debbarma at his home
- Born: 21 July 1950 (age 76); Bishramganj, Tripura
- Education: MBB College (BA)
- Occupations: Playwright, poet, author, lyricist
- Writing career
- Language: Kokborok and Bengali
- Notable work: Longtoraini Eklobya
- Notable awards: Mahendra Smriti Puraskar, Rabindra Puraskar

Nanda Kumar Deb Barma is a Tipra playwright, poet, and lyricist from Tripura. He is known for literature in Kokborok language and Kokborok Drama. Nanda Kumar Deb Barma is author of novels such as Rung (2001), and compilations of works such as Thungnuk Bwchap (2015). He has been one of the active advocates for Kokborok development of literature and education and is the president of Kokborok Sahitya Sabha.

== Works ==
Bubar, Mukunne, Kokkisa, Koktanghai, Mari, Randijwkma, Sikhok, Reg-Swnam, Bolongni Muktarwi Sarao, Koktun, Khotalbai, Kwplai, Kantomoni, Imangni Bwsarok, Shehi Bukhukswk Ha, Nuai, Rung, Sundurjak, Yapiri, Dogar, Longtoraini Eklobyo, Bwsak Kaisao, Da-kuphur, Chobani Swkang, Swkango Choba, Kotor Buma-Bwsa.

== Selected published works ==
- Kokborok Poetry
- Simalwng Sakao Holongni Khum (Stone Flowers at the Pyre)
- Bolongni Bwsagursong Mwsao (Dances of Jungle Girls)
- Ani Ganao Ang (Me beside me)
- Dugmalino (To a Flower)

Translated Works

- The Story (2005)
- A Trip to the Shakhangtang Hill (2005)
