= Kokborok tei Hukumu Mission =

Kokborok tei Hukumu Mission (KOHM) is a non-political, non-religious organization whose mission is to promote the development and preservation of Tripuri literature, culture, tradition, and its heritage.

== National ==
The members of theKokborok tei Hukumu Mission were invited as the Informant of the Kokborok for M.A. final year in 2003 for the Department of Linguistics, University of Delhi in New Delhi, India. There, the Kokborok was discussed at length and the department from remarked the Kokborok as one of the richest languages in the world. About 19 students from the countries of India, Sri Lanka, Bangladesh, Yemen, Thailand and Vietnam have attended classes there.

== Radio ==
The members of the Kokborok tei Hukumu Mission have been conducting Kokborok programs in All India Radio, Agartala since April 1995.

== Major publications ==
Simultaneously, the publication of Kokborok and other books has also occurred and about 36 titles have been published since its formation.

=== Kokborok Dictionary ===
KOHM is the publisher of the authoritative dictionary in the Kokborok language, compiled by Binoy Debbarma in two editions. Anglo-Kokborok-Bengali Dictionary (2nd edition with Bengali), 2002.
