= Kokborok =

Sino-Tibetan language spoken in India and Bangladesh

Kokborok, Tiprakok
- Tripuri, Tripura, Tipra, Tippera
- Kokborok
- Native to: India, Bangladesh
- Region: Northeast India; Tripura; Assam; Mizoram; Myanmar; Bangladesh; Chittagong Division; Chittagong Hill Tracts; Chandpur District; Feni District; Noakhali District; Comilla District; Sylhet Division; Sylhet District; Dhaka Division; Rajbari District
- Ethnicity: Tripuri
- Native speakers: 1,300,000 (2011)
- Language family: Sino-Tibetan: Tibeto-Burman; Central Tibeto-Burman (?); Sal; Boro–Garo; Kokborok, Tiprakok
- Early form: Early Tipra
- Writing system: Koloma (original); Bengali–Assamese script; Latin script; Kokmari script (Unofficial)

Official status
- Official language in: India: Tripura

Language codes
- ISO 639-3: Variously: trp – Kokborok ria – Riang tpe – Tippera usi – Usui xtr – Early Tripuri
- Glottolog: tipp1238
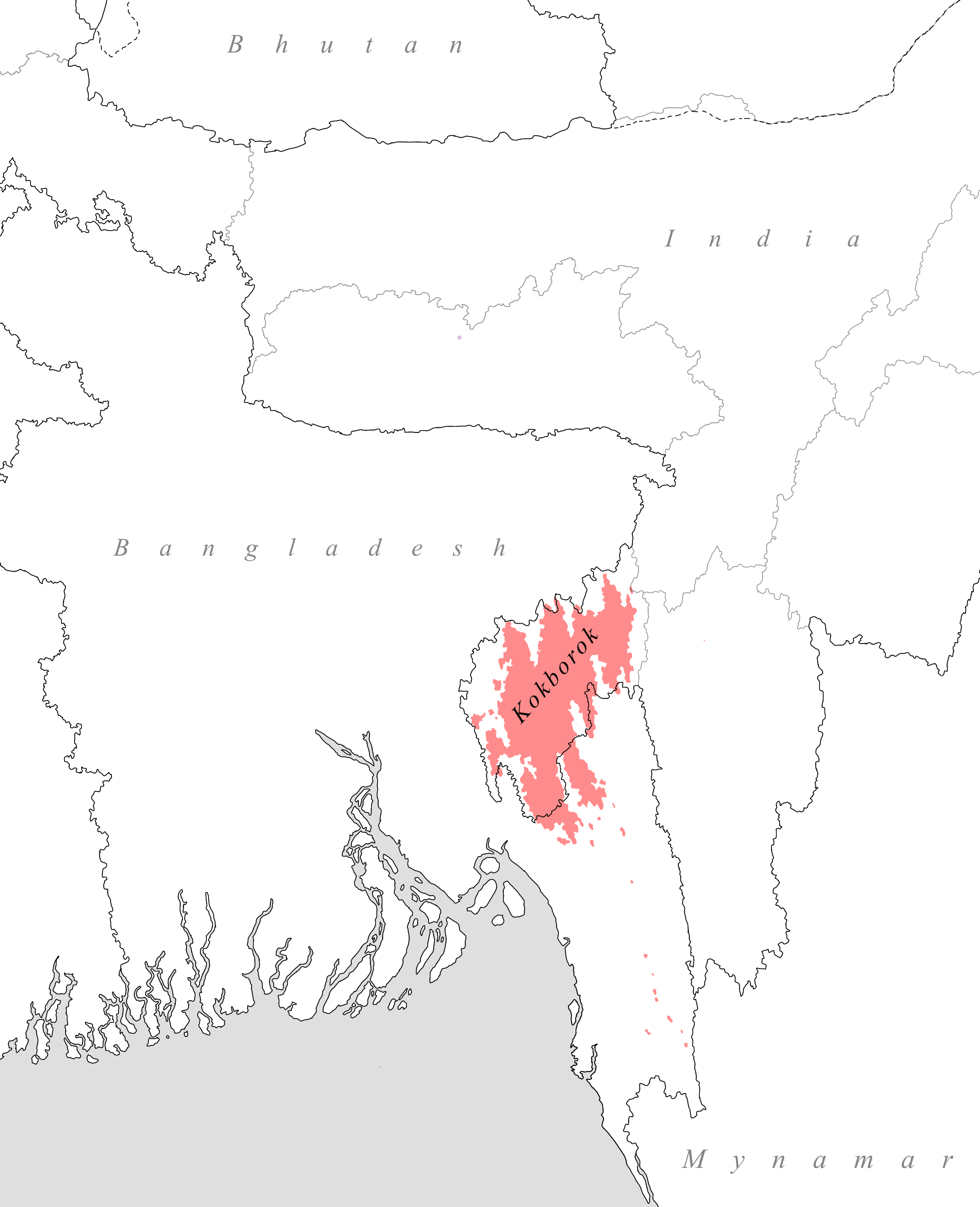
- Kokborok speaking area

- Kokborok is classified as Vulnerable by the UNESCO Atlas of the World's Languages in Danger.

Kokborok (or Tripuri) is a Tibeto-Burman language of the Indian state of Tripura and neighbouring areas of Bangladesh. Its name comes from kók meaning "verbal" or "language" and borok meaning "people" or "human". It is one of the ancient languages of Northeast India.

== History ==
The language was traditionally known as Tripuri or Tipra Kok, while the name Kokborok became widely adopted during the 20th century. The names also refer to the inhabitants of the former Twipra kingdom, as well as the ethnicity of its speakers.

According to Tripuri oral tradition, the language dates back to at least the 1st century AD, when the historical record of Tripuri kings began to be written down in a book called the Rajratnakar or Rajmala, using a script for Kókborok called "Koloma", traditionally attributed to the scholar and priest Durlabendra Chantai (also spelled Durlobendra Chontai). In the early 15th century, under the reign of Dharma Manikya I, two Brahmins, Sukreswar and Vaneswar, compiled a Rajmala, translating it into Sanskrit and into Bengali. However, many early Kokborok records were lost or fell out of use over time; the main sources for Tripura history are the Sanskrit and Bengali manuscripts.

Kokborok was relegated to a common people's dialect during the rule of the Tripuri kings in the Kingdom of Tipra from the 19th century till the 20th century. Kokborok was declared an official language of the state of Tripura, India by the state government in the year 1979. Consequently, the language has been taught in schools of Tripura from the primary level to the higher secondary stage since the 1980s. A certificate course in Kokborok started from 1994 at Tripura University and a post graduate diploma in Kokborok was started in 2001 by the Tripura University. Kokborok was introduced in the Bachelor of Arts (BA) degree in the colleges affiliated to the Tripura University from the year 2012, and a Master of Arts (MA) degree in Kokborok was started by Tripura University from the year 2015.

There is currently a demand for giving the language recognition as one of the recognized official languages of India as per the 8th schedule of the Constitution. The official form is the dialect spoken in Agartala, the state capital of Tripura.

== Classification and related languages ==
Kokborok is a Sino-Tibetan language of the Bodo–Garo branch.

It is related to the Bodo and Dimasa languages of neighboring Assam. The Garo language is also a related language spoken in the state of Meghalaya and neighboring Bangladesh.

Kókborok consists of several dialects spoken in Tripura. Ethnologue lists Usoi (Kau Brung), Riang (Kau Bru), and Khagrachari ("Trippera") as separate languages; Mukchak (Barbakpur), though not listed, is also distinct, and the language of many Tripuri clans has not been investigated. The greatest variety is within Khagrachari, though speakers of different Khagrachari varieties can "often" understand each other. Khagrachari literature is being produced in the Naitong and Dendak varieties.

== Phonology ==
Kókborok has the phonology of a typical Sino-Tibetan language.

=== Vowels ===
According to Jacquesson (2008) and Veikho & Mushahary (2015), Kokborok has six phonemic monophthongs: /i u e ə o a/.

Monophthongs
	Front	Central	Back
Close	i		u
Mid	e	ə	o
Open		a	

- /e/ is pronounced [ɛ] interconsonantally and [e] in open syllables.
- /ə/ is pronounced closer to [ɨ] in some localities and closer to [o] in others.
- /o/ is pronounced more open [ɔ] in closed syllables and [o] elsewhere.

There are two phonemic diphthongs, /ai/ and /əi/. /əi/ is rounded to [ui] after /m/ and /b/.

In contrast with more recent sources, Karapurkar (1972)'s analysis somewhat differs, though in part with more precise phonetic descriptions:

- /i/ is described phonetically as [ɪ].
- /u/ is described to have free variation between [u ~ ʊ].
- /e/ is treated instead as /ɛ/, with free variation between [ɛ ~ e̞].
- /ə/ is treated as two separate phonemes, /ɯ/ and /ʌ/ (the latter described phonetically as mid-centralized [ʌ̽]), though it is noted that they do not contrast with each other and are in complementary distribution: /ʌ/ is always followed by /a/ or /ʌ/ in the following syllable, while /ɯ/ never is.
- /o/ is treated instead as /ɔ/, with free variation between [ɔ ~ o].

=== Consonants ===
Consonants
		Bilabial	Alveolar	Palatal (-alveolar)	Velar	Glottal
Nasal		m	n		ŋ	
Plosive/ Affricate	tenuis	p	t	tʃ	k	
Plosive/ Affricate	aspirated	pʰ	tʰ	tʃʰ	kʰ	
Plosive/ Affricate	voiced	b	d	dʒ	ɡ	
Fricative			s			h
Approximant		w	l	j		
Vibrant			r			

The stop onset of the affricates may weaken or fully neutralize /tʃ(ʰ), dʒ/ → [ʃ, ʒ], and may also front /tʃ, dʒ/ → [ts, dz]. For the voiced affricate, both neutralization and fronting may occur, /dʒ/ → [z]. Fricative /s/ may also have an affricate allophone [tsʰ].

/n/ may have a palatal allophone [ɲ].

=== Syllables ===
Most words are formed by combining the root with an affix:

- kuchuk is formed from the root chuk (to be high), with the prefix, ku.
- phaidi (come) is formed from the root phai (to come), with the suffix di.

There are no Kókborok words beginning with ng. At the end of a syllable, any vowel except w can be found, along with a limited number of consonants: p, k, m, n, ng, r and l. /j/ is found only in closing diphthongs like ai and wi.

=== Clusters ===
"Clusters" are a group of consonants at the beginning of a syllable, like phl, ph + l, in phlat phlat (very fast), or sl in kungsluk kungsluk (foolish man). Clusters are quite impossible at the end of a syllable. There are some "false clusters" such as phran (to dry) which is actually phw-ran. These are very common in echo words: phlat phlat, phre phre, prai prai, prom prom, etc.

=== Tone ===
There are two tones in Kókborok: high tone and low tone. To mark the high tone, the letter h is written after the vowel with the high tone. These examples have low tone preceding high tone to show that tone changes the meaning:

1. lai easy laih crossed
2. bor senseless bohr to plant
3. cha correct chah to eat
4. nukhung family nukhuhng roof

== Grammar ==
There is a clear-cut difference between nouns and verbs. All true verbs are made with a verbal root followed by a number of suffixes, which are placed not randomly but according to definite rules.

=== Morphology ===
Morphologically Kókborok words can be divided into five categories. They are the following.

1. Original words: thang – go; phai – come; borok – nation; bororok – men kotor – big; kuchuk – high; kwrwi – not; etc.
2. Compound words, that is, words made of more than one original words: nai – see; thok – tasty; naithok – beautiful; mwtai – God; nok – house; tongthar – religion; bwkha – heart; bwkhakotor – brave; etc.
3. Words with suffixes: swrwng – learn; swrwngnai – learner; nukjak – seen; kaham – good; hamya – bad; etc.
4. Naturalized loan words: gerogo – to roll; gwdna – neck; tebil – table; poitu – faith; etc.
5. Loan words: kiching – friend; etc.

== Numbers ==
Counting in Kókborok is called lekhamung.

1	sa (one)
2	nwi (two)
3	tham
4	brwi
5	ba
6	dok
7	sni
8.	char
9	chuku
10	chi
20	nwichi (khol)
100	ra
101	ra sa
200	nwira
1000	sai
1001	sai sa
2000	nwi sai
10,000	chisai
20,000	nwichi sai
100,000	rasai
200,000	nwi rasai
1,000,000	chirasai
2,000,000	nwichi rasai
10,000,000	rwjak
20,000,000	nwi rwjak
1,000,000,000	rarwjak
1,000,000,000,000	sai rarwjak
100,000,000,000,000,000,000	rasaisai rarwjak

== Dialects ==
There are many Kokborok-speaking people in the Indian states of West Bengal, Tripura, Assam, and Mizoram. But, there are also speakers in the neighboring provinces in the country of Bangladesh, mainly in the Chittagong Hill Tracts.

There are three main dialects of Kokborok, which are mutually intelligible. The standard one is Debbarma (Puratan Tripuri), which is spoken by the royal family and is understood by all the dialect groups. It is the medium of instruction up to class five and is taught as a subject up to graduate level. The two other major dialects are Riang (or Reang) and Noatia. Smaller dialects are Jamatia, Koloi and Rupini.

== Literature ==
The first efforts of writing Kokborok were made by Radhamohan Thakur. He wrote the grammar of Kokborok named "Kókborokma" published in 1900, as well as two other books: Tripur Kothamala and Tripur Bhasabidhan. Tripur Kothamala was the Kokborok-Bengali-English translation book published in 1906. The "Tripur Bhasabidhan" was published in 1907.

Daulot Ahmed was a contemporary of Radhamohan Thakur and was a pioneer of writing Kókborok Grammar jointly with Mohammad Omar. The Amar jantra, Comilla published his Kókborok grammar book "KOKBOKMA" in 1897.

On 27 December 1945 the "Tripura Janasiksha Samiti" came into being, and it established many schools in different areas of Tripura.

The first Kókborok magazine Kwtal Kothoma was edited and published in 1954 by Sudhanya Deb Barma, who was a founder of the Samiti. Hachuk Khurio (In the lap of Hills) by Sudhanya Deb Barma is the first modern Kókborok novel. It was published by the Kókborok Sahitya Sabha and Sanskriti Samsad in 1987. One major translation of the 20th century was the "Smai Kwtal", the New Testament of the Bible in Kókborok language, published in 1976 by the Bible Society of India.

The 21st century began for Kókborok literature with the monumental work, the Anglo-Kókborok-Bengali Dictionary compiled by Binoy Deb Barma and published in 2002 AD by the Kókborok tei Hukumu Mission. This is the 2nd edition of his previous groundbreaking dictionary published in 1996 and is a trilingual dictionary. Twiprani Laihbuma (The Rajmala – History of Tripura) translated by R. K. Debbarma and published in 2002 by KOHM.

The present trend of development of the Kokborok literary works show that Kokborok literature is moving forward to touch the literature of the languages.

== Educational institutions ==
There are two universities in Tripura which provide Kokborok language courses as part of Bachelors, Masters and Doctorate degrees. There are more than 20 colleges in Tripura state where Kokborok is taught as part of the undergraduate courses. Also, there are more than 30 Government schools where Kokborok is taught in the higher secondary school level under the Tripura Board of Secondary Education.

=== Department of Kokborok, Tripura University ===
The Department of Kokborok in Tripura University, Agartala is responsible for the teaching of Kokborok language and literature and started functioning in 2015.

It runs an M.A (Master of Arts) in Kokborok language, a one-year PG Diploma and a 6-month Certificate course.

The university grants Bachelor of Arts (B.A) degrees with Kokborok as an elective subject in its various constituent colleges since 2012. The colleges affiliated to the university where Kokborok is taught in the B.A degree are:

- Holy Cross College, Agartala
- Ramthakur College, Agartala
- St. Paul's College, Agartala
- Government Degree College, Khumulwng
- NS Mahavidyalaya, Udaipur
- Government Degree College, Dharmanagar
- RS Mahavidyala, Kailasahar
- Government Degree College, Teliamura
- Government Degree College, Santirbazar
- Government Degree College, Longtharai Valley
- SV Mahavidyalaya, Mohanpur
- MMD Government Degree College, Sabroom
- RT Mahavidyalaya, Bishalgarh
- Dasarath Deb Memorial College, Khowai

=== Department of Kokborok, Maharaja Bir Bikram (MBB) University ===
The Department of Kokborok in Maharaja Bir Bikram University, Agartala is responsible for the teaching of Kokborok language and literature. This was made a State University in 2015.

MBB university has two affiliated colleges where Kokborok courses are available:

- BBM College, Agartala
- MBB College, Agartala

== Statistics ==
=== 2011 Census of India ===
The details as per the Census of India, 2011 regarding Tripuri language is given as follows:

Tripuri 1,011,294

1. Kokborok 917,900
2. Reang 58,539
3. Tripuri 33,138
4. Others 1,717

=== 2001 Census of India ===
Tripuri 854,023

1. Kokborok 761,964
2. Reang 76,450
3. Tripuri 15,002
4. Others 607

== Script ==
Kokborok had a script known as Koloma, developed in the 1st century AD and used by the Royal Family of Tripura. The Rajratnakar is believed to have originally been written in Koloma. This script fell out of use after the 14th century, and is widely considered to have been lost.

From the 19th century, the Kingdom of Twipra used the Bengali script to write in Kokborok, but since the independence of India and the merger with India, the Roman script is being promoted by non-governmental organizations. The Tripura Tribal Areas Autonomous District Council government made regulations in 1992 and 2000 for adoption of the Roman script in the school education system in its areas.

The script issue is highly politicized, with the Left Front government advocating usage of the Bengali script and all the regional indigenous parties and student organizations (INPT, IPFT, NCT, Twipra Students Federation, etc.) and ethnic nationalist organizations (Kokborok Sahitya Sabha, Kokborok tei Hukumu Mission, Movement for Kokborok etc.) advocating for the Roman script. Both scripts are now used in the state in education as well as in literary and cultural circles. Proposals have previously been made for the adoption of scripts other than the Bengali or Roman scripts, such as Ol Chiki. There have also been scripts created specifically for Kokborok in modern times.

== See also ==
- Tripuri literature
- Tripuri Manipuri language
- Kokborok drama
- Kokborok Day
- Kokborok grammar
- Languages with official status in India
- Kokborok cinema
- Kokborok tei Hukumu Mission
- Tribal Research and Cultural Institute
