= Bongshar =

- Village
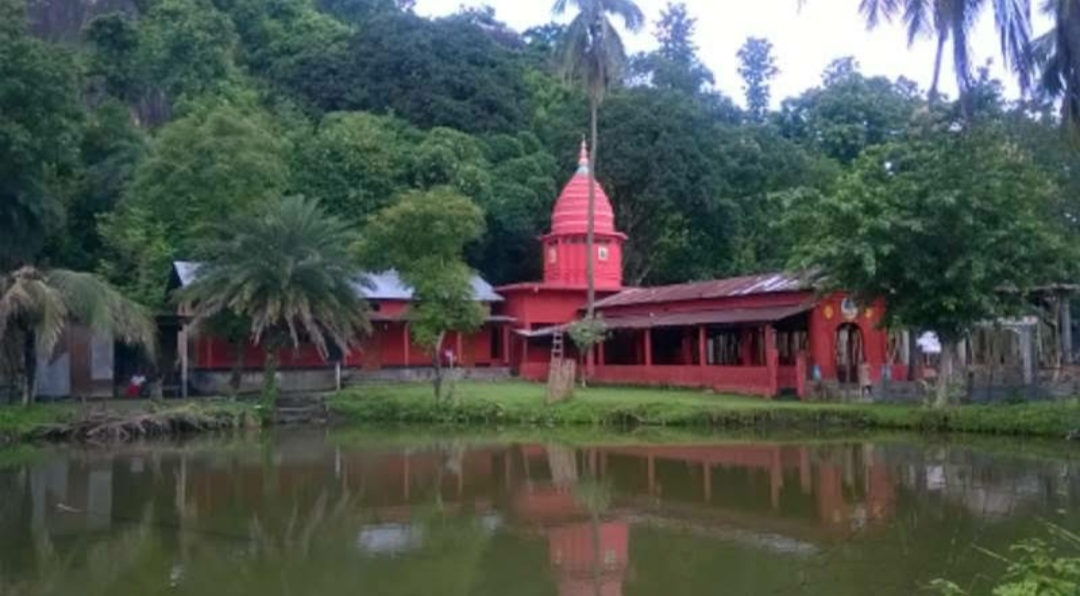
- Bhringeswar Devalaya, Bongshar
- Nickname: Gateway of Sualkuchi (The Manchester of East)
- Location in Assam, India Bongshar (India)
- Coordinates: 26.1984103°N 91.5606095°E
- Country: India
- State: Assam
- District: Kamrup
- Region: Lower Assam

Government
  - Type: Gram Panchayat
- Elevation: 35 m (115 ft)

Population (2011)
  - Total: 2,109

Languages
  - Official: Assamese
- Time zone: UTC+5:30 (IST)
- Postal code: 781103
- ISO 3166 code: IN-AS
- Vehicle registration: AS-25, AS-01
- Website: www.kamrup.nic.in

Bongshar is an important village in Kamrup district in the Indian state of Assam. It is situated on the north bank of the river Brahmaputra, about 25 km from the capital city of Assam, Guwahati under is a block of Kamrup District. It has a large number of cottage industry engaged in handloom, for which is a part of Sualkuchi, also known as the "Manchester of Assam".

== About ==
Bongshar is a historical place situated in the Kamrup District of Assam. It is between the Silk village Sualkuchi & the holy place Hajo. Bongshar has a glorious history from the day of ‘Ramayana’ & ‘Mahabharata’.

== Tourist attractions ==
Bhringeswar Devalaya, On the way to Sualkuchi village, there is a small lane that leads to this ancient temple on the foothill of Gandhamoan. The present temple is probably constructed by Siva Singha in 18th CE.

== Silk center ==
This is the major part of the textile center of Assam. Muga silk and Pat silk along with Eri silk and Endi cloth from this region are famous for its quality. Mekhela chadors and Gamosas made from this indigenous materials are in demand throughout Assam as well as other parts of India. It's part of registered trademark is Sualkuchi.

== Geography ==
Bongshar village is located in Kamrup district of Assam. The village is well connected by road with the city of Guwahati to Central Assam and Nalbari, to the west.

== Education ==
Bongshar has numbers of educational instructions here is the list of them :

- Bongshar Higher Secondary School
- Bongshar Jalti Das Ucchatar Madhyamik Vidyalaya
- Bongshar MV School
- Bhringwsar High School, Bongshar
- Bongshar Bhirngeswar LP School
- Bongshar Gondhmow LP School
- Sanpara LP School, Bongshar
- Sankardev Sishu Vidyaniketan, Bongshar
- Abhaypuria Pam LP School
