= Tripuri dress =

Dress worn by the Tripuri people of India

Tripuris have their own traditional dresses. This type of dress is similar to that of the rest of the North-East Indian people, but the pattern and design differs significantly.

== Female dresses ==
The dress for women for the lower half of the body is called a rignai in Tripuri. For the upper half of the body, the cloth has two parts: the risa and the rikutu. The risa covers the chest part, and the rikutu' covers whole of upper half of the body. In the yesteryears these garments used to be woven by the ladies by home spun thread made from the cotton. Nowadays the threads are bought from the market and the risa is not worn; instead a blouse is worn by most Tripuri women because of convenience. In the present day, young girls are wearing rignai with tops as well.

== Rignai designs ==
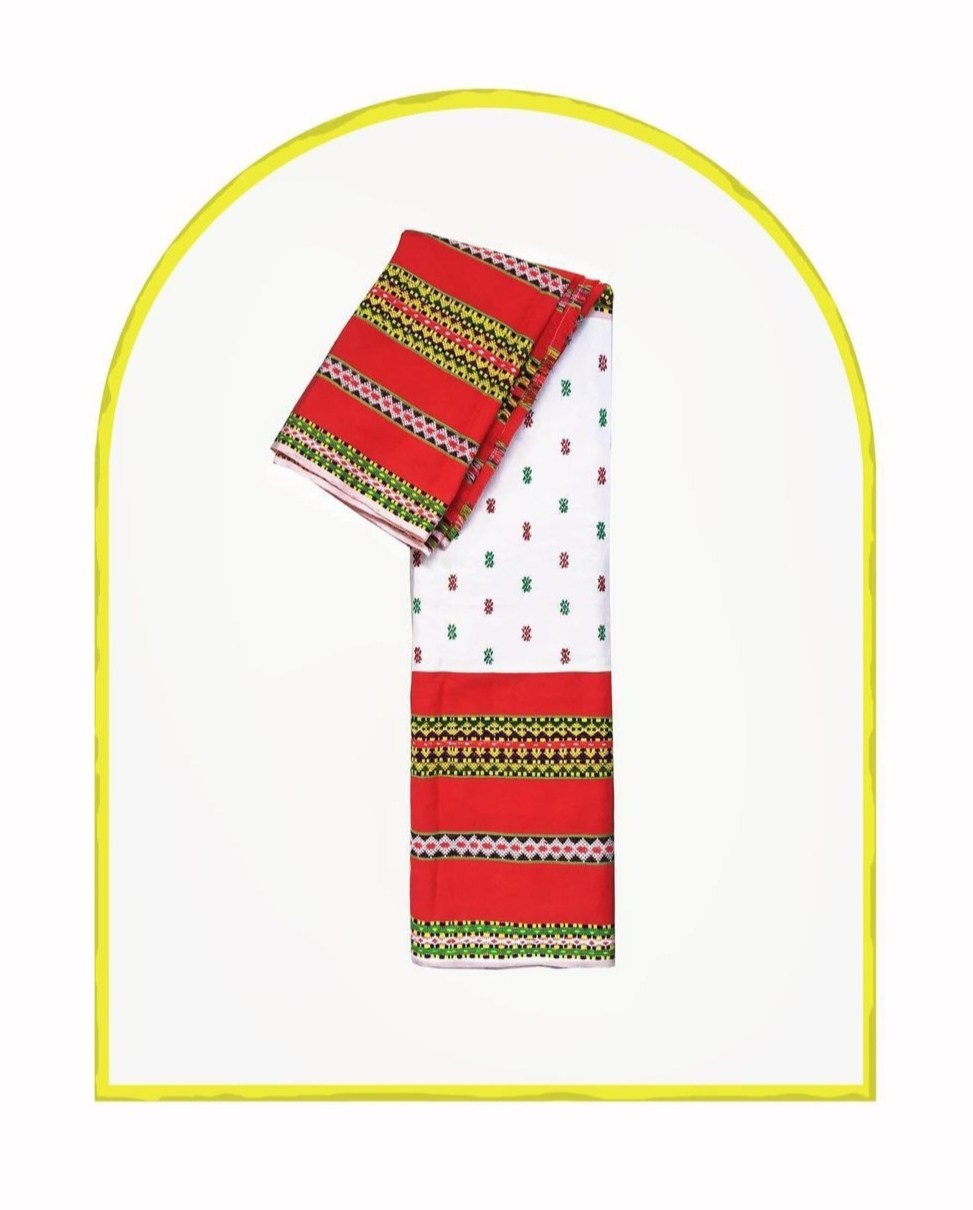
Rignai chamathwibar

Each of the clans of Tripuri has their own rignai pattern and design. The pattern of the rignai are so distinct that the clan of a Tripuri woman can be identified by the pattern of the rignai she wears. Nowadays there is inter-mingling of the rignai, and different clans are wearing rignai of other clans freely and new designs are being woven differently. The rikutu is plain cloth of a different colour and shade than the other items of clothing. Today, the rikutu is woven by Tripuri women. Rignai chamathwibar is the most significant Tripuri rignai. It is known as the mother of all rignais, as all the other rignais have evolved from rignai chamathwibar.

Different types of designs fashion that are woven in the rignai borok by Tripuri women are as follows:

- Anji
- Banarosi
- Chamthwibar
- Jirabi
- Khamjang
- Khumbar
- Kuaiphang
- Kuaichu
- Kuaichu bokobom
- Kuaichu ulta
- Malibar
- Miyong
- Muikhunchok
- Monaisora
- Muisili
- Natupalia
- Phantokbar
- Sada
- Salu
- Similik yapai
- Takhumtei
- Temanlia
- Thaimaikrang
- Thaiphlokbar
- Tokbakbar
- Tokha
- Toksa
- Toiling
- Toprengsakhitung
- Rignaichamwthwi
- Rignai mereng
- Metereng trang
- Rignai khamchwi
- Kwsakwpra
- Rignaibru
- Rignaikosong
- Kwsapra
- Songkai
- Sorbangi
- and many more...

It is said that at the time of Subrai Raja, the most famous and legendary King of Tripura, through his 250 wives he had invented two hundred fifty designs of rignai. He married those woman whoever invented a new design. But all these design had lost in time and only few are retained till date. The effort to re-discover the lost designs is in process.

== Male costume ==
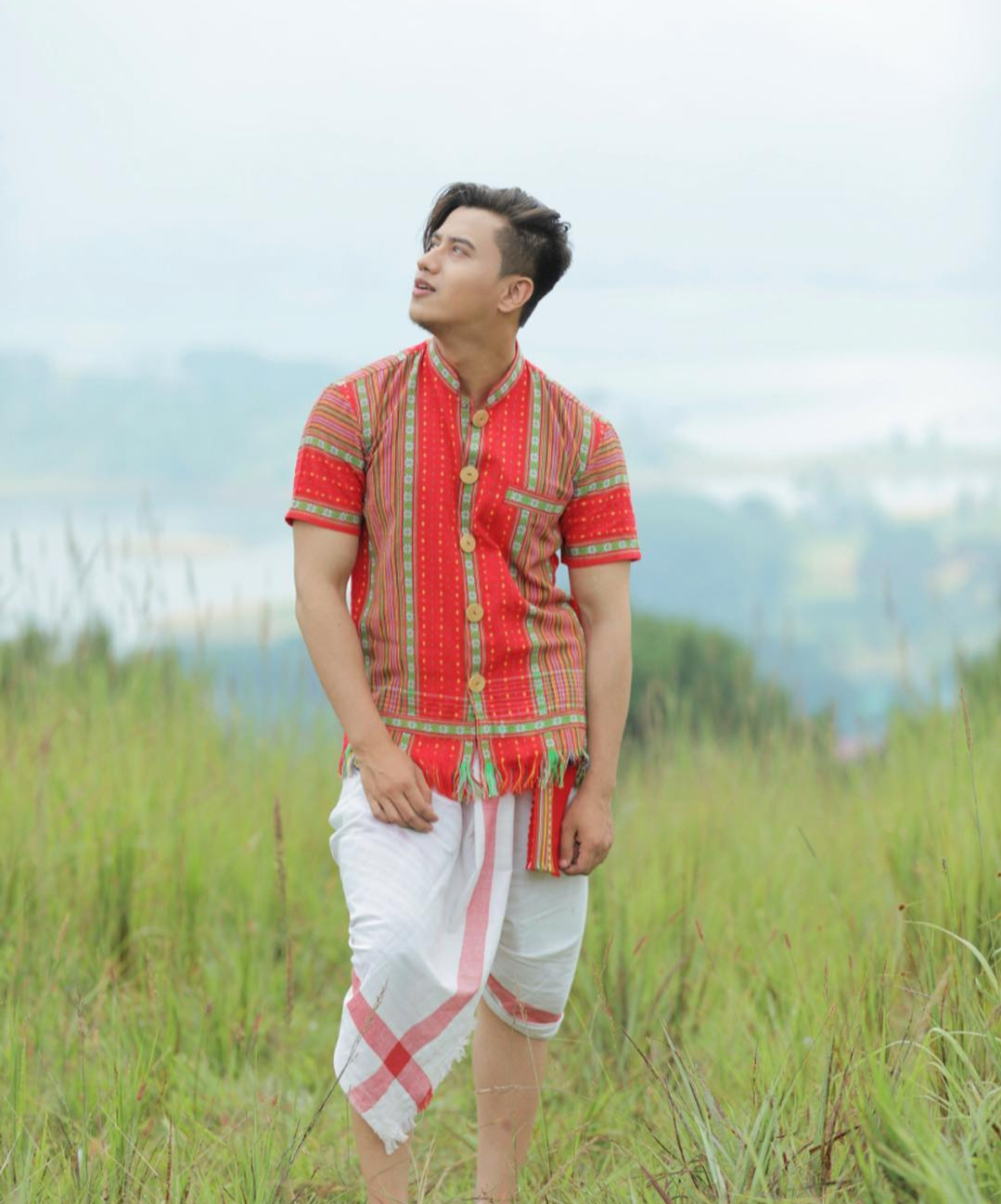
Tripuri man in traditional attire

The male counterpart for the loin area is the rikutu and for the upper part of the body is the kamchwlwi borok. Today, however, very few men wear this style of dress, except in rural Tripura and by the working class. Males have adopted more modern dressing styles of the international style gaffa. This is somewhat similar to kurta and dhoti.

== Gallery ==
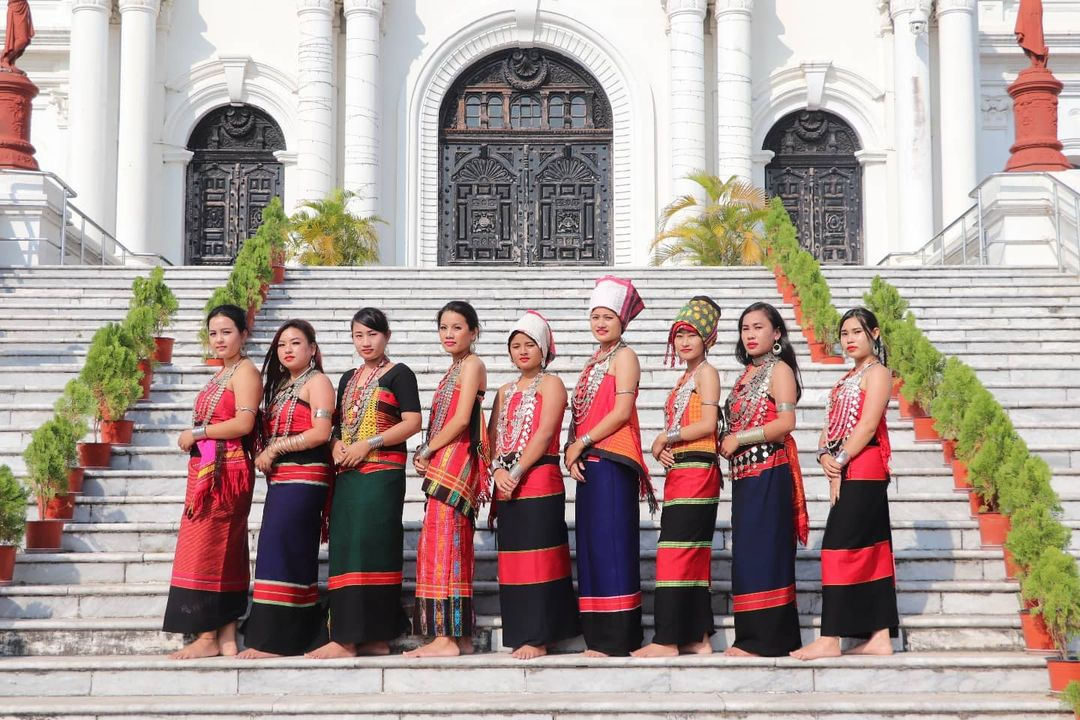
Tripura girls in their traditional attire

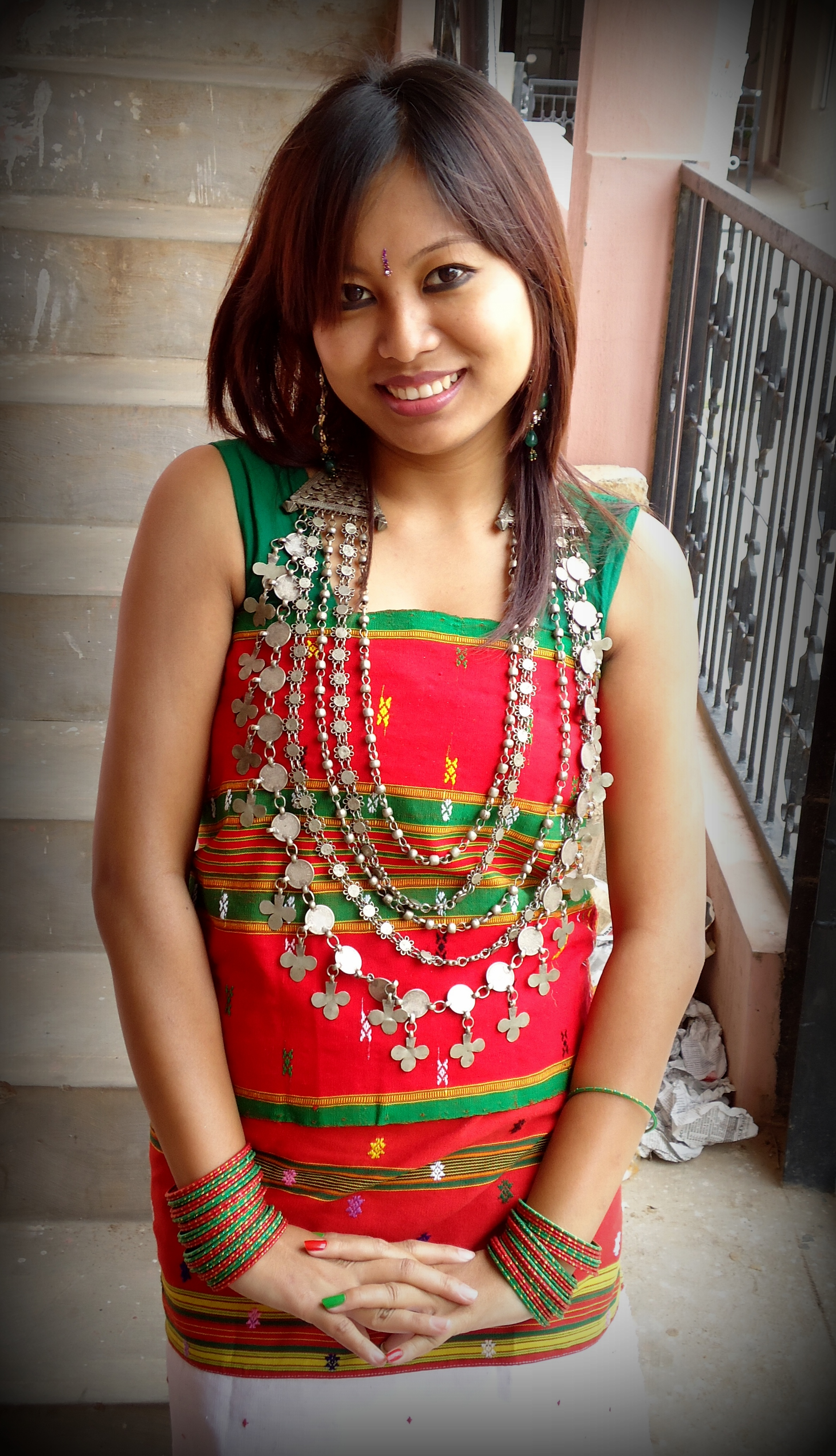
A Tripuri girl in rigwnai and risa

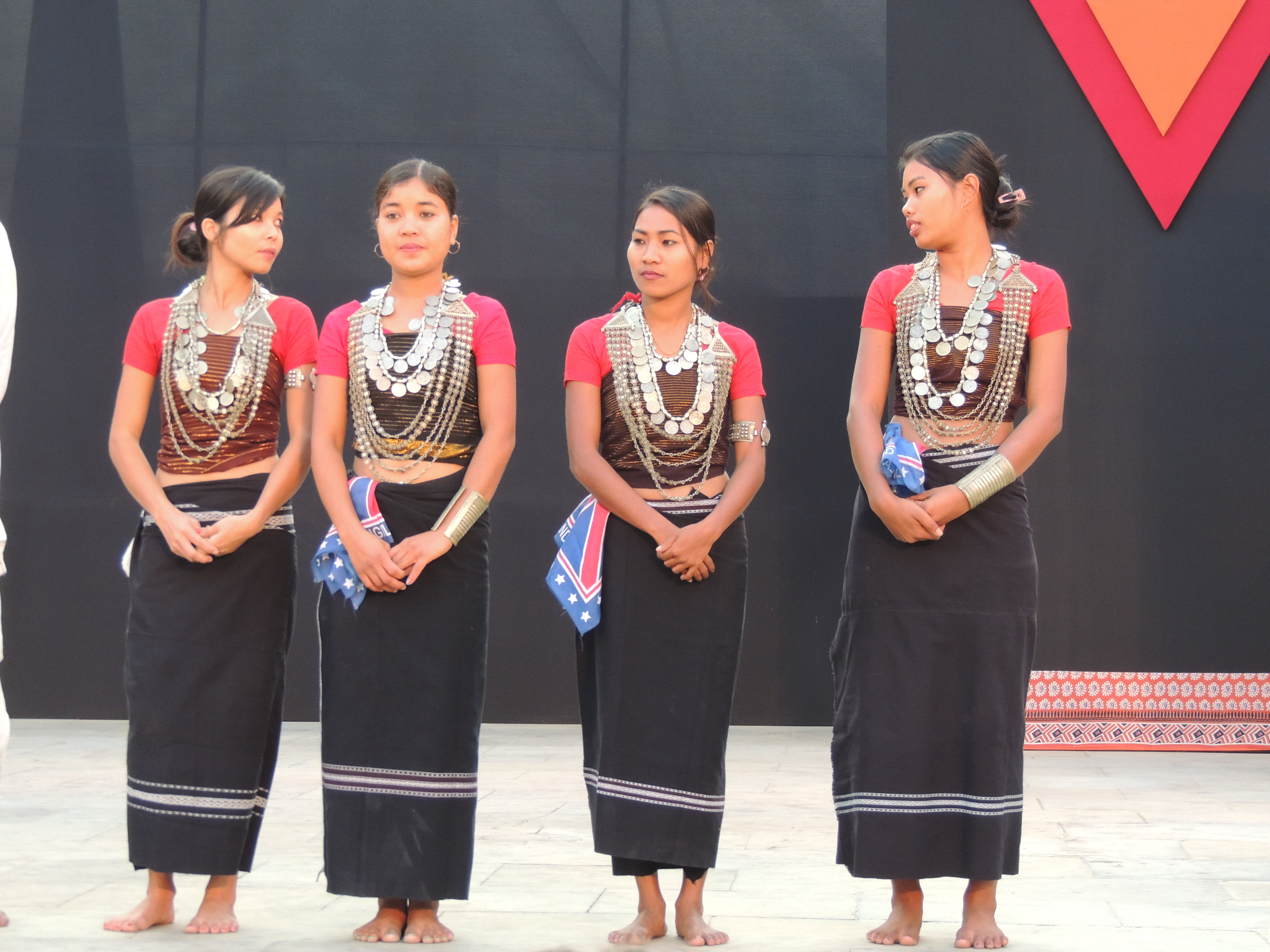
Performers getting ready to do the Hojagiri, a dance of the Reang community

A pattern of rigwnai worn by the Debbarmas.

== See also ==
- Tripuri culture
