= Sualkuchi =

Sualkuchi Soalkuchi
- Town
- Sualkuchi Town
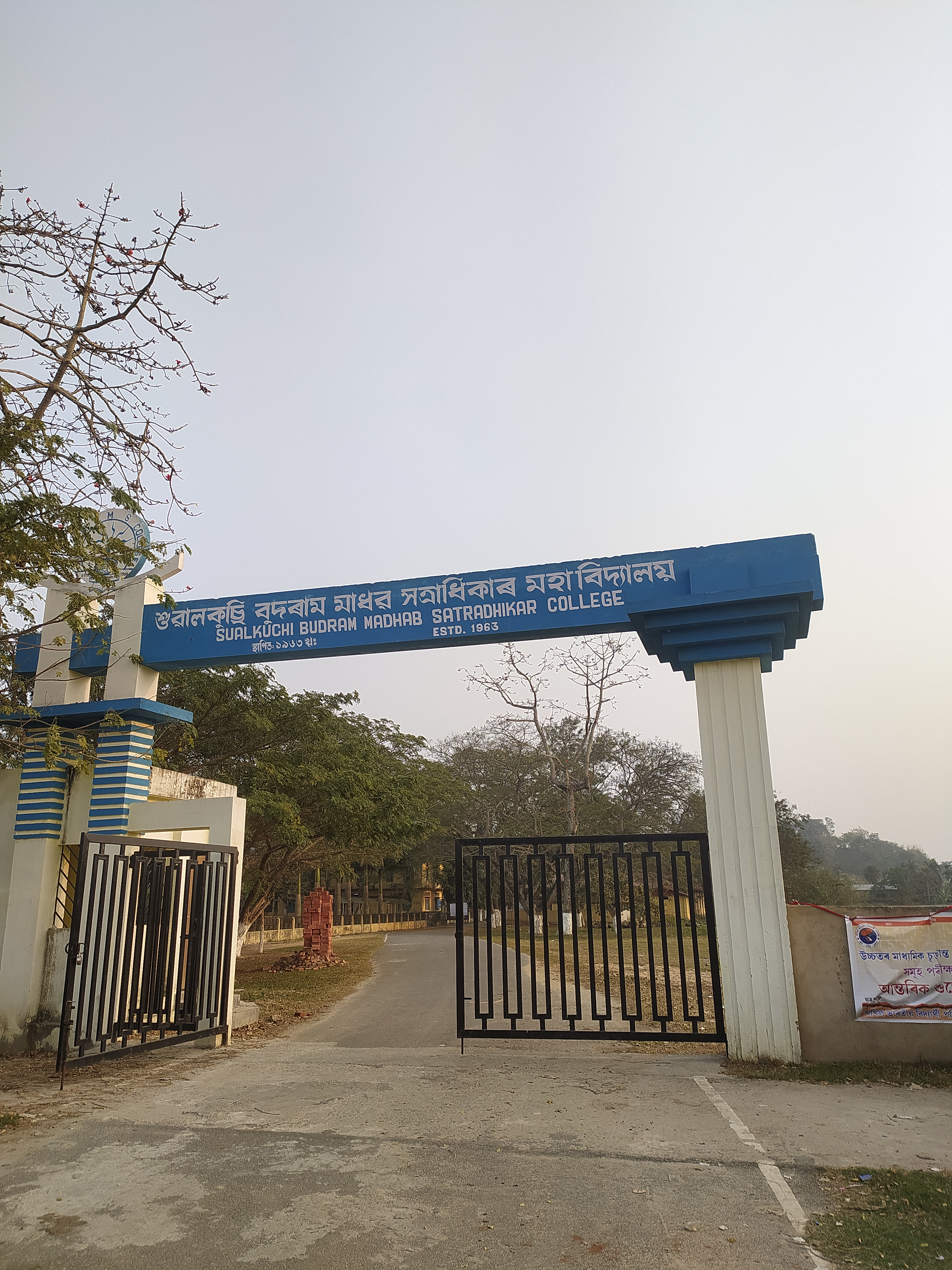
- Sualkuchi Budhram Madhab Satradhikar College
- Nickname: Manchester of Assam
- Location in Assam, India Sualkuchi (India)
- Coordinates: 26.17°N 91.57°E
- Country: India
- State: Assam
- District: Kamrup
- Elevation: 35 m (115 ft)

Population (2001)
  - Total: 14,129

Languages
  - Official: Assamese
- Time zone: UTC+5:30 (IST)
- ISO 3166 code: IN-AS
- Vehicle registration: AS

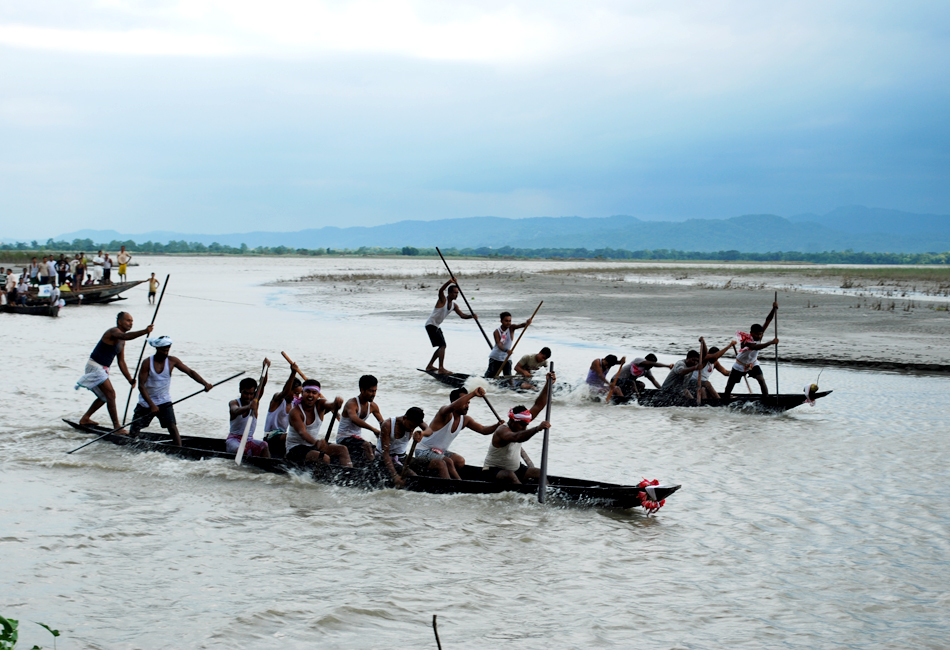
Rowing competition of Sualkuchi at Brahmaputra River

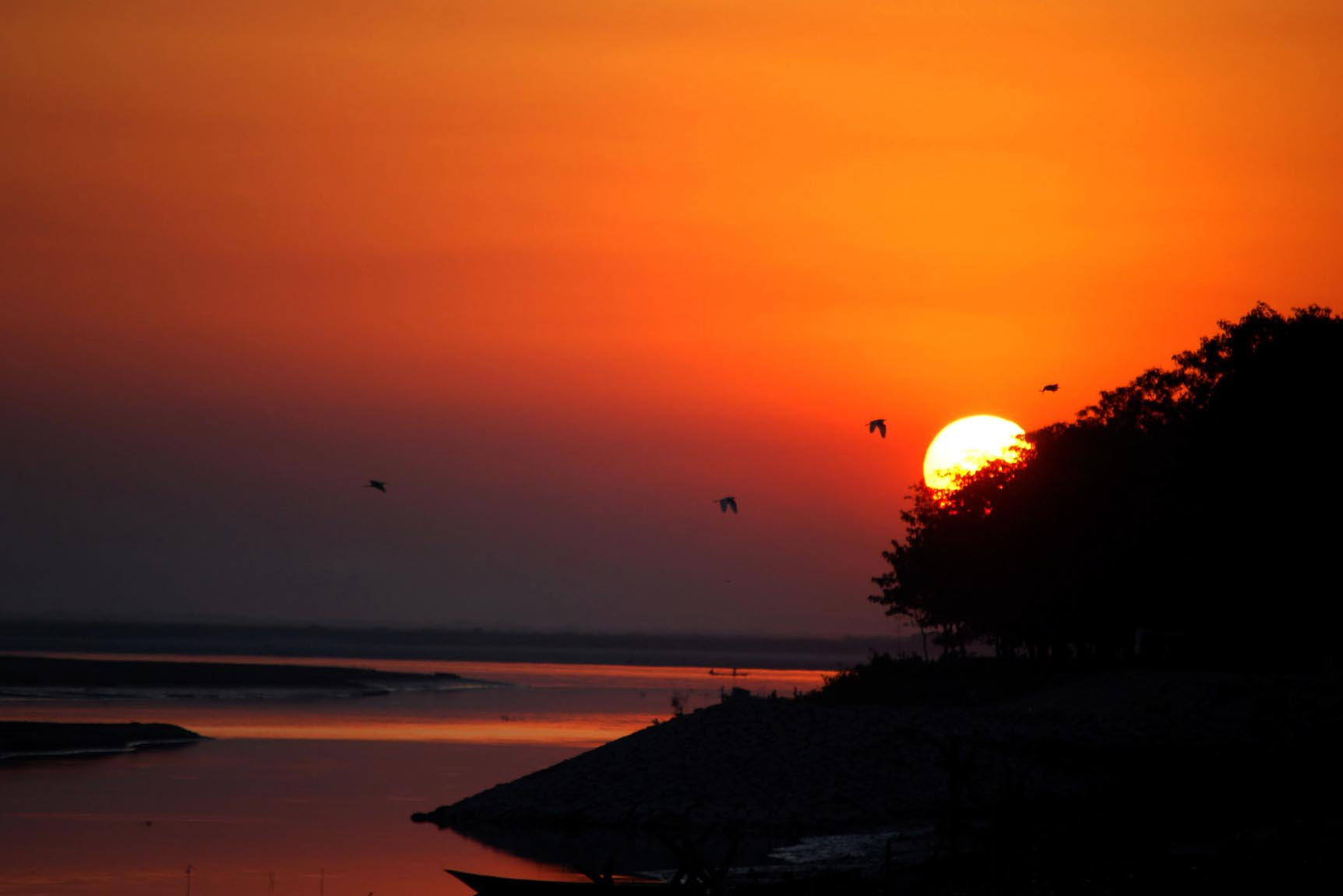
Sunset

Sualkuchi (Pron: ˈsʊɑ:lˌkʊʧɪ, Assamese pronunciation: [xualkusi]) is a census town in Kamrup district in the Indian state of Assam. It is situated on the north bank of the river Brahmaputra, about 35 km from Guwahati, Sualkuchi is a block of Kamrup District. It has large number of cottage industry engaged in handloom, for which it is also known as the "Manchester of Assam".

Sidheswar Devalaya at Sualkuchi is an ancient Siva temple, built during the time of Ahom King Siva Singha's rule. A few images of archeological interest exist at the site.

Gandhi Aashram at Sualkuchi is newly developed along River Banks

== Silk center ==
This is the textile center of Assam. Muga silk and Pat silk along with Eri silk and Endi cloth from this region is famous for its quality. Mekhela chadors and Gamosas made from this indigenous materials is in demand throughout Assam as well as other parts of India. Its registered trademark is SUALKUCHI'S.

== Geography ==
Sualkuchi is located at 26.17°N 91.57°E. It has an average elevation of 35 m (115 ft).

== Demographics ==
As of 2001 India census, Sualkuchi had a population of 14,129. Males constitute 50% of the population and females 50%. Sualkuchi has an average literacy rate of 82%, higher than the national average of 59.5%: male literacy is 88%, and female literacy is 76%. In Sualkuchi, 6% of the population is under 6 years of age.
