= Riha (garment) =

Assamese garment

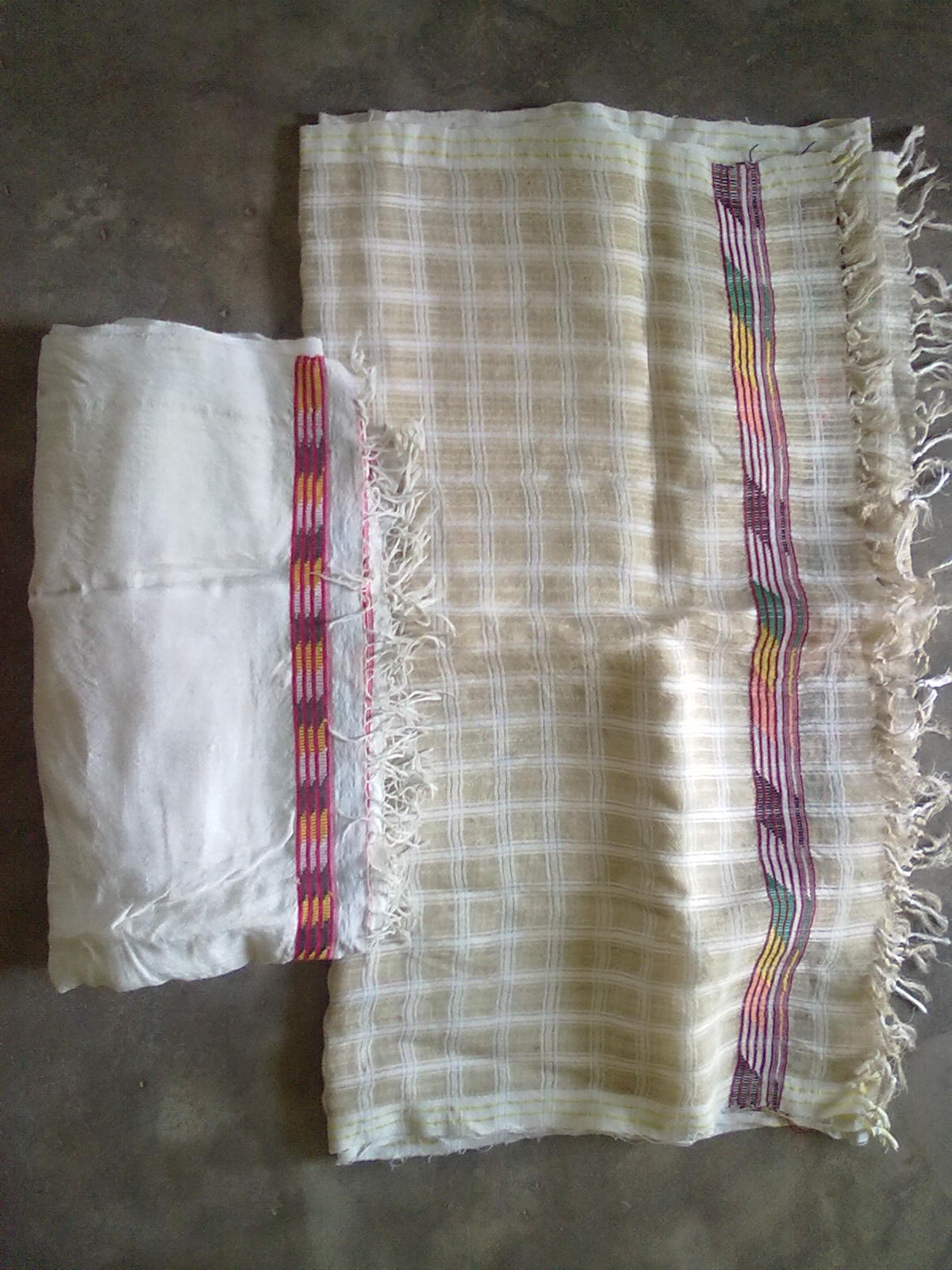
Riha as part of Mekhela Chador Assamese traditional women's dress

Riha (Assamese) or risa (Tripuri) is part of a three piece traditional garment worn with the Mekhela chador. It forms a part of the bridal trousseau for most Assamese brides these days. Riha, mekhela sador and traditional silk wearing are of Boro origin. In Tripura, a risa is worn by women in combination with a rignai.

== See also ==
- Mekhela chador
- Textiles and dresses of Assam
- Tripuri dress
