= Pat silk =

Silk from the cocoons of domesticated Bombyx mori from Assam, India

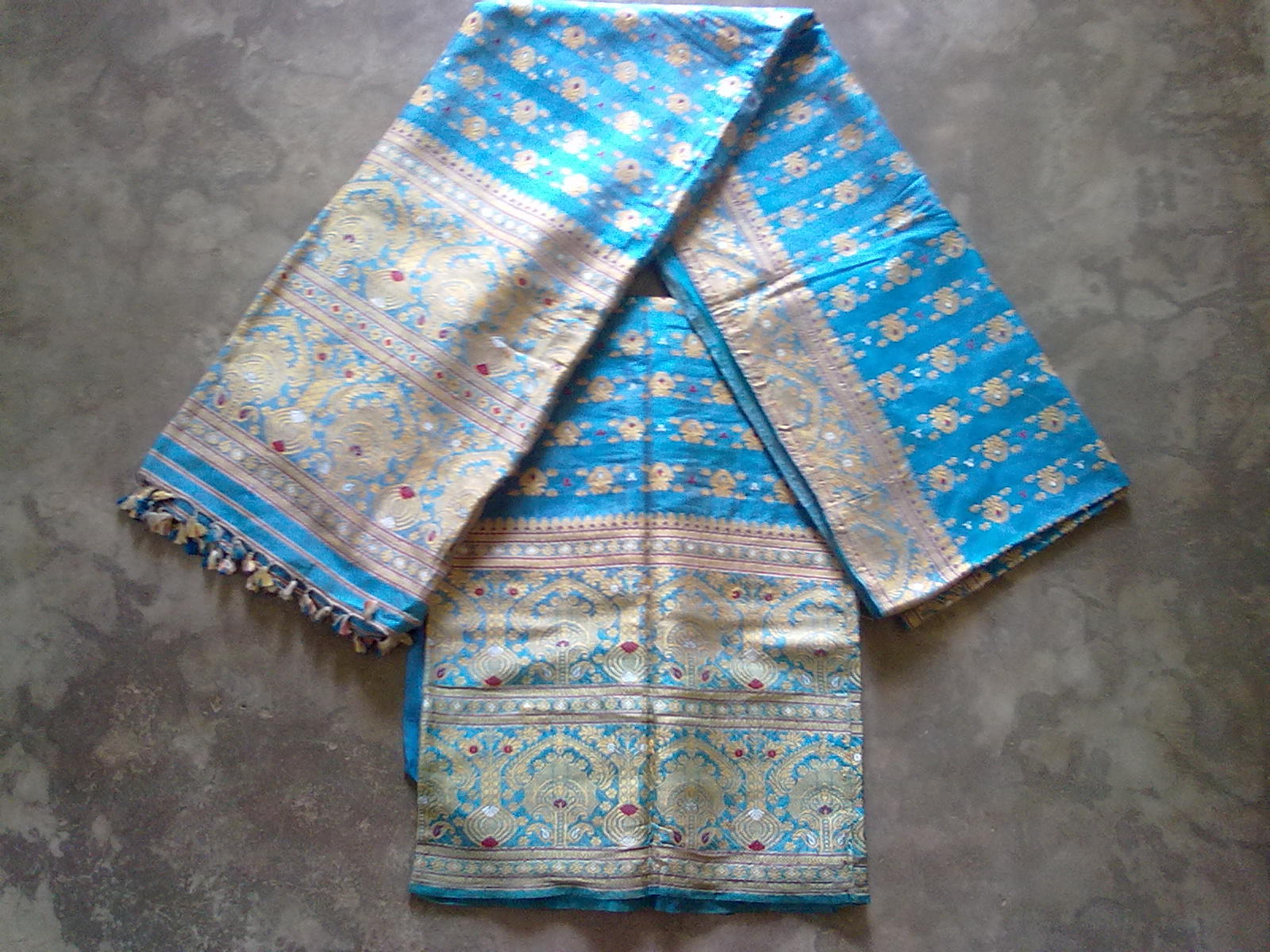
A set of Mekhela-Chadar made with Pat silk.

Pat silk or White pat silk, Mulberry silk of Assam (Assamese: পাট ৰেচম) is a variety of domestic silk in Assam, India. It is usually brilliant white or off-white in colour. Its cloth can dry in shadow. The larvae of the Pat Silkworm's preferred food is nuni (white Mulberry plant: Morus alba) leaves. The silk has a natural white tint and is known for its durability and glossy texture. Pat silk, like other Assam silks, is used in products like mekhelas, chadars and other textiles.

Domestic silk moths are closely dependent on humans for reproduction, as a result of millennia of selective breeding. Wild silk moths are different (having not been selectively bred) from their domestic cousins; they are not commercially viable in the production of silk.

In India, the major mulberry silk producing regions are Karnataka, Andhra Pradesh, West Bengal, Tamil Nadu and Jammu and Kashmir which together accounts for 92% of country's total mulberry raw silk production. Karnataka produces 9,000 metric tons of mulberry silk of a total of 14,000 metric tons produced in the country, thus contributing to nearly 70% of the country's total mulberry silk. In Karnataka, silk is mainly grown in the Mysore district. The mulberry silk produced in Karnataka is called Mysore silk and Pat silk is the mulberry silk produced in Assam.

Sericulture in Assam is an ancient industry which was brought by the Tibeto-Burman Kachari tribes.
