= Rignai =

Traditional Tripuri dress

Rignai Traditional Tripuri dress
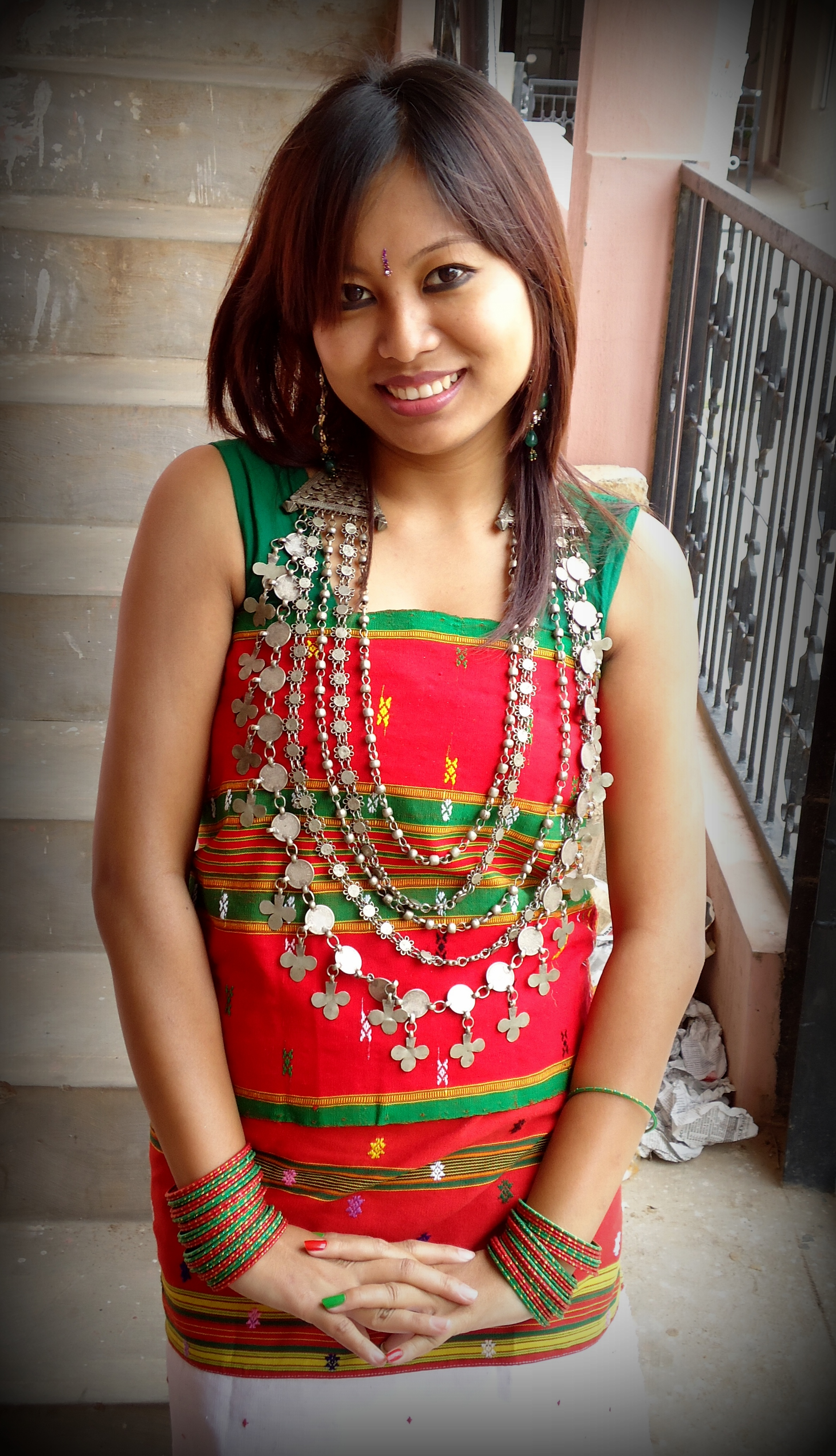
- A young Tripuri woman wearing rignai and risa

The rignai or rignwai is a traditional wrap-around dress worn by Tripuri women, predominantly in the state of Tripura. It is worn by wrapping it around the waist. It is worn in combination with a risa, which is a piece of cloth wrapped around the bust. It is worn by Tripuri women at home, in workplaces, and on particular occasions.

== Types & variations ==
The most significant rignai is called the "Chamathwi bar" and comprises white cloth bordered by maroon or other colors. The "Chamathwi bar" is worn during important occasions like wedding ceremonies and festivals like Goria Puja and Hangrai.

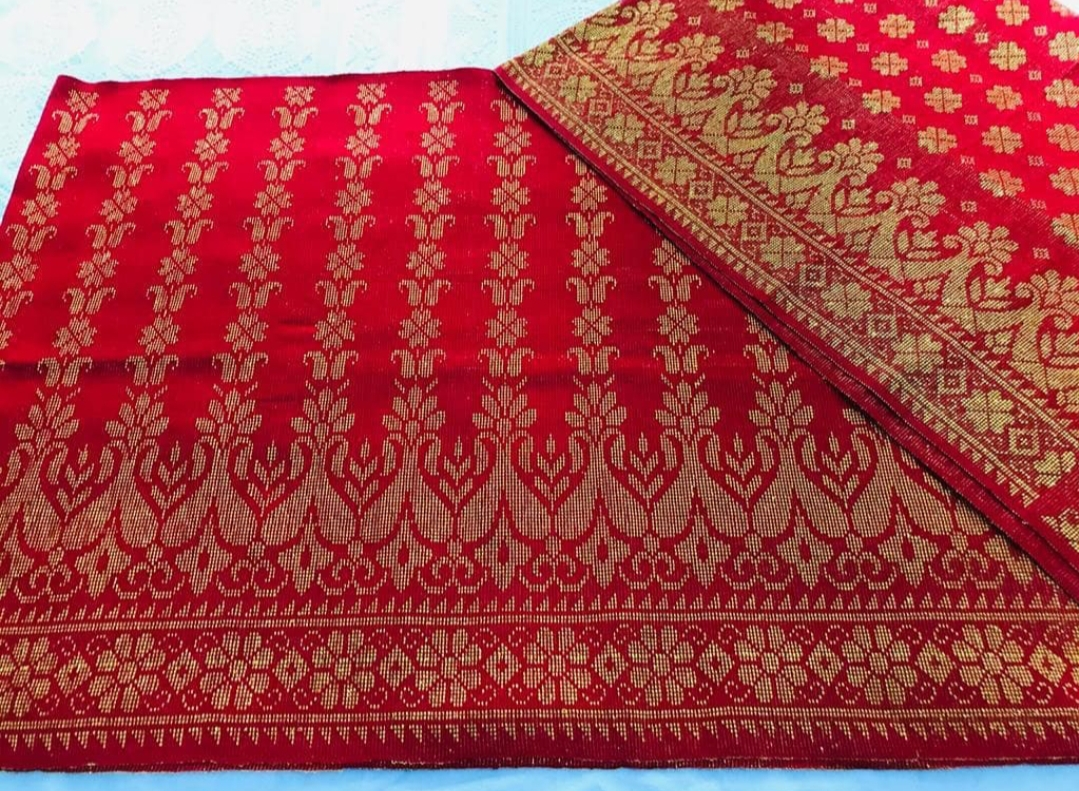
Rignai

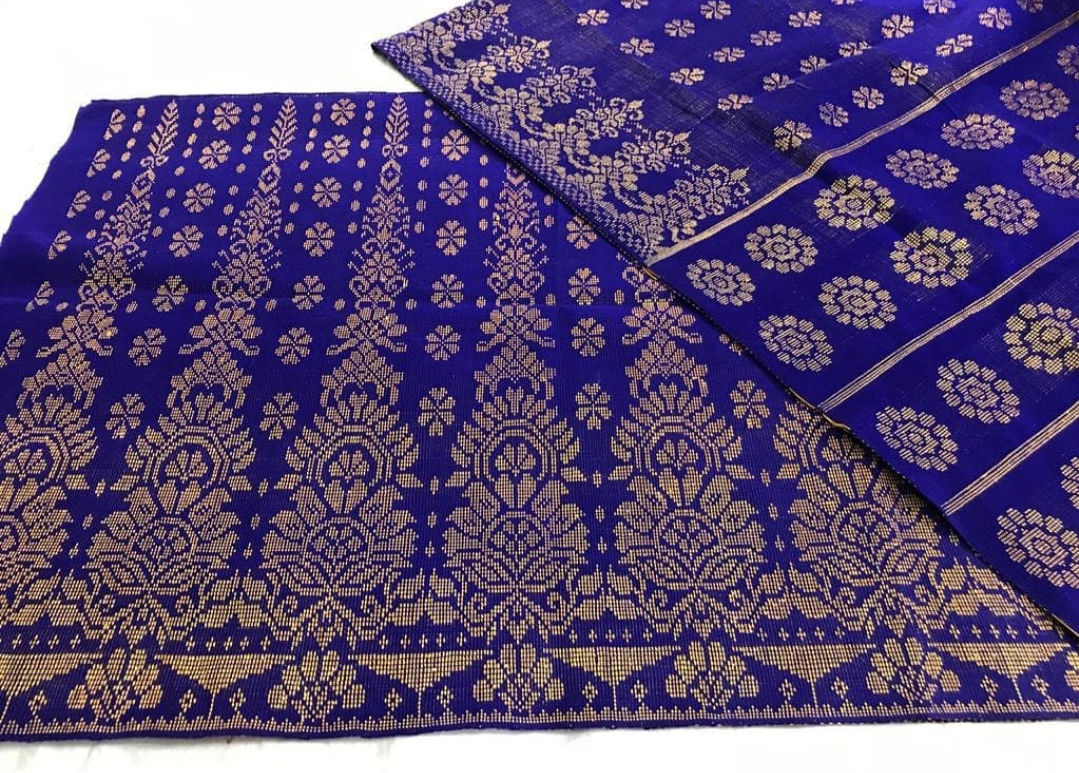
Rignai

Risa worn by the Debbarmas

Risa worn by the Debbarmas

== See also ==
- Tripuri people
- Tripuri Dances
- Tripuri dress
- Tripuri culture
