= Tripuri culture =

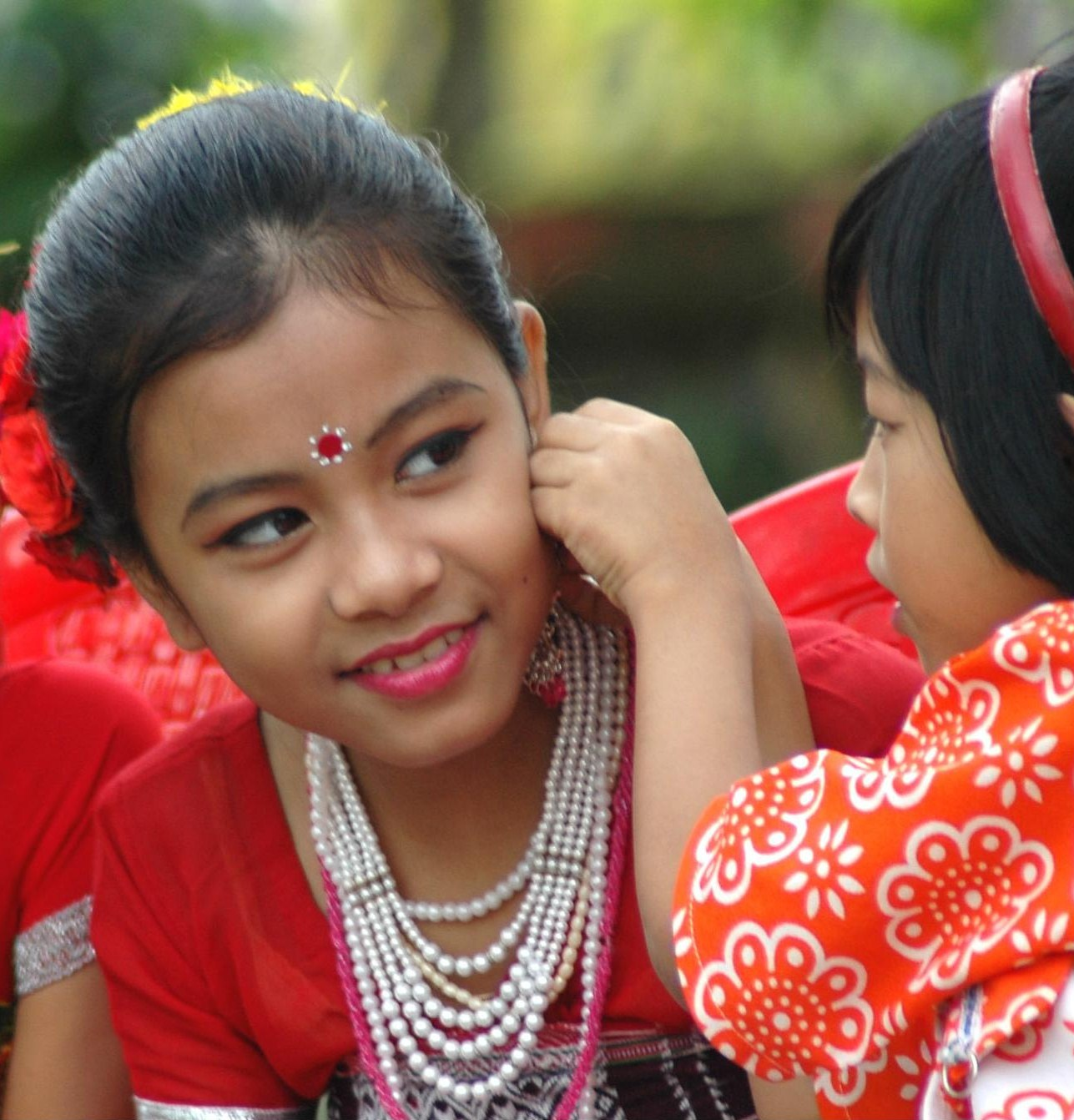
Children in Tripura prepare for a traditional dance.

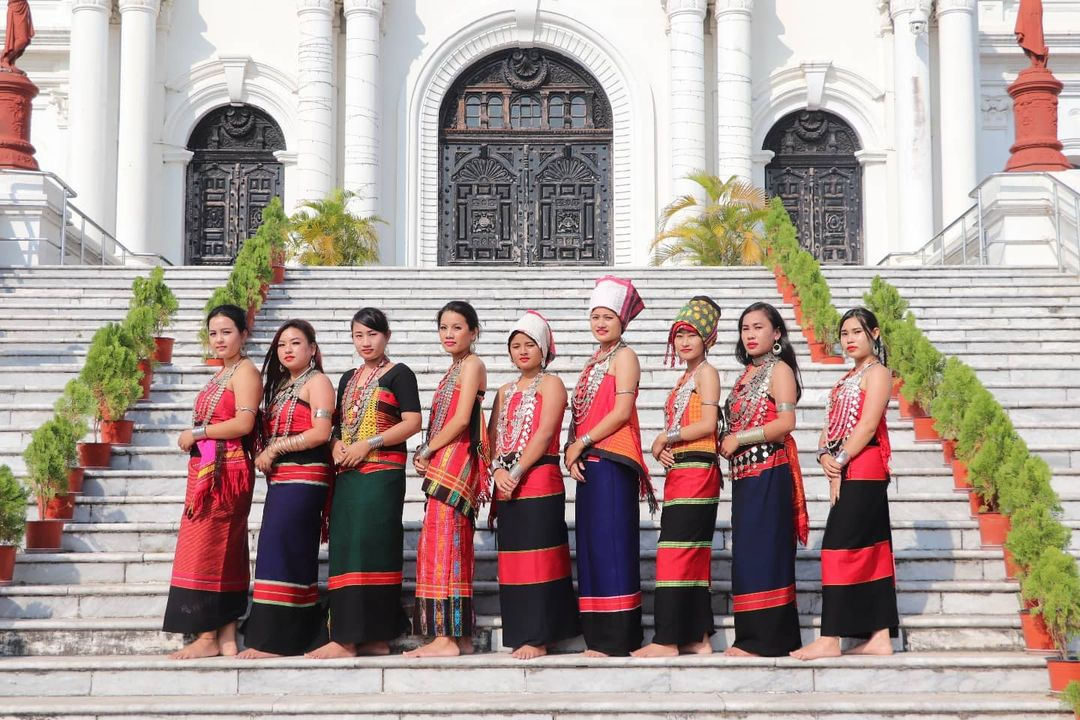
Tripura girls in their traditional attire

The Tripuri culture of North-East India and parts of Bangladesh has many distinctive features.

== Rules ==
The rules followed by the Tripuris are:

1. Lineage
2. Property ownership
3. Right to property in early era
4. Right to property in the present day
5. Marriage system as a whole
6. Traditional dress
7. Prohibition in pregnancy
8. Birth rituals
9. Abul suhmani
10. Death rituals
11. Purification bath

== Lineage ==
The lineage in Tripuri is called sandai or bosong.

Most Tripuri groups or sub-groups are named after an animal or bird. All the sub-groups of Tripuri lineage are patriarchal. Because the members of a lineage are related, their behavior pattern is also similar to a certain extent. The adopted son bears the lineage identity of the foster parents. The unmarried daughters belong to the lineage of their fathers or brothers. After marriage the daughter follows her husband's lineage.

== Property ownership ==
The property of the Tripuris may be classified under two headings:

1. Ancestral property which is inherited from ancestors
2. The property acquired by a person during his lifetime

Movable and immovable properties are to be included in the first category. Movable property includes ploughs and other agricultural implements, domestic animals, domestic articles, ornaments, clothing, utensils, cash money.

== Right of property in early era ==
The right of inheritance among the Tripuris is from the father to sons.

The eldest son generally gets the major share of the inheritance. The other sons and daughters also have the right of a share of the father's property. The head of the family gives a particular share to his wife. If the wife of the deceased stays with one of her sons, he who looks after his mother will inherit her property. The married or unmarried daughters or sisters of a person are only entitled to receive property if the father or brothers desire so.

== Right to property in the present day ==
In the present day, after the death of a man his son or sons get two-thirds share of the father's property. The remaining third is shared equally between the mother and her daughters. If the wife of a deceased lives with one of the sons or daughters, that son or daughter is entitled to inherit this property after the death of the mother. If any property is registered with the mother, then the daughters are the legal successors to their mother's property.

The father generally divides his property during his lifetime, but it is divided during the latter part of his life. Occasionally, the father is forced to divide the property to avoid a disturbance created by the adult sons. When a father marries a second time, he divides his property earlier on so as to avoid quarrelling among the sons of two wives. A share he will keep for himself to put aside for unmarried daughters and minor sons. The adopted son of a childless person has the right to inherit the property of his foster father.

If a person dies without issue his widow is entitled to inherit her deceased husband's property.

== Marriage as a whole ==
The Tripuri marriage follows some steps and beliefs.

=== Hamjwk Tubui Kaimani ===
In this system of marriage, the negotiation between two families is made by a marriage broker. He is known as the raibai or andra in the Reang dialect. In finalizing a marriage, the parents or the guardians play the sole role. The bride or the groom has no choice. This type of marriage always take place in the house of the bridegroom.

If the girl is chosen by the parents of the boy, the guardian of the daughter demands dowry of money, ornaments etc. Among the Tripuris the bride does not bring any dowry to her father-in-law's house. The Tripuri society is free from the dowry system. There is a trend toward expectation of a dowry at present, however.

=== Koksurma ===
Koksurma is the preliminary proposal for marriage, coming from either side of the parties. Generally, the raibai performs the brokerage in the koksurma. If the proposal is accepted by both parties, then they fix a date for a final settlement called Kokswhngmung.

=== Kokswhngmung ===
Kokswhngmung is the finalization of marriage where both sides of the party commit to get their ward marriage. The guardian of both sides sits side by side in front of two pots of rice beer called bwtwk. A bell-metal plate containing some cotton, durba, copper coin, rice, soil etc. is put in front of them to perform the rituals of Dangdua, performed by each person three times. The would-be bride then comes before the assembled persons and bows before the elders. The dates and times, terms and conditions of the marriage, bearing of expenditure etc. are finalized in this kokswhnglaimung.

=== Khum Phunukmung ===
After the finalization of the marriage there are rituals of invitation by offering betel leaf, nut and flower etc. to every family of the village. It is started from the house of the Chokdori, the village head. On the fixed date the bride is brought into the groom's house and received with much enthusiasm, and dangdua.

=== Aya and Ayajwk ===
Aya is the helper and assistant of the groom, in dressing, makeup, and procedural follow-up. Ayajwk is the counterpart for the bride. Throughout the marriage ceremony they are to remain near by the respective person.

=== Bedi ===
A bedi is a platform on which the marriage ceremony is performed. It is made of bamboo, cane, or wood. Over the bedi seven layers of plain pieces of cloth are tied one over the other like a tent. Jari is a pot made of brass, somewhat like a kettle but elongated, that is used in carrying the secret water to be sprinkled over the bridegroom, first by the priest then by the parents and other elders. The morning rituals are performed by Ochai the priest. The ritual is called lampra uathop. A deity is worshipped along with the Twisangrongma. After the ceremony the new couple bow down before and touch the feet of each senior person in attendance, and the aged person blesses the couple with gifts called heli. Following this ceremony on the same day a grand marriage feast is served to all.

The next day of the marriage is called dolan, when a post-marriage ceremony is observed by the close relatives of both parties. The non-vegetarian dish that is served on this occasion is an important part of Tripuri marriage ceremonies.

=== Maitwrang beraimani ===
Maitwrang beraimani is the first visit after the marriage to the bride's parents. It generally occurs after three days of marriage.

== Different kinds of marriages ==
=== Nok kaisa Kaimung: marriage by exchange ===
Sometimes marriage is arranged between two families by exchanging a boy and a girl and thus avoiding the payment of bride-price. The rituals and procedure remain almost the same.

=== Kharlai Kaijakmani: marriage by elopement ===
If a couple do not get the approval of respective parents for their desired marriage, they may decide to elope. The boy generally takes the initiative and runs away from home. The marriage ceremony would be conducted in a supportive relative's home by performing the wathop worship.

=== Phuisai Tubuma: marriage by purchase ===
In this form of marriage, the bridegroom or his parents pay a sum of money in cash to the bride's family as her price. Subsequently, the bride's parents have less said in the marriage ceremonies than the groom's parents.

=== Koklam Kwrwi Kaimung: marriage by capture ===
This form of marriage is not very common with Tripuris. No wedding rituals are maintained except the uathop worship.

=== Hamjaklai Kaijakmani: marriage by love ===
This form of marriage is very common among the Tripuris and is becoming increasingly more popular. When a boy and girl fall in love, they bring their desire to marry to the notice of their respective parents and obtain consent, then the parents arrange the marriage. All the rituals of the wedding are observed.

=== Sikla sogya kaimani: child marriage ===
This type of marriage among the Tripuri was practiced in the past. It is becoming rare and found in remote villages only.

=== Chamari omor: marriage by service ===
This type of marriage was prevalent in Tripuri society. In this form of marriage, the groom leaves his house and goes to live in his would-be father-in-law's house. He and his bride remain there for a lifetime. All the usual wedding procedures are followed.

=== Chamari ompa ===
This form of marriage is identical with the marriage of chamari omor, the only difference being that the bridegroom is obliged to serve the parent-in-law's house for a certain period of time, generally two or three years. All other rituals remain the same.

=== Sundul phulmani: widow remarriage ===
Widow remarriage is commonly practiced in Tripuri society. A widow, widower, divorced person, or deserted woman is allowed to remarry. This type of marriage is also settled by the raibai. The guardians of each party settle the marriage in the presence of the raibai and arrange the date. The worship of the uathop is done by the ochai. The arrangements for the ceremony are low-profile.

== Kaklaimani: divorce ==
Divorce is known as kaklaimani in Kokborok.

Divorce is permissible in Tripuri society. Husbands and wives are allowed to seek divorce on several grounds. Parents of the parties, the village head, and elders gather at a meeting. The parties are given a chance to express their grievances and are heard patiently. After hearing the facts, circumstances, and opinion of either side, the village head man, Chokdiri, gives the judgment in front of the gathering; it is bound on both parties.

== Traditional dress ==
A pattern of rigwnai worn by the Debbarmas.

Tripuris have their own traditional dress, similar in style to that of other North-East Indian peoples. It is, however, different in pattern and design. The clothing for the lower half of the body is called rignai in Tripuri and for the upper half of the body the clothing has two parts, the risa and rikutu.

The risa covers the chest area and the rikutu covers the whole of the upper half of the body. Formerly, these garments were woven by women using home-spun cotton thread. Nowadays, the threads are bought from the market and the risa is not worn; instead, a blouse is worn by most Tripuri women. Girls wear rignai with tops, too.

Each Tripuri clan has its own rignai pattern and design. The patterns of the rignai are so distinct that the clan of a Tripuri woman can be identified by the pattern of her rignai. However, there is intermingling of the rignai: Clans wear the rignai of other clans freely and new designs are being woven.

The rikutu is plain cloth of a different colour and shade than the other items of clothing. Today, the rikutu is woven by Tripuri women.

Some fashion types that are woven in the rignai borok by Tripuri women are as follows:

- Anji
- Banarosi
- Chamthwibar
- Jirabi
- Khamjang
- Khumbar
- Kuaiphang
- Kuaichu
- Kuaichu bokobom
- Kuaichu ulta
- Malibar
- Miyong
- Muikhunchok
- Monaisora
- Muisili
- Natupalia
- Phantokbar
- Sada
- Salu
- Similik yapai
- Takhumtei
- Temanlia
- Thaimaikrang
- Thaiphlokbar
- Tokbakbar
- Tokha
- Toksa
- Toiling
- Toprengsakhitung
- Rignaichamwthwi
- Rignai mereng
- Metereng trang
- Rignai khamchwi
- Kwsakwpra
- Rignaibru
- Rignaikosong
- Kwsapra
- Songkai
- Sorbangi

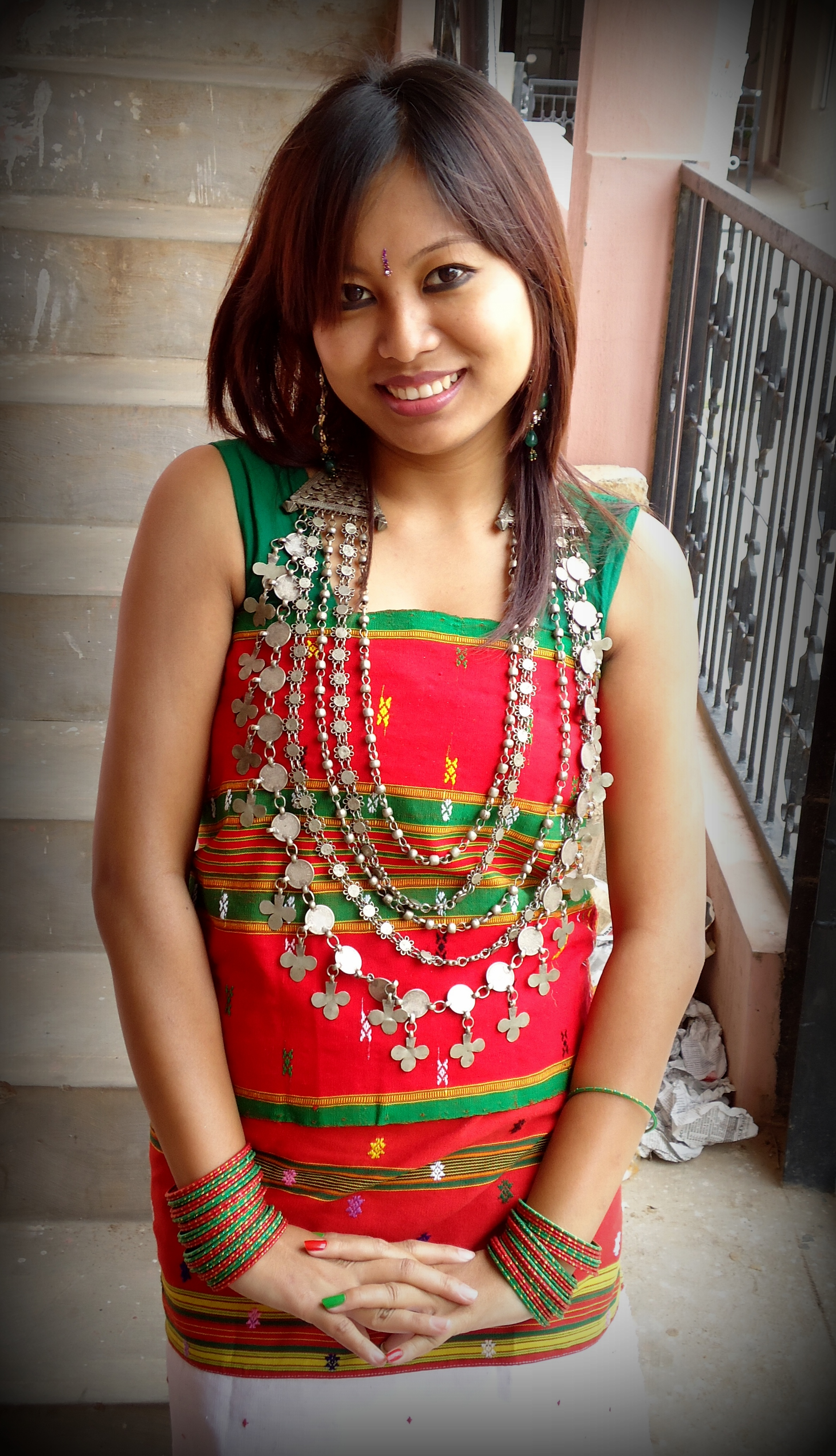
A young Tripuri woman wearing rigwnai and risa

It is said that at the time of Subrai Raja, the most famous and legendary King of Tripura, through his 250 wives he had invented 250 designs of rignai. He married those women who invented a new design. But all these designs have been lost over time and only a few remain. An effort to rediscover the lost designs is in process.

The male counterpart for the loin area is rikutu and for the upper part of the body is the kamchwlwi borok. Today, however, very few men wear this style of dress except in rural Tripura and by the working class. Males have adopted more modern dress.

== Probihitions during pregnancy ==
Generally, from the fifth month of pregnancy a woman does not cohabit with her husband. Restriction on various food is prevalent. Mrigel fish is to be avoided and any twin fruits or vegetables such as banana, mango, or cucumber; any fruits or vegetables which are attached to each other by default are not to be eaten by a pregnant woman. Tripuris consider that the eating of such twin fruits will cause twin pregnancy.

A pregnant woman is to refrain from hard work and lifting of heavy objects for the well-being of both baby and mother. On the day of the birth no special rites are performed. Kumajwk, the traditional birth assistant, chooses a nickname for the newborn baby.

The period of unholiness among the Tripuri is fixed for eight days. During the period of unholiness the mother is forbidden to do any household work. The whole family is prohibited from joining any worship or any religious ceremony during this period. The diet prescribed during this period is cooked rice with two types of curry chicken and fish soup and any bitter curry.

== Birth rituals ==
Pregnancy is considered to have taken place when menstruation stops in a married woman.

A Tripuri woman generally counts the months of her pregnancy from the date when the monthly period stops.

== Abul suhmani ==
Abul suhmani is the purification ceremony after the birth of the baby and is held nine days after the delivery. The ha kahrima and sal phunukma are, respectively, the touching of the ground and seeing the sun by the newborn baby. The ochai (priest) performs the ceremony; a wathop is worshiped at the ceremony. Generally, a feast is served to all the villagers and invited guests.

Mung pharma is a name-giving ceremony that is a part of abul suhmani. Several names are written down and a lamp (dia/deepak) burns alongside each name. The name associated with the lamp that burns the longest is selected for the child.

== Death rituals ==
The Tripuri practice for disposal of a dead body is by cremation except for that of a newborn or for a cholera death in earlier days. When a death occurs in a Tripuri family the relatives are first informed by the members of the deceased family. The cremation is deferred until most of the mourners arrive. First the dead body is bathed with hot water and dressed in new or clean clothes. The body faces north. Mustard oil and tulsi leaves are put on the eyes of the dead body. The relatives who come to pay homage to the dead person place paddy, cotton, and flowers at the feet of the body. Some persons place coins, according to their means, on the chest of the body, with the left hand. A cock is killed at the feet of the corpse. Cooked chicken and rice in a newly made bamboo basket is offered up to the body.

The funeral procession proceeds towards the cremation ground, generally at the bank of river or stream. The adult sons have the right over anyone else to lift the body. The sons-in-law and nephews lift the bier upon their shoulders uttering "Hari hari bol" three times. Women are also allowed to attend the cremation. A person carries the basket containing paddy, cotton, sesame and used chopper (damra). He sprinkles it onto the road ahead of the procession.

Firewood is arranged one over another and the body is placed onto the pyre with the head facing north. More firewood is placed over the body.

The eldest son reserves the right of touching the fire to the mouth of the dead body; this is called hortanlaio. He takes a bamboo stick, the top of which is wrapped with a piece of cloth, dips it in oil and lights it. He moves three to seven times around the dead body, with the fiery stick in his left hand and carrying water in an earthen pitcher in his right hand. After encircling once he touches the mouth of the deceased with the burning end of the bamboo stick. Thereafter all persons attending the cremation place the fire to the dead body turn by turn.with left hand. After placing the fire people who placed fire make knot of the ground grasses in believe that the departed soul will not be able to follow them by making the way knotted with grasses.

== Purification bath ==
The participants go to the deceased's house after taking a purification bath in a nearby source of water. When the cremation participants return home, they are sprinkled with secret Ganges water by using a Tulsi leaf on their head and touch fire.

The people are not allowed to eat rice other than soaked grain and rice flakes with sugar until the evening star is observed in the sky. The mourning period is seven days for the male descendants and unmarried daughters and three days for married daughters of the deceased. But by the influence of the Brahmin, a thirteen-day shraddha is observed in recent times by the male descendant and male lineage. The maikhlai rimani ceremony or shraddho is observed at the end of the mourning period by the offering of food and drink to the departed soul. Villagers are also invited to take part in this ceremony and to feast with the mourning family. This ceremony used to be performed by the ochai.

The ash or the piece of bone of the forehead is kept in a small, newly constructed hut (osthi nok) for the purpose and worshiped until the first Hangrai the Sankranti, after the death. The remains are submerged in Dumbur (the waterfall at Gumti river, in Tripura) or in the Ganges river at Sagardeep or any holy place of the Hindus according to means. For next 13 days the relatives of deceased person can't go/touch family shrines, temples, and can't perform any religious holy rituals. They need to follow vegetarian food until maikhlai rima / offering to the deceased person is performed.
