= Assam silk =

Any of several types of wild silk native to Assam, India

Assam silk denotes the three major types of indigenous wild silks produced in Assam—golden muga, white pat and warm eri silk. The Assam silk industry, now centered in Sualkuchi, is a labor-intensive industry.

== History ==
Assam was well known for the production of high quality silk since ancient times. The craft of weaving goes along with the production of silk. It grew to such sophistication in Assam that it was known all over India and abroad. In the Kishkindha Kanda of Ramayana, it is stated that one travelling towards the east has to first pass through Magadha, Anga, Pundra and then the Kosha-karanam-bhumi ("the country of cocoon rearers").

Kautilya's Arthashastra, a political literature of the 3rd century BC, makes references to the highly sophisticated silk clothing from Assam. Kautilya mentions the production of Suvarnakudyaka (from Kamrupa) along with Vangika (from Vanga/southern Bengal), Magadhika (from Magadha) and Paundrika (from Pundra/northern Bengal), of which Suvarnakudyaka, Magadhika and Paundrika fabrics were types of Kauseya (Tussar/Muga) and Cina-patta (Mulberry silk). The fact that Kamrupa produced Suvarnakudyaka is confirmed by the 8th-century writer Kumārila Bhaṭṭa who, in his commentary of Arthashatra, said that Kamrupa was Suvarnakudya (Kamarupeschaiva Suvarna Kudyah), which scholars believe were peoduced by indigineous tribal people of the land. As per the Arthashastra, the fibres of Suvarnakudyaka were of 'the colour of butter', 'as red as the sun', and of the best quality. Due to this description of colour, the type of silk can be easily identified as Muga. The text also refers to four trees (Vakula, Likucha, Vata and Naga-vriksa) which the silkworms feed on. Out of these, Vakula and Naga-vriksa belong to the genus Ericales and Magnolia which the Muga silkworm Antheraea assamensis is known to feed on; while Likucha (Artocarpus lakucha) and Vata belong to the genus Moraceae (Mulberry) which the Pat Silkworm feeds on. This is further confirmed from the 9th century thesaurus Amara-kosha which mentions that the worms of the fibre Patrorna (a form of white silk), fed on the leaves of Vata, Lakucha, etc. The Arthashastra also states that the fibre was spun while the threads were wet, indicating that the production method was still the same at that period.

The ancient text Kalika Purana (dated between 10th-11th century) well records the use of silk in the worship of deities in ancient Kamrupa. As per the text, while worshipping the deities at the Dikkarvasini pitha (also known as Tamreswari of Sadiya), red, yellow and white Kauseya(meaning wild silk, probably Muga) were used to drape the idols of the presiding deities of the temple. It is known that Muga, in olden times, was available in yellow (natural), white (Mejankari muga) and often dyed red with lac.

The knowledge of sericulture probably arrived with the Tibeto-Burman groups which arrived from China around the period of 3000-2000 BC. There was trade of silk through the Southwestern Silk Road, which started from China, passed through Burma and Assam, and finally connected to the main Silk Road in Turkmenistan. Ram Mohan Nath in his book The Background of Assamese Culture states that it would be "clear that in ancient times traders from different parts of Tibet, Central Asia and China flocked to Assam through various routes, and as they traded mostly in silk, they were generally called Seres – Cirrahadoi – Syrities – Cirata – Kirata. The word Kirata, therefore, is a general term referring to the people of the Mongoloid origin, and it refers especially to the Bodos." These Bodos referred by Nath are today known as Kacharis which includes groups such as Boros, Deori, Dimasas, Chutias, Rabhas, Sonowal, Garo and Koch. J. Geoghegan in his book Silk in India states that: "Whatever may be the date of the introduction of the worm, its geographical distribution at present day, and the fact species first introduced was a multivoltine, seem to me to lead to the conclusion that the insect was first introduced into India from the north-east."

There are various other records to show that silk came to India through Assam. As per the Sanskrit text Harshacharita (biography of North Indian ruler Harshavardhan written by the court poet Banabhatta in the 7th century), during the coronation ceremony of King Harshavardhan, King Bhaskarvarman of Kamrupa gifted many precious items to the North Indian king. Out of these, the most important ones include the precious fabrics and jewels. These included an umbrella wrapped by a dukula cloth, sacks of patta-sutra cloth as well as ksoma fabrics which were as pure as the autumn moon's light (sharada chandrama shaucha ksamani). These fabrics could either be silk or linen. It is also mentioned in the text that the loin fibres were so even and polished that they resembled Bhoj-patra, which could indicate silk as well. There are also references to Assam silk in the records written by Huen Sang where he has written the use and trade of silk in Kamrupa during the rule of King Bhaskar Varman.

Genetic research on silkworms shows that Assam silk originated in two specific regions of Assam. One was the Garo Hills in the ancient Kamrupa kingdom, and the other was Dhakuakhana in the ancient Chutia kingdom.

== Types of Assam silk ==
=== Muga silk ===
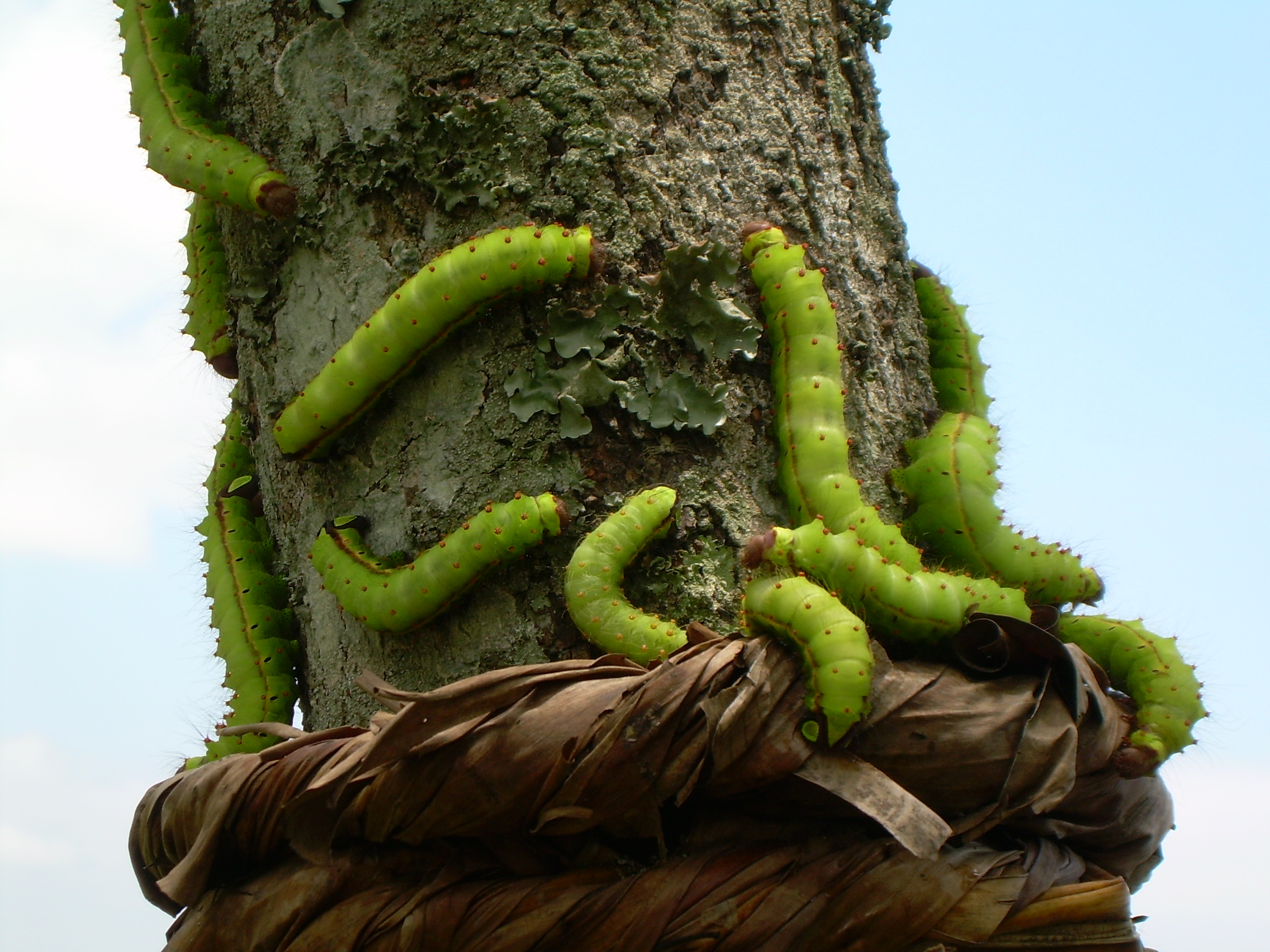
Muga silkworms on a som tree

Muga silk is the product of the silkworm Antheraea assamensis endemic to Assam. The larvae of these moths feed on som (Machilus bombycina) and sualu (Litsaea polyantha) leaves. The silk produced is known for its glossy, fine texture and durability. It was previously reported that muga silk cannot be dyed or bleached due to "low porosity", but this is incorrect; muga takes dye like any other silk. This silk can be hand washed with its lustre increasing after every wash. Very often the silk outlives its owner.

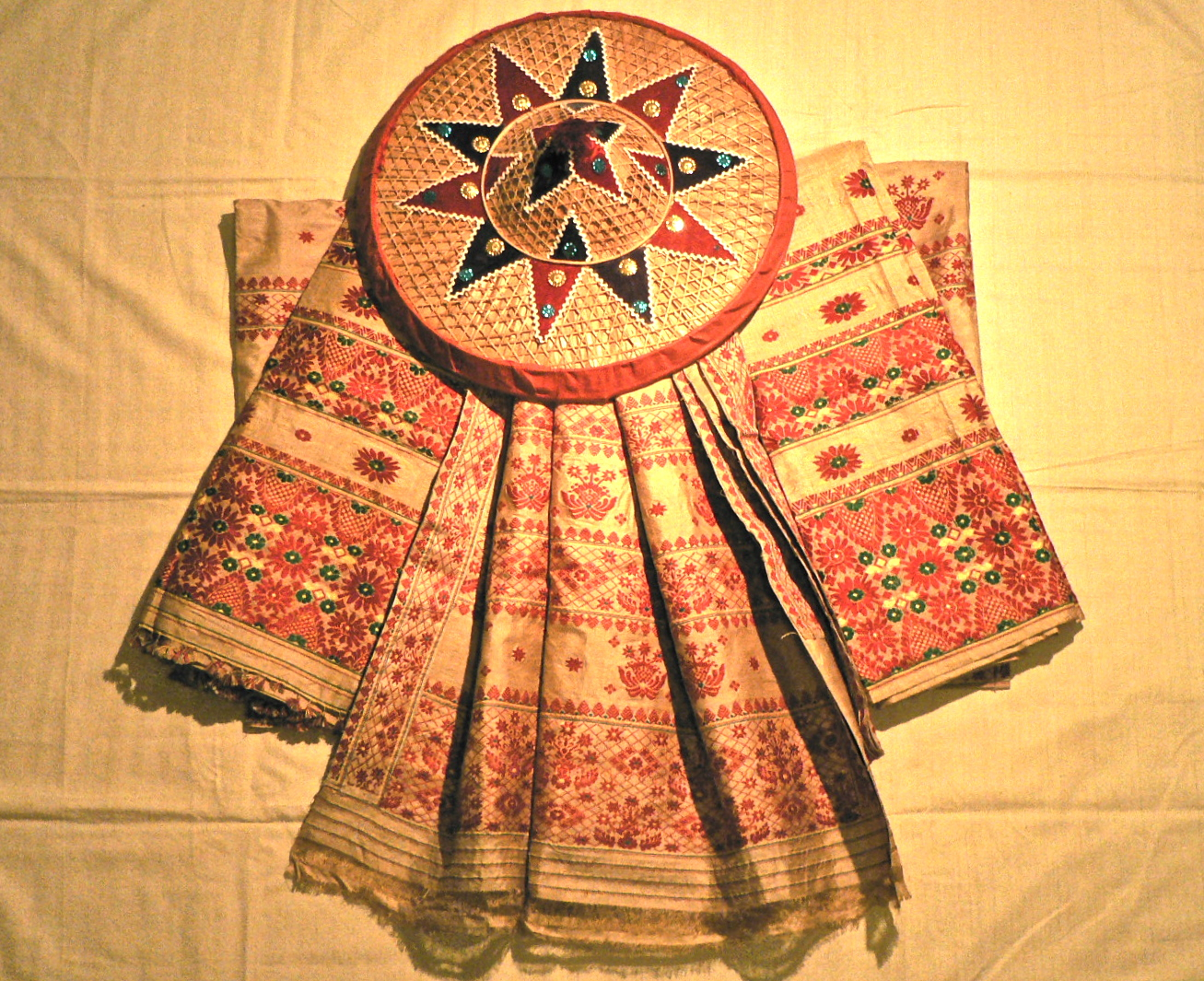
A set of mekhela chadors made with muga silk from Assam arranged around a jaapi and set on a shawl made with eri silk.

In 2015, Adarsh Gupta K of Nagaraju's research team at Centre for DNA Fingerprinting and Diagnostics, Hyderabad, India, discovered the complete sequence and the protein structure of muga silk fibroin and published it in Nature Scientific Reports

Muga silk has been given the Geographical Indication (GI) status since 2007 and the logo for authentic production has been registered with Assam Science Technology and Environment Council. The Central Silk Board of India has the authority to inspect Muga silk products, certify their authenticity and allow traders to use the GI logo.

=== White pat silk ===
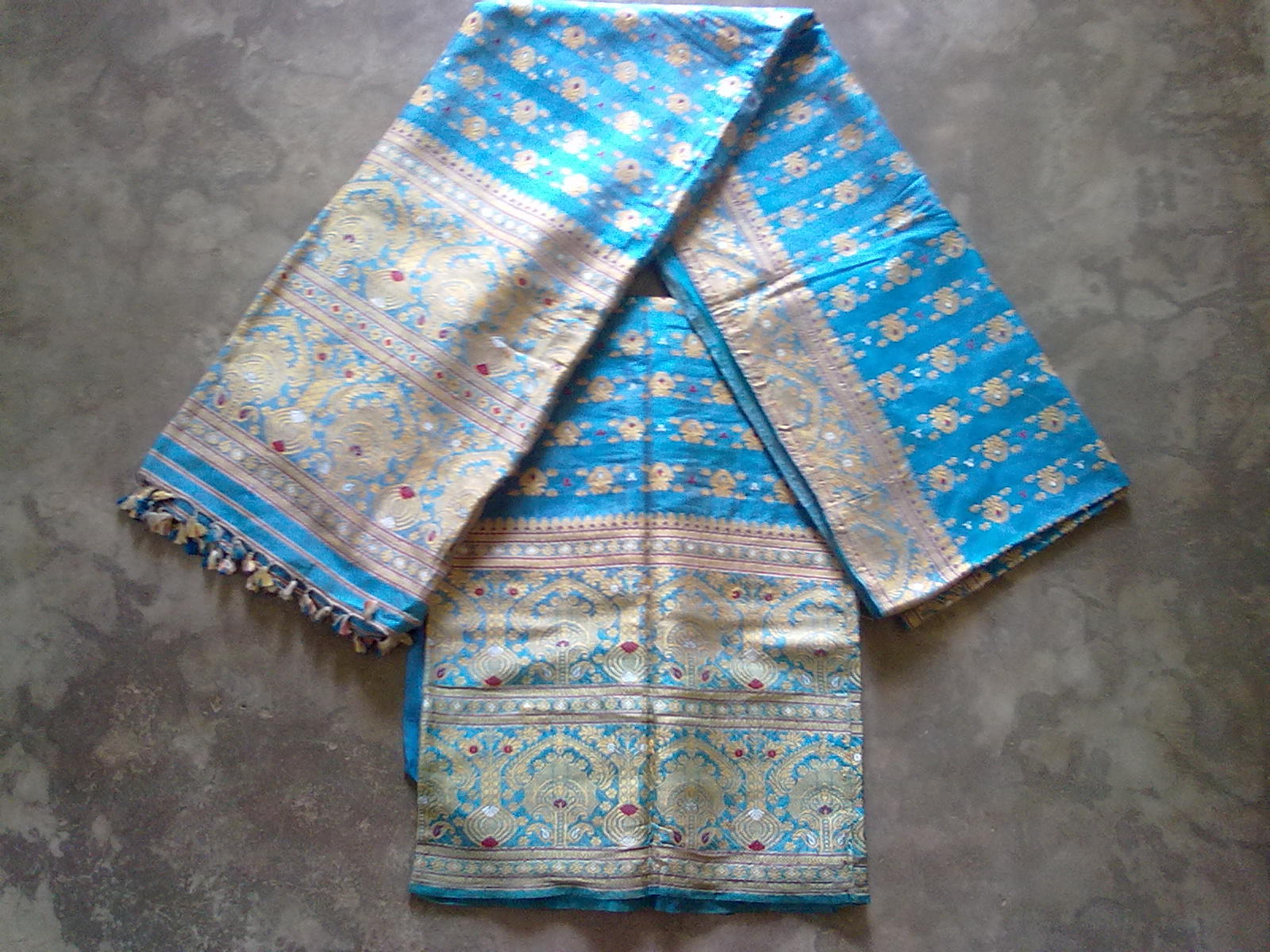
A set of mekhela-chadar made with pat silk.

Pat silk is produced by Bombyx textor silkworms which feed on mulberry (Morus spp.) leaves. It is usually brilliant white or off-white in colour. Its cloth can dry in shadow.

=== Eri silk ===
Eri silk is made by Samia cynthia ricini which feed on leaves of castor oil plant (Ricinus communis). It is also known as endi or errandi silk. Because manufacturing process of eri allows the pupae to develop into adults and only the open ended cocoons are used for turning into silk, it is also popularly known as non-violent silk. This silk is soft and warm and is popular as shawls and quilts.

== The silk industry of Sualkuchi ==
Sualkuchi is a multi-caste town of Kamrup (rural) district of Assam, situated on the north bank of the mighty Brahmaputra at a distance of 30 km west of Guwahati.

Many people in Sualkuchi are weavers. Almost every household has a hand-loom to manufacture traditional Assamese silk.

As per the Census report of 2001, the workforce participation rate in the town was 37.93% of the total populations, of which only 0.53% were cultivators, 1.2% were agricultural labours, 56.37% were engaged in household industries and the remaining 41.90% were engaged in other activities.

There are several lakh throw and fly-shuttle handlooms in Assam, but most of them are domestic weaving a few metres of cloth for the use by the family members. There are also some semi commercial looms producing some metres of fabrics for the market during the off hours of the house-wives. These semi-commercial weavers work either independently or under some so called "Mahajans". Mahajans supply yarn to the poor weavers, who return the woven cloth against wages per piece.

=== History ===
Although silk was cultivated and woven by women all around Assam, the silk clothes of a particular place named Sualkuchi achieved much fame during the Kamarupa as well as Ahom rule.

Sualkuchi is said to have been established in the 11th Century by King Dharma Pala of the Pala dynasty that ruled western Assam from 900 AD to about 1100 AD. Dharma Pala, the story goes, brought 26 weaver families from Tantikuchi in Barpeta to Sualkuchi and created a weavers' village close to modern-day Guwahati. Silk was given royal patronage during that period and Sualkuchi was made an important centre of silk weaving.

The hand-loom industry of Sualkuchi creates cotton textiles, silk textiles, and Khadi cloth. These traditional textiles hold high social and moral value in and outside the state. However, Sualkuchi is best known for its silk textiles, both mulberry and muga silk. Muga, "the golden fibre", is produced only in Assam; it's become known as Assam silk from its association with the region. Such activities are intimately linked with the culture and tradition of the Assamese people since long past.

Having a long tradition of silk weaving at least since the 17th century, Sualkuchi is the centre of the silk hand-loom industry of Assam. Originally, Sualkuchi was a "craft village" having several cottage industries until the 1940s, such as hand-loom weaving, traditional oil processing, goldsmithing, and pottery. But since the 1940s, the industries other than hand-loom have almost become extinct, and the artisans have taken up silk weaving. Until 1930, the weaving industry of Sualkuchi remained almost confined within the Tanti community of Tantipara. Later, people belonging to other communities gradually took up silk weaving. Now, even the fishermen of the Koibortapara hamlet of Bamun-Sualkuchi and the Brahmin families have also given up their ascriptive caste occupations and have taken up silk weaving as their main source of income.

The weaving industry of Sualkuchi received a big boost during the Second World War. The growing demand for fabrics and their increasing prices encouraged a few Tanti families to begin weaving commercially. They started weaving factories engaging hired wage weavers. Today, 73.78% of the households in Sualkuchi work in the commercial weaving industry.

Although the hired wage weavers were originally the local poor from Bamun-Sualkuchi and Bhatipara, migrant weavers from different parts of Assam have become dominant in the industry since the 1980s. The census of hand-looms in Sualkuchi, conducted in 2002 reveals that Sualkuchi has 13,752 active commercial hand-looms, and 54.75% of these looms are operated by female weavers who are hired from towns outside of Sualkuchi.

While silk-rearing vanished long time ago, the gani industry perished during the early 20th century as the 'Mudois' of Sualkuchi.

In the 21st century, the local weavers and artisans of Sualkuchi began using digital platforms to promote their products globally.

== Cultural impact of Assam silk ==
Assam silk has been recognized by major Indian cultural figures, most notably Mahatma Gandhi and Narayan Chandra Das.

Gandhi visited Sualkuchi on January 9, 1946, to view an exhibition of eri and khadi clothes. Designer Rajen Dek wove an image of Gandhi into a piece of pat cloth, and the exhibition presented it to him. The woven picture was so fine that even the two broken front teeth of Gandhiji with a smiling face were depicted and while seeing the picture the father of the nation remarked that the weavers could weave dreams in their cloth.

"Khat khat khat khatsalare sabade prean mor nite nachuyai" was one of the most popular radio songs composed and sung during the 1950s by the present artist pensioner Narayan Chandra Das Of Sualkuchhi. Actually the 'click-clack click-clack' sound of the loom make the soul of the passerby dance with the rhythmic rattle of the shuttle flying through the sheds of the wrap.

== See also ==
- Kausheya (silk)
- Mekhela chador
- Mysore silk
- Ilkal saree
- Navalgund Durries
