= Indian trademark law =

Indian trademark law statutorily protects trademarks as per the Trademark Act, 1999 and also under the common law remedy of passing off. Statutory protection of trademark is administered by the Controller General of Patents, Designs and Trade Marks, a government agency that reports to the Department of Industrial Policy and Promotion (DIPP), under the Ministry of Commerce and Industry.

The law of trademark deals with the mechanism of registration, protection of trademark and prevention of fraudulent trademark. The law also provides for the rights acquired by registration of trademark, modes of transfer and assignment of the rights, nature of infringements, penalties for such infringement and remedies available to the owner in case of such infringement.

== History ==
The law of trademark in India before 1940 was based on the common law principles of passing off and equity, as were followed in England before the enactment of the first Registration Act, 1875. The first statutory law related to trademark in India was the Trade Marks Act, 1940 which had similar provision to the UK Trade Marks Act, 1938. In 1958, the Trade and Merchandise Marks Act, 1958 was enacted which consolidated the provisions related to trademarks contained in other statutes like, the Indian Penal Code, Criminal Procedure Code and the Sea Customs Act. The Trade and Merchandise Marks Act, 1958 was repealed by the Trade Marks Act, 1999 and is the current governing law related to registered trademarks. The 1999 Act was enacted to comply with the provisions of the TRIPS. Though some aspects of the unregistered trade marks have been enacted into the 1999 Act, but they are primarily governed by the common law rules based on the principles evolved out of the judgments of the Courts. Where the law is ambiguous, the principles evolved and interpretation made by the Courts in England have been applied in India taking into consideration the context of the legal procedure, laws and realities of India.

== Trademark ==
Trademark defined under Section 2 (1)(zb) of the Trade Marks Act, 1999 as, "trade mark means a mark capable of being represented graphically and which is capable of distinguishing the goods or services of one person from those of others and may include shape of goods, their packaging and combination of colours." A mark can include a device, brand, heading, label, ticket, name, signature, word, letter, numeral, shape of goods, packaging or combination of colors or any such combinations. The trademark prevents unauthorized use of an individual's or company's product or service without their permission.

== Trademark rules ==
With effect from 6 March 2017, the new trademark rules came into existence. The intention is to simplify the whole trademark registration process and make it hassle-free and quick. Some of the features of the new rules are sound marks are made registrable; 3D marks are made registrable; e-filing is promoted; provisions pertaining to the well-known mark; separate fees structure for an individual/startup/small enterprise and others; expedited processing of application; hearing via video conferencing; and the number of forms has been cut down to 8 from the existing around 75 forms.

== Trademark classes ==
Trademark law 2002, suggests that trademark can be registered in India under the following classes:

Class 1. Chemical used in industry, science, photography, agriculture, horticulture and forestry; unprocessed artificial resins, unprocessed plastics; manures; fire extinguishing compositions; tempering and soldering preparations; chemical substances for preserving foodstuffs; tanning substances; adhesive used in industry

Class 2 . Paints, varnishes, lacquers; preservatives against rust and against deterioration of wood; colorants; mordents; raw natural resins; metals in foil and powder form for painters; decorators; printers and artists

Class 3 . Bleaching preparations and other substances for laundry use; cleaning; polishing; scouring and abrasive preparations; soaps; perfumery, essential oils, cosmetics, hair lotions, dentifrices

Class 4 . Industrial oils and greases; lubricants; dust absorbing, wetting and binding compositions; fuels(including motor spirit) and illuminants; candles, wicks

Class 5 . Pharmaceutical, veterinary and sanitary preparations; dietetic substances adapted for medical use, food for babies; plasters, materials for dressings; materials for stopping teeth, dental wax; disinfectants; preparation for destroying vermin; fungicides, herbicides

Class 6. Common metals and their alloys; metal building materials;

transportable buildings of metal; materials of metal for railway tracks; non-electric cables and wires of common metal; ironmongery, small items of metal hardware; pipes and tubes of metal; safes; goods of common metal not included in other classes; ores

Class 7 . Machines and machine tools; motors and engines (except for land vehicles); machine coupling and transmission components (except for land vehicles); agricultural implements other than hand-operated; incubators for eggs

Class 8 . Hand tools and implements (hand-operated); cutlery; side arms; razors

Class 9 . Scientific, nautical, surveying, electric, photographic, cinematographic, optical, weighing, measuring, signalling, checking (supervision), life saving and teaching apparatus and instruments; apparatus for recording, transmission or reproduction of sound or images; magnetic data carriers, recording discs; automatic vending machines and mechanisms for coin-operated apparatus; cash registers, calculating machines, data processing equipment and computers; fire extinguishing apparatus

Class 10 . Surgical, medical, dental and veterinary apparatus and instruments, artificial limbs, eyes and teeth; orthopaedic articles; suture materials

Class 11 . Apparatus for lighting, heating, steam generating, cooking, refrigerating, drying ventilating, water supply and sanitary purposes

Class 12 . Vehicles; apparatus for locomotion by land, air or water

Class 13 . Firearms; ammunition and projectiles; explosives; fire works

Class 14 . Precious metals and their alloys and goods in precious metals or coated therewith, not included in other classes; jewellery, precious stones; horological and other chronometric instruments

Class 15. Musical instruments

Class 16 . Paper, cardboard and goods made from these materials, not included in other classes; printed matter; bookbinding material; photographs; stationery; adhesives for stationery or household purposes; artists’ materials; paint brushes; typewriters and office requisites (except furniture); instructional and teaching material (except apparatus); plastic materials for packaging (not included in other classes); playing cards; printers’ type; printing blocks

Class 17 . Rubber, gutta percha, gum, asbestos, mica and goods made from these materials and not included in other classes; plastics in extruded form for use in manufacture; packing, stopping and insulating materials; flexible pipes, not of metal

Class 18 . Leather and imitations of leather, and goods made of these materials and not included in other classes; animal skins, hides, trunks and travelling bags; umbrellas, parasols and walking sticks; whips, harness and saddlery

Class 19 . Building materials, (non-metallic), non-metallic rigid pipes for building; asphalt, pitch and bitumen; non-metallic transportable buildings; monuments, not of metal.

Class 20 . Furniture, mirrors, picture frames; goods(not included in other classes) of wood, cork, reed, cane, wicker, horn, bone, ivory, whalebone, shell, amber, mother- of-pearl, meerschaum and substitutes for all these materials, or of plastics

Class 21 . Household or kitchen utensils and containers(not of precious metal or coated therewith); combs and sponges; brushes(except paints brushes); brush making materials; articles for cleaning purposes; steelwool; unworked or semi-worked glass (except glass used in building); glassware, porcelain and earthenware not included in other classes

Class 22 . Ropes, string, nets, tents, awnings, tarpaulins, sails, sacks and bags (not included in other classes) padding and stuffing materials(except of rubber or plastics); raw fibrous textile materials

Class 23 . Yarns and threads, for textile use

Class 24 . Textiles and textile goods, not included in other classes; bed and table covers.

Class 25 . Clothing, footwear, headgear

Class 26 . Lace and embroidery, ribbons and braid; buttons, hooks and eyes, pins and needles; artificial flowers

Class 27 . Carpets, rugs, mats and matting, linoleum and other materials for covering existing floors; wall hangings(non-textile)

Class 28 . Games and playthings, gymnastic and sporting articles not included in other classes; decorations for Christmas trees

Class 29 . Meat, fish, poultry and game; meat extracts; preserved, dried and cooked fruits and vegetables; jellies, jams, fruit sauces; eggs, milk and milk products; edible oils and fats

Class 30 . Coffee, tea, cocoa, sugar, rice, tapioca, sago, artificial coffee; flour and preparations made from cereals, bread, pastry and confectionery, ices; honey, treacle; yeast, baking powder; salt, mustard; vinegar, sauces, (condiments); spices; ice

Class 31. Agricultural, horticultural and forestry products and grains not included in other classes; live animals; fresh fruits and vegetables; seeds, natural plants and flowers; foodstuffs for animals, malt

Class 32 . Beers, mineral and aerated waters, and other non-alcoholic drinks; fruit drinks and fruit juices; syrups and other preparations for making beverages

Class 33 .Alcoholic beverages(except beers)

Class 34 . Tobacco, smokers’ articles, matches

SERVICES

Class 35 .Advertising, business management, business administration, office functions.

Class 36 .Insurance, financial affairs; monetary affairs; real estate affairs.

Class 37 . Building construction; repair; installation services.

Class 38. Telecommunications.

Class 39. Transport; packaging and storage of goods; travel arrangement.

Class 40. Treatment of materials.

Class 41. Education; providing of training; entertainment; sporting and cultural activities.

Class 42. Scientific and technological services and research and design relating thereto; industrial analysis and research services; design and development of computer hardware and software.

Class 43. Services for providing food and drink; temporary accommodation.

Class 44. Medical services, veterinary services, hygienic and beauty care for human beings or animals; agriculture, horticulture and forestry services.

Class 45. Legal services; security services for the protection of property and individuals; personal and social services rendered by others to meet the needs of individuals.
