= Mekhela sador =

Traditional Assamese attire

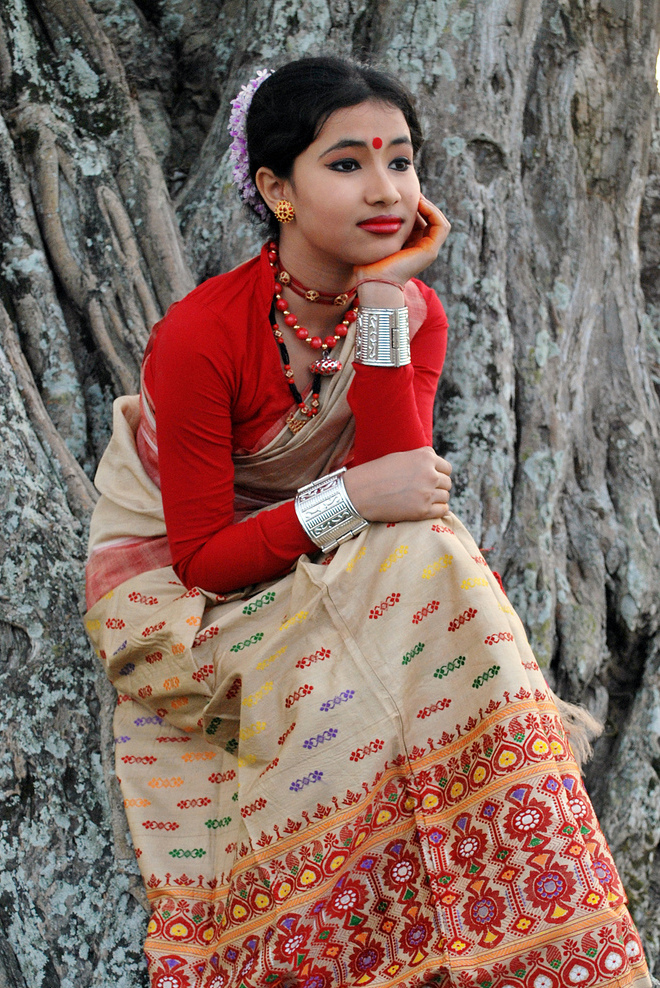
A girl wearing mekhela sador dress

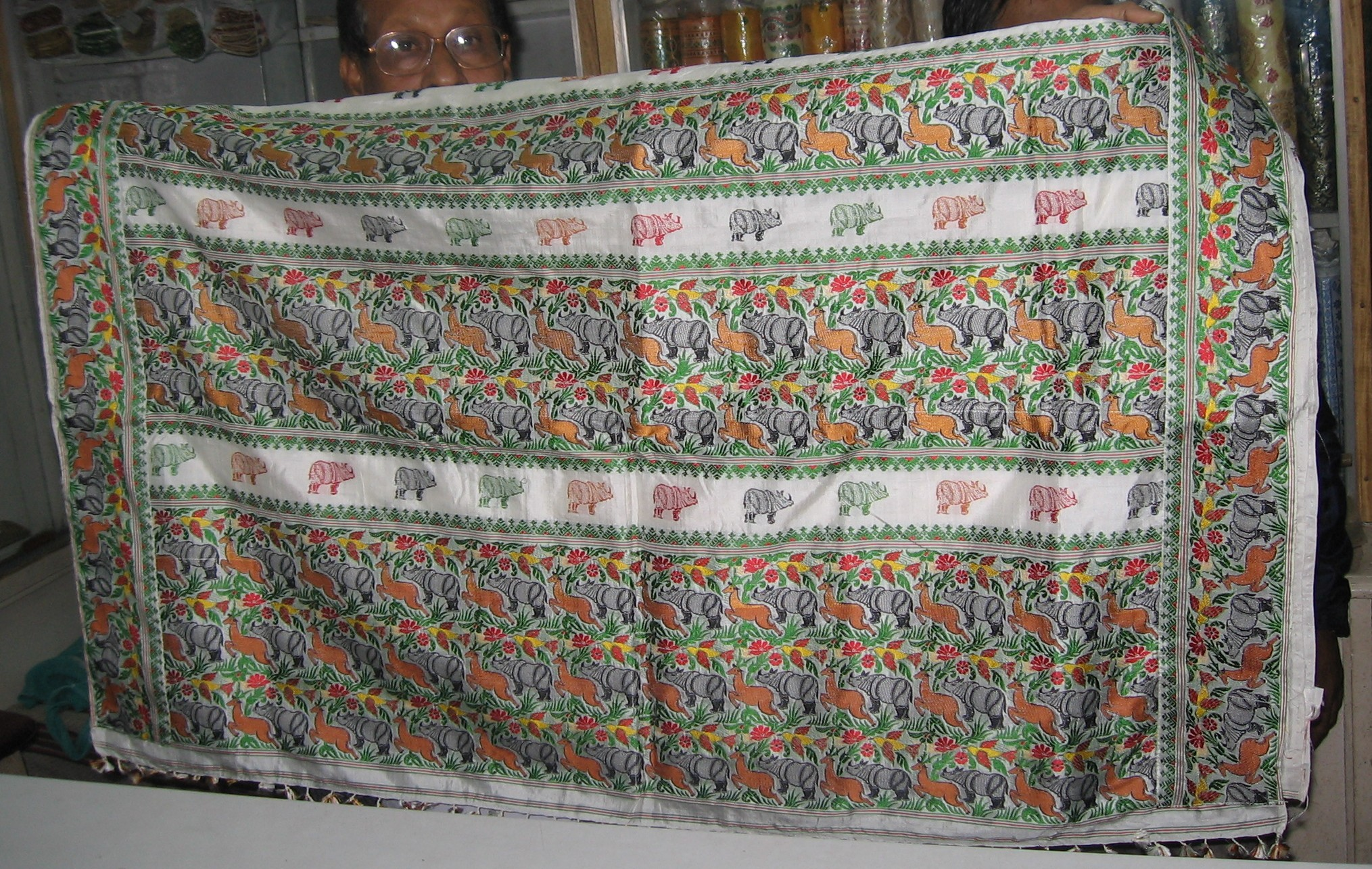
On display, a hand-woven mekhela chador in pat silk depicting an exquisite pattern of wildlife in Kaziranga

Mekhela sador is traditional clothing worn by women from Assam. It is a two-piece outfit, consisting of the mekhela (a cylindrical skirt) and the sador (a drape), and is generally made from Assam silk such as muga, eri or pat silk.

It is adorned with intricate designs, patterns, and motifs, often inspired by nature, Assamese culture, or mythological themes. The designs are predominantly handwoven by women. Common motifs include floral patterns, geometric shapes, and representations of local wildlife, which celebrate the region's natural beauty.

== Draping ==
The bottom portion, draped from the waist downwards, is called the mekhela. It is a wide cylindrical piece cloth that is folded into one or two pleats to fit around the waist and tucked in. The pleats are folded to the right and are typically fewer in number as opposed to the pleats of Saree, which are generally folded to the left and have multiple pleats. Strings are never used to tie the mekhela around the waist, though an underskirt with a string is often used.

The top portion of the two-piece dress, called the chador (pronounced: Sador), is a long piece of cloth that has one end tucked into the upper portion of the mekhela above the belly button and the rest is draped around the chest and back. The other end of the chador is tucked in the belly after making a few pleats. A fitted blouse is often worn with Mekhela chador. Traditionally, in the past, another garment called riha was worn as a chador or as an inner piece below the chador. A riha is still worn as part of the Assamese bridal trousseau and sometimes seen people wearing in indigenous traditional events like Bihu and other Assamese festivals. Ornamental designs on the mekhela-chadors are traditionally woven, never printed. Sometimes a woven pattern called the paari, is stitched along the sides of a chador, or along the bottom of a mekhela. The patterns include motifs of animals, birds, human forms, flowers, diamond, and celestial phenomenon. These indigenous patterns are woven by tribal and nontribal Weavers. The motifs are known as phul. The bright-hued diamond motifs representing fine workmanship is a typical and traditional feature of the textiles of Assam. In Pat and Muga silk, delicate designs of flowers and creepers while bold motifs of geometric shapes are typically found in Eri and Cotton.

== Material ==
Traditional mekhela chadors are made from the following materials:

- Muga
- Pat silk
- Eri silk

Some modern low-budget sets are also made with varying blends of cotton and muga or pat silk with synthetic materials.

== Availability ==
The mekhela chador is available in many stores across Guwahati and other cities of Assam. They are also available through various websites. The demand for pure pat is very high among customers. Mekhela Chador of Pat and polyester are dominating the market. But the demand of Muga, ‘golden silk of Assam' is low due to its high price and availability of substitutes like tassar which look very similar to the original Muga silk.

== See also ==
- Riha
- Muga
- Pathin
- Textiles and dresses of Assam
- Textile manufacturing terminology
- Culture of Assam
