= Sundari =

Sundari (lit. 'beautiful woman' in Indian languages) may refer to:

== Media ==
- Sundari (newspaper), a Tamil-language newspaper in Sri Lanka
- Sundari (Tamil TV series), a 2021 adaptation of the Kannada series
- Sundari (Marathi TV series), a 2021 adaptation of the Kannada series
- Sundari (Malayalam TV series), a 2021 adaptation of the Kannada series
- Sundari (paintings), a type of 19th-century erotic art print in Calcutta, British India
- Gnana Soundari (disambiguation)

== People ==
=== Surname ===
- Eva Kusuma Sundari (born 1965), Indonesian politician
- Mata Sundari (died 1747), Sikh religious leader and spouse of Guru Gobind Singh
- Swapna Sundari (dancer) (fl. 21st century), Indian dancer

=== Given name ===
- Sundari Mohan Das (1857–1950), Indian physician and political activist
- Sundari Nanda (fl. 6th century BC), half-sister of Buddha, known as simply Sundari
- Sundari K. Shridharani (1925–2012), Indian dancer
- Sundri Uttamchandani, Indian writer

== Other ==
- Sundari (tigress) (c. 2006–2013), a tiger in Ranthambore National Park, India
- Tripura Sundari, a Hindu deity also known as Lalita
- Sundari, a mango cultivar from India

== See also ==
- Sundar (disambiguation)
- Tripurasundari (disambiguation)
- Param Sundari (disambiguation)
