= Tripuri =

Tripuri refer to:

- Tripuri people, an ethnic group in India and Bangladesh, also known as Tipra people
  - Tripuri language
  - Tripuri nationalism
  - Tripuri calendar
  - Tripuri culture
  - Tripuri cuisine
  - Tripuri dances
  - Tripuri dress
  - Tripuri games and sports
- Tripuri Kshatriya, a Vaishnav caste group including almost all the members of the Tripuri, Reang, Jamatia and Noatia ethnic groups
- Tripuri, Madhya Pradesh, ancient Kalchuri capital near Jabalpur
- Twipra Kingdom, also called the Tripuri Kingdom
- Tripura (princely state), a British protectorate from 1809 to 1949
- Tripura, a state in northeast India

== See also ==
- Tipra (disambiguation)
- Tripura (disambiguation)
