= Param =

Param may refer to:

== Places ==
- Param, Rampur, Uttar Pradesh, India, a village
- Param, Iran, a village in East Azerbaijan Province
- Param, Mazandaran, a village in Mazandaran Province, Iran
- Param, Federated States of Micronesia, a municipality and an island

== People ==
- Param (given name), a list of people with the name
- Navin Param (born 1995), Singaporean cricketer

== Other uses ==
- PARAM, a series of Indian supercomputers
- Param (company), a video game developer

== See also ==
- Anish Paraam (born 1990), Singaporean cricketer
- Param Sundari (disambiguation)
