= T16 =

T16 may refer to:

== Automobiles ==
- Cooper T16, a British Formula Three racing car: see Cooper Mk.V
- Gordini T16, a racing car
- Peugeot 205 T16, a rally car
- Peugeot 208 T16, a rally car
- Rover T16 engine, an automobile engine

== Rail and transit ==
=== Locomotives ===
- Prussian T 16, a steam locomotive

=== Stations ===
- Kanzaki Station (Kagawa), Sanuki, Kagawa Prefecture, Japan
- Nangō-Jūhatchōme Station, Sapporo, Hokkaido, Japan
- Nishi-Kasai Station, Tokyo, Japan
- Nishiōji Oike Station, Kyoto, Japan
- Noe-Uchindai Station, Osaka, Japan
- Shiogama-guchi Station, Nagoya, Aichi Prefecture, Japan

== Other uses ==
- T16 fluorescent lamp
- German torpedo boat T16
- Machli (tigress), a Bengal tiger
- palawa kani, a constructed language
- T16 Carrier, a Canadian–built armoured personnel carrier
- T-16 Skyhopper, a fictional Star Wars vehicle
