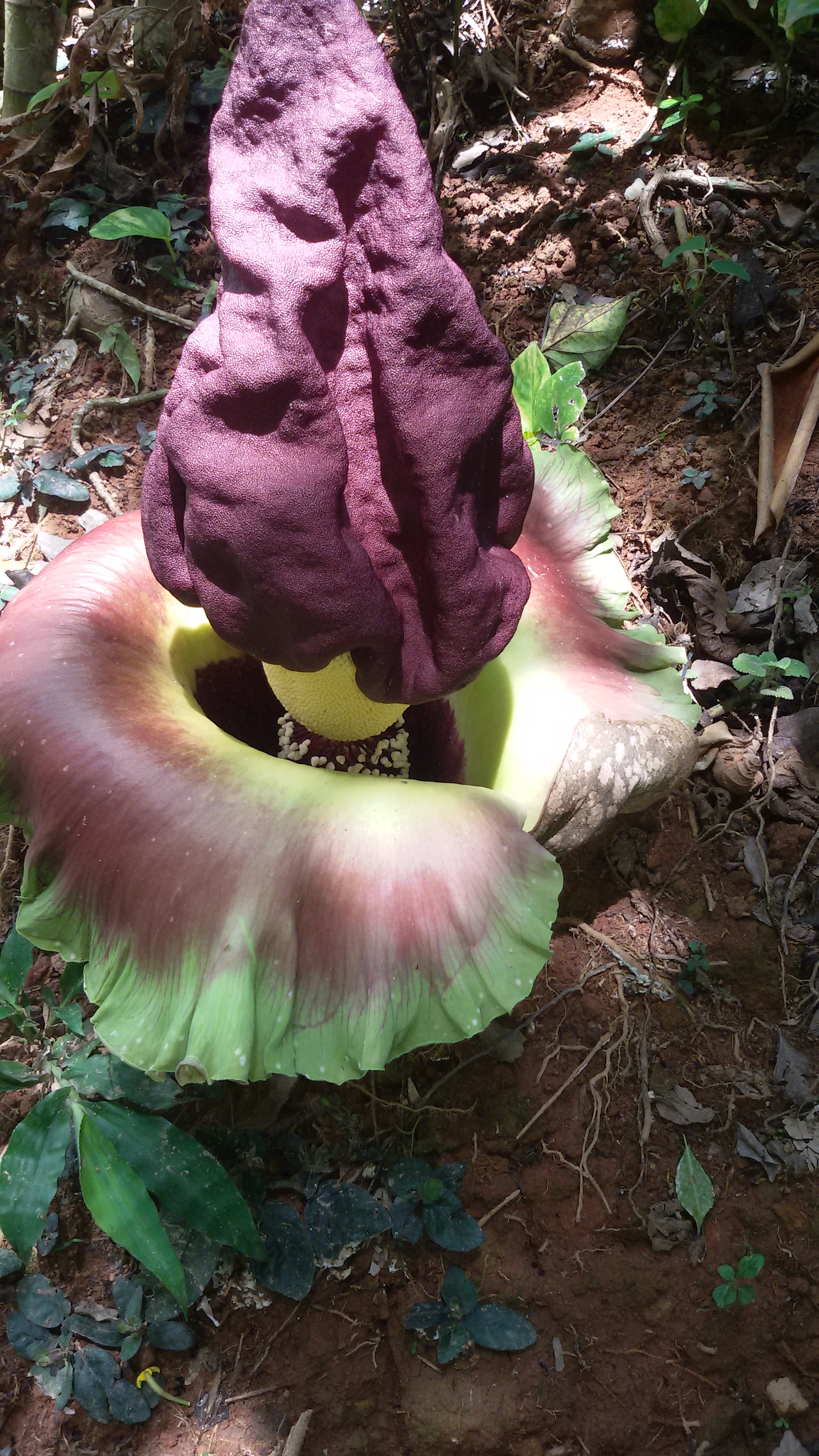
- Wild elephant foot yam

Conservation status
- Least Concern (IUCN 3.1)

Scientific classification
- Kingdom: Plantae
- Clade: Embryophytes
- Clade: Tracheophytes
- Clade: Spermatophytes
- Clade: Angiosperms
- Clade: Monocots
- Order: Alismatales
- Family: Araceae
- Genus: Amorphophallus
- Species: A. paeoniifolius

Binomial name
- Amorphophallus paeoniifolius (Dennst.) Nicolson

Synonyms
- 30 synonyms: Amorphophallus giganteus Blume; Arum rumphii Gaudich.; Candarum hookeri Schott; Candarum roxburghii Schott; Candarum rumphii Schott; Conophallus giganteus Schott ex Miq.; Dracontium paeoniifolium Dennst.; Kunda verrucosa Raf.; Amorphophallus campanulatus Decne.; Amorphophallus campanulatus var. blumei Prain; Amorphophallus campanulatus f. darnleyensis F.M.Bailey; Amorphophallus chatty Andrews; Amorphophallus decurrens (Blanco) Kunth; Amorphophallus dixenii K.Larsen & S.S.Larsen; Amorphophallus dubius Blume; Amorphophallus gigantiflorus Hayata; Amorphophallus malaccensis Ridl.; Amorphophallus microappendiculatus Engl.; Amorphophallus paeoniifolius var. campanulatus (Roxb.) Sivad.; Amorphophallus rex Prain; Amorphophallus sativus Blume; Amorphophallus virosus N.E.Br.; Arum campanulatum Roxb.; Arum decurrens Blanco; Arum phalliferum Oken; Arum rumphii Oken; Conophallus sativus (Blume) Schott; Dracontium polyphyllum G.Forst.; Dracontium polyphyllum Dennst.; Dunalia artensis Montrouz.; Hydrosme gigantiflora (Hayata) S.S.Ying; Plesmonium nobile Schott; Pythion campanulatum (Roxb.) Mart.

= Amorphophallus paeoniifolius =

Elephant foot yam

Staple root food in southeast Asia

Amorphophallus paeoniifolius, commonly known as the elephant foot yam or whitespot giant arum, is a tropical plant native to Island Southeast Asia. It is cultivated for its edible tubers in Southeast Asia, South Asia, Madagascar, New Guinea, and the Pacific islands. Because of its production potential and popularity as a vegetable in various cuisines, it can be raised as a cash crop. The plant and its tuber are also known as suran or jimmikand.

== Origin ==
The elephant foot yam is used as food in Island Southeast Asia, Mainland Southeast Asia, South Asia, New Guinea, Oceania, and Madagascar. Its origin and center of domestication was formerly considered to be India, where it is most widely utilized as a food resource. But a genetic study in 2017 has shown that Indian populations of elephant foot yams have lower genetic diversity than those in Island Southeast Asia, therefore it is now believed that elephant foot yams originated from Island Southeast Asia and spread westwards into Thailand and India, resulting in three independent domestication events. From Island Southeast Asia, they were also spread even further west into Madagascar, and eastwards to coastal New Guinea and Oceania by the Austronesian migrations, though they may have spread south into Australia without human intervention.

== Description ==
Amorphophallus paeoniifolius is a large tuberous herb reaching up to 2 m (6 ft 7 in) tall when in leaf phase, and the tuber may be 30 cm (12 in) wide, 20 cm (7.9 in) high and weigh up to 15 kg (33 lb).

=== Flowering ===
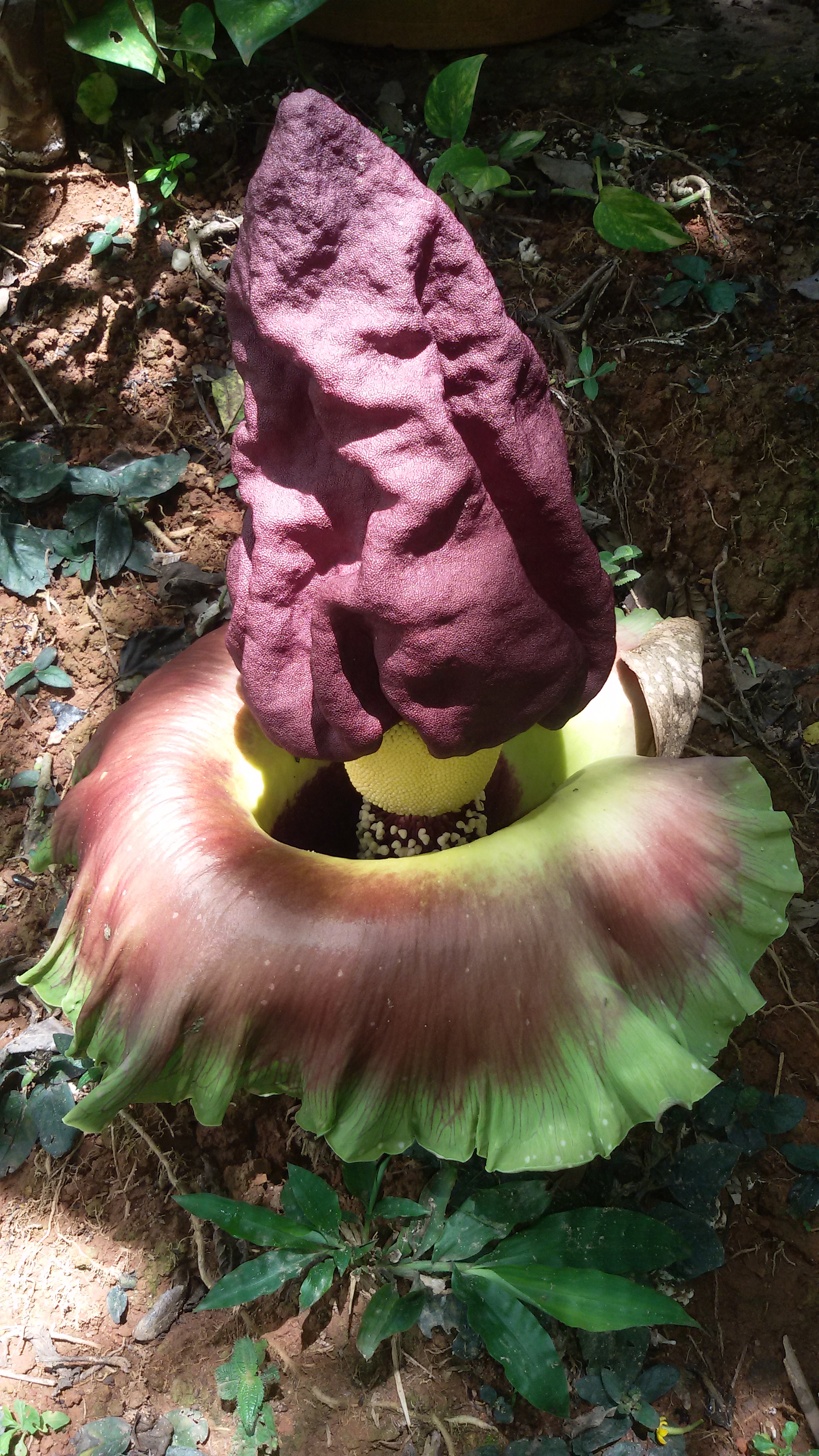
Inflorescence

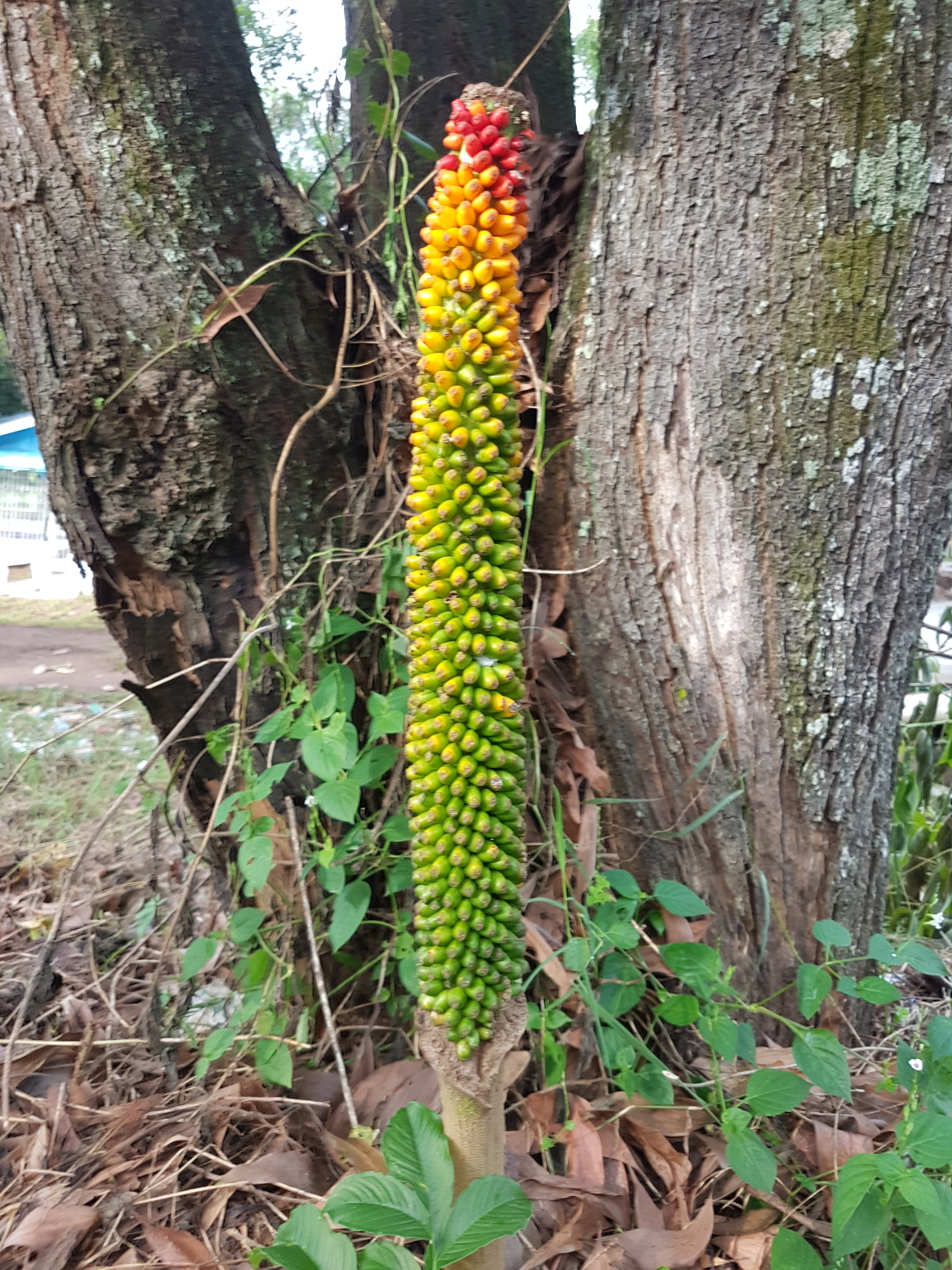
Fruit spike

The plant blooms annually around the beginning of the rainy season. The flower bud emerges from the corm as a purple shoot, and later blooms as a purple inflorescence. The pistillate (female) and staminate (male) flowers are on the same plant and are crowded in cylindrical masses as an inflorescence. The top part is responsible for secreting mucus that gives off a putrid, pungent smell that is used to attract pollinating insects, the middle part of the inflorescence contains staminate flowers, and the base of the inflorescence contains pistillate flowers. The stigmas of the female flowers will be receptive on the first day of the bloom, when the pungent smell draws pollinating insects inside, and the inflorescence closes, trapping them for a night to allow the pollen deposited on the insect to be transferred to the stigmas.

Later in the second day, the female flower is no longer receptive to pollens, the male flowers start to bloom, and the inflorescence opens again. This allows the pollen to be deposited on the emerging insects to pollinate other flowers, while preventing the pollen from the same inflorescence fertilising itself, preventing inbreeding.

In 24–36 hours, after the first bloom of the inflorescence, the inflorescence's female flowers start developing into berries bright red fruiting bodies, and other parts of the inflorescence start wilting away. The berries are red when ripe and are not quite round, being subglobose or ovoid.

While the flowers are in bloom they also produce heat.

== Uses ==
=== As food ===
In Indian state of West Bengal, Assam and in neighbouring country Bangladesh, it is called ol (ওল/ওল কচু). It is usually eaten as mashed or fried or added to curries and, more rarely, used in pickle or to make ol chips. In some households, the green leaves and stems are also cooked as green vegetables.

In Maharashtra, Uttar Pradesh and Gujarat, It is called suran.

In Bihar, it is used in oal curry (i.e. elephant foot curry), oal bharta or chokha, pickles, and chutney. Oal chutney is also called barabar chutney as it has mango, ginger, and oal in equal quantities, hence the name barabar (meaning "in equal amount").

In Chhattisgarh, it is called zimmikanda or zaminkand and eaten as curry, being a delicacy among people of Chhattisgarh.

In Tripura, it is called batema and prepared by making a paste with sodium bicarbonate (baking soda) and water to remove its raphides (calcium oxalate needles). The paste is shaped into buns and boiled with water containing baking soda, after which the water is discarded. The buns are then cut into pieces and combined with fresh garlic paste and mosdeng (a spicy paste of dried fish/shrimp and chili). Also, the leaves and stems are eaten by chopping them into pieces and frying.

In Karnataka, it is called suvarnagadde.

In South India, especially Kerala, it is known as chena (ചേന), and the tuber has been a part of people's diet for centuries. In Tamil it is called kaaraa karanai kizangu (காறாக்கரணைக் கிழங்கு) or chénaikkizangu (சேனைக்கிழங்கு). It is mainly served as steamed pieces (പുഴുക്ക്) along with traditional chutney made of green chili, coconut oil, shallots and garlic, although the curry preparation is also common as a side dish for rice. It is made into a thick chutney (masiyal, மசியல்), typically eaten as an accompaniment with a rice dish. The tuber is known as "Kanda Gadda"(కంద గడ్డ). The tuber is popular among the Telugu-speaking states, too, where it is cooked along with the leaves of Indian spinach, tamarind pulp, and spices, to a vegan stew that is specifically served and consumed during devotional feasts and auspicious celebrations like housewarming and baby-showers. It is also cut into thin slices or strips and fried as a snack, much like potato fries. It has served as the main source of carbohydrates especially during the famine-stricken days of the region in the past along with the more popular tapioca for many centuries. The flower bud, before it blooms, is also used for making curry. All parts of the flower can be used for making different types of side dishes.

In Nepal, it is called oal, kaan, or suran, and is grown mainly in the southern plains of the country. Its curry is consumed in Jitiya and Deepawali festivals.

It is a traditional food of the Batek people in the east coast of the Malay Peninsula; they cook the tubers or ubi hakay by boling them in bamboo.

In the Philippines, it is known as pongapong. The young leaves, stems, and corms are consumed as vegetables or turned into desserts. They are thoroughly cooked to destroy the stinging oxalate crystals.

=== As medicine ===
The elephant-foot yam is widely used in Indian medicine and is recommended as a remedy in all three of the major Indian medicinal systems: Ayurveda, Siddha and Unani. The corm is prescribed in those systems for a variety of ailments. The tuber is reported to be useful in treatment of piles.

== Cultivation ==
A. paeoniifolius suffers from Dasheen mosaic virus.

== Culture ==
In the epic drama film Mother India, the protagonist Nargis finds a small piece of elephant foot yam while ploughing her field during severe famine.

== Gallery ==
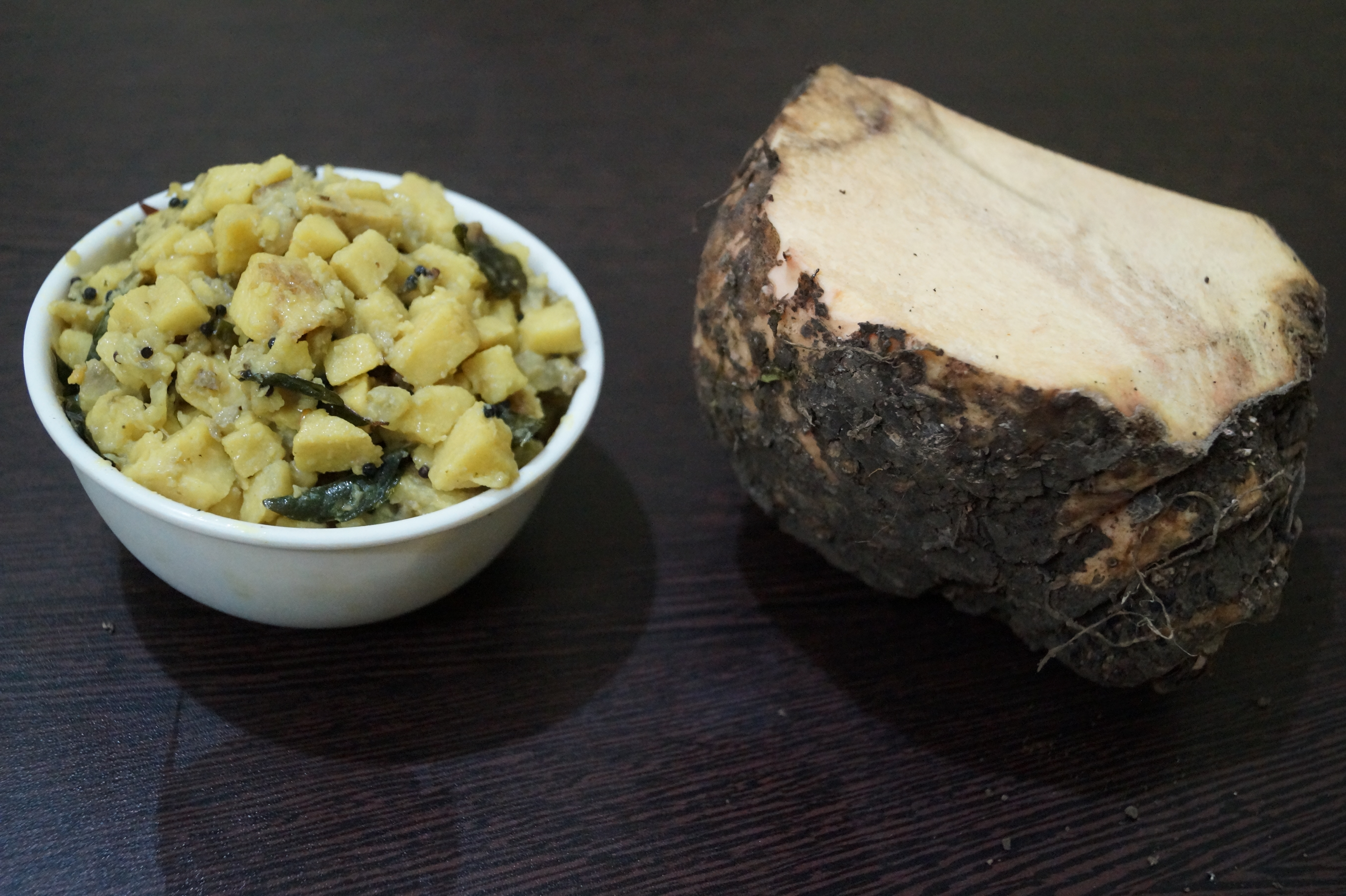
With thoran prepared in Kerala style cuisine

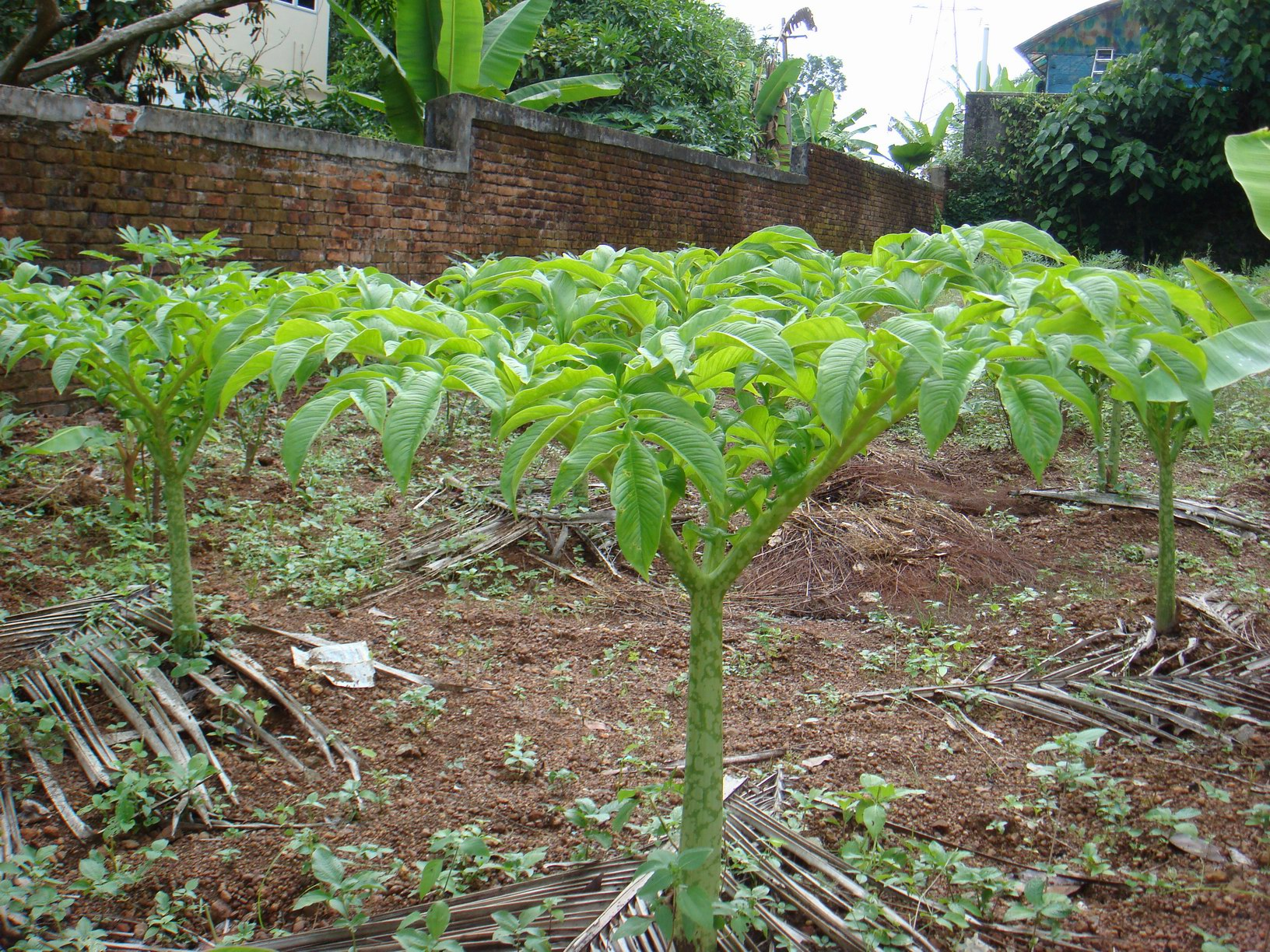
India

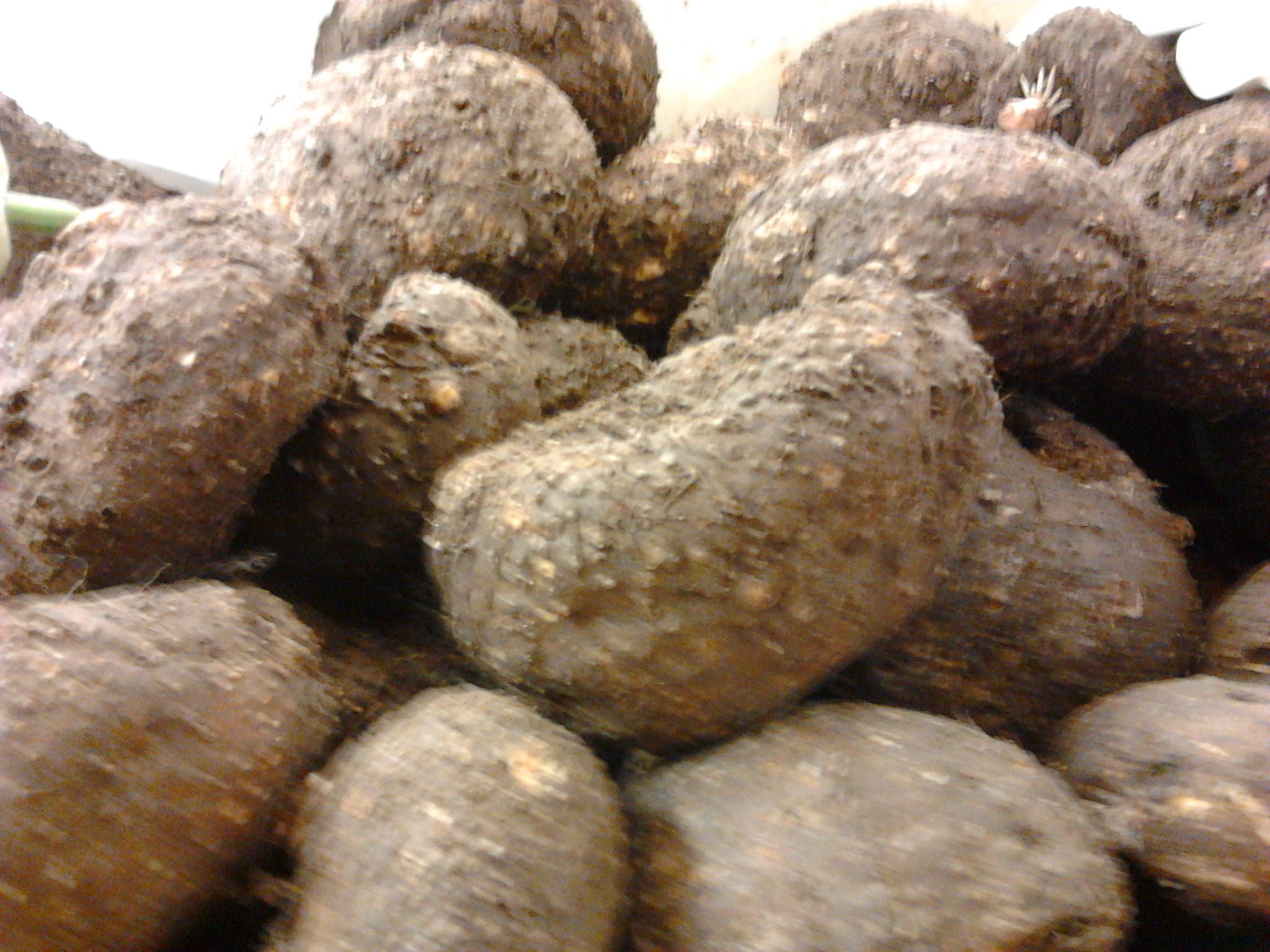
Corms

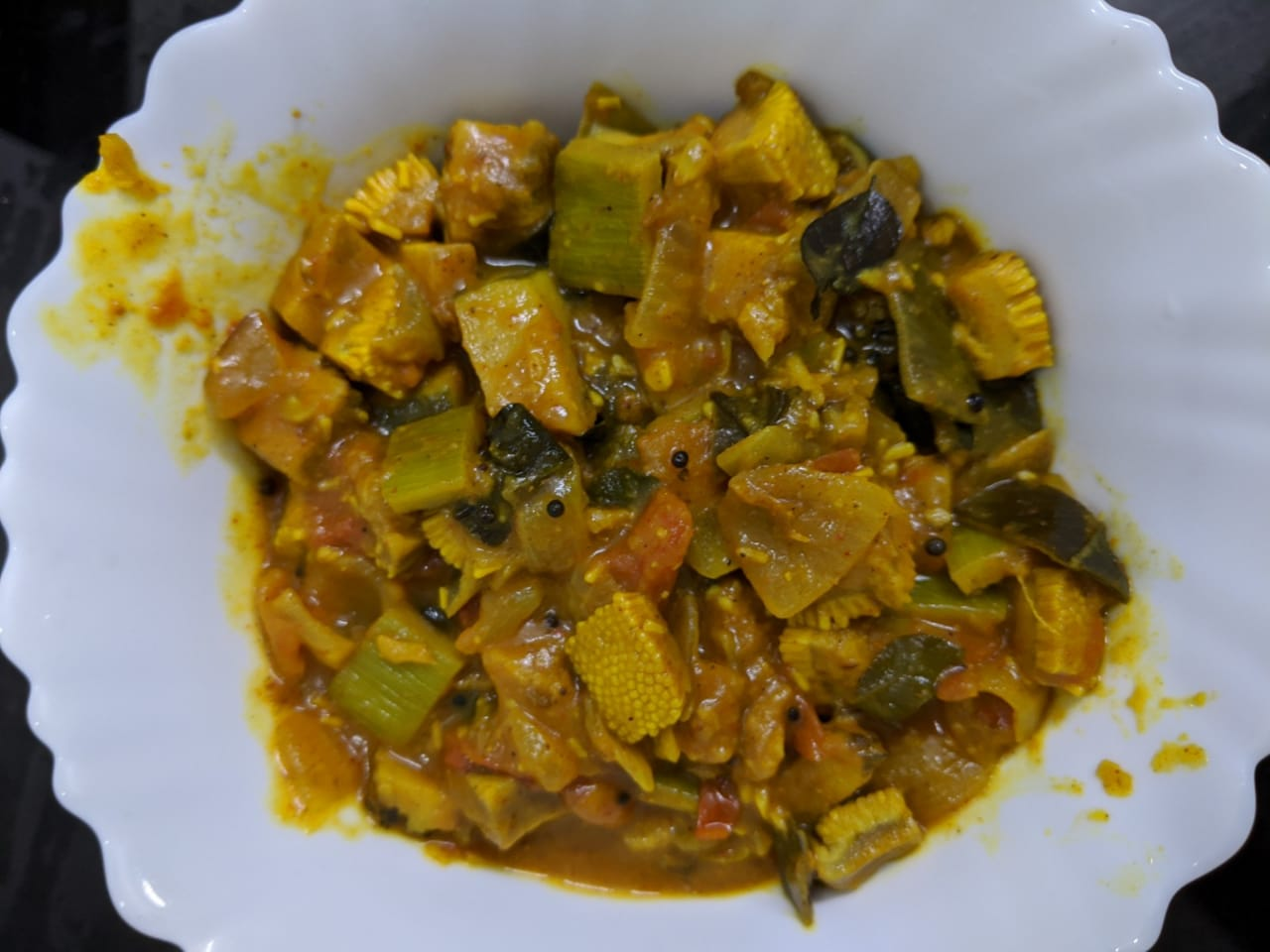
Curry made using flower

== See also ==
- Carrion flower
- Amorphophallus titanum
- Domesticated plants and animals of Austronesia
- Alocasia macrorrhizos
- Colocasia esculenta
- Cyrtosperma merkusii
