= Tripurasundari =

Tripurasundari may refer to:

- Tripura Sundari, Hindu goddess, a form of Durga
- Tripurasundari (film), a 1978 Indian film
- Tripura Sundari (TV series), an Indian Kannada-language TV series

== People ==
- Queen Tripurasundari of Nepal, regent and writer-translator
- Tripura Sundari Ammani, queen of Mysore

== Places ==
- Tripurasundari, Baitadi, a village in Mahakali zone, Nepal
- Tripurasundari, Dolpa, a municipality in Karnali province, Nepal
- Tripurasundari, Dhading, a rural municipality in Dhading district, Nepal
- Tripurasundari, Sindhupalchok, a rural municipality in Sindhupalchok, Nepal
- Tripura Sundari Temple, a Hindu temple for the goddess in Tripura, India
  - Tripura Sundari Express, passenger train in India plying to and from the temple

== See also ==
- Tripura (disambiguation)
- Sundari (disambiguation)
