= Chuak =

Traditional Tripuri rice-beer

- Type: Beer
- Place of origin: India
- Region or state: Tripura
- Created by: Tripuri people
- Main ingredients: Glutinous rice, water
- Similar dishes: Judima

Chuak is the traditional Tripuri rice-beer, popular in Northeast India. It is made by fermenting rice in water. It is usually drunk on social occasions of any Tripuri ceremony as a ritual. Chuak is offered to village elders on any occasion or celebration in a traditional Tripuri family.

It is traditionally offered to guests and village elders during ceremonies and social gatherings among the Tripuri people.
