= Gnana Soundari =

Gnana Soundari may refer to these Indian films:

- Gnana Soundari (Citadel film), a 1948 Indian film by F. Nagoor and Joseph Thaliath Jr., produced by Citadel Film
- Gnana Soundari (Gemini film), 1948 Indian film by Murugadasa, produced by Gemini Studios

== See also ==
- Sundari (disambiguation)
