= Param Sundari =

Param Sundari (lit. 'Eternal Beauty' in Hindi) may refer to:

- "Param Sundari" (song), a song by A. R. Rahman and Shreya Ghoshal from the 2021 Indian film Mimi
- Param Sundari (film), a 2025 Indian romantic comedy film by Tushar Jalota

== See also ==
- Param (disambiguation)
- Sundari (disambiguation)
