= Tripura (disambiguation) =

Tripura is a state of India.

Tripura may also refer to:

- Tripura (mythology), three cities in Hindu mythology
- Tripura Kingdom, or Twipra Kingdom, a historical kingdom of India from the 15th century to 1949
- Tripura (princely state), a princely state in India during and shortly after the British Raj
- Tripura (Telugu author) (1928–2013), Indian Telugu-language short-story writer
- Tripura (film), a 2015 Indian Telugu film
- Macrobrochis or Tripura, a genus of moths

== See also ==
- Tripuri (disambiguation)
- Tripura Buranji, an 18th-century Indian manuscript
- Tripura Sundari, a Hindu goddess
- Tripurasundari (disambiguation)
