= Tipra =

Tipra or TIPRA may refer to:

- Tipra (moth), a genus of moth
- Tax Increase Prevention and Reconciliation Act of 2005 (TIPRA), a tax law of the United States
- Tripuri people, the original inhabitants of the Kingdom of Tripura in north-east India and Bangladesh
- The Indigenous Progressive Regional Alliance (TIPRA), a political party of Tripura, India

== See also ==
- Tripuri (disambiguation)
