= Tripuri cuisine =

Culinary traditions of Tripuri people

Tripuri cuisine (Borok Chamung) is the type of traditional foods of the Tripuri/Tiprasa people served in the northeastern region of India (mainly Tripura) and Bangladesh. The Tripuri cuisine reflect the organic lifestyle and evolving cultural trend with times from its natural Huk (shifting cultivation) to now settled farming.

== Dishes ==
=== Mui Borok ===
A dish made with rice and dry fish.

=== Wahan Mosdeng ===
A meat based dish made from wild boar historically. Now pork, beef and chicken are used.

=== Wak Bahan ===
Another pork based delicacy made with jackfruit and Papaya as additional ingredients.

=== Soups and stews ===
Tripuri cuisine include a fermented fish called berma which combined with various vegetables forms the stew dish Berma Bwtwi.

=== Mosdeng ===
Mosdeng is a popular side-dish of a Tripuri meal. It is prepared with chilli, herbs, onion, and any kind of seasonal vegetable.

== Beverages ==
Chuak: a traditional Tripuri rice-beer

== See also ==
- Tripuri culture
- Tripuri people
