= Param, Rampur =

- village
- Location in Uttar Pradesh, India Param, Rampur (India)
- Coordinates: 28.57°N 79.12°E
- Country: India
- State: Uttar Pradesh
- District: Rampur

Government
  - Social worker: Mohan Swaroop
- Elevation: 567 m (1,860 ft)

Population (2011)
  - Total: 6,739

Languages
  - Official: Hindi
- Time zone: UTC+5:30 (IST)
- PIN: 243701
- Telephone code: 5960
- Vehicle registration: UP 22
- Sex ratio: 55:45 ♂/♀
- Website: www.rampur.nic.in

Param is a village in Rampur district in the Indian state of Uttar Pradesh. It is 3 km from Ram Ganga and 8 km from the Grand Truck Road.

== Background ==
The village comprises three small villages. There are seventeen castes living in Param villages. Param has two temples and one mosque. Hatt is a market near Param Junior High School. The market is open Thursday and Sunday, year round, from 11:30 AM to 6:30 PM. It has organic produce all year round, with as much as possible locally grown. More than 25 vendors, including six farmers, offer organic foods, from fresh greens to root vegetables, apples, citrus fruits, and milk.

The First Regional Rural Bank of India, Prathama Bank, has a branch for village farmers since 1979. There is a Param E-Seva Kendra near the Prathama Bank to fulfill the villager's Information Technological needs. The Village is also having a VLE Center or Common Service Center (CSC), under the E-Governance Project of Govt. of India.

== Education ==
The village Panchayat has one primary Hindi-medium school and one Junior High School. Param has four private English medium schools.

With a population of 6739, Param has four schools, one bank, one Police Chowki, a post office. Medical services are provided by one Homeopathic, one Ayurvedic hospital and one animal hospital.

Param Village has the registered head office of Training Network Group working in the field of Skill Development sector to reform the youths and their career establishment. The group is also working with various government schemes like PMKVY, DDUKVY, PMG DISHA, RPL, NIESBUD etc.

The residence of this village gets benefited by various services like education on health and wellness by doing yoga and meditation running under the ParamYog Academy at Param Dhaam managed by Param Prayas Foundation which is operated by volunteered of the village.

== Gram Panchayat ==
The village is governed by a Directorate of Village panchayat which has the chief of the village i.e. Gram Pradhan and BTC members. They are the elected representatives of the village. Elections are conducted every five years.

Village Param is the largest gram Panchayat in Tehsil Milak of district Rampur. Within the Indian government administrative system, Gram Panchayat is responsible for setting up development projects within their areas. Param Panchayat controls Param village as well as Patti and Mohanpur villages.

== Communication ==
BSNL, Aircel, Airtel, Reliance, Vodafone are communication providers to Param. The village is also having an infra service provider companies like TNG Infratel & TNG Technologies who jointly works with these telecom operators.

== Transport ==
The village has transport facilities in the form of Private Mini Bus, Autorickshaws. Private run Omni bus operates from the nearby town Milak to Param daily.

== Entertainment ==
There are no cinema theaters in and around Param. The residents of Param used to arrange an Art and Drama Company for their entertainment twice in a year. Most of the town residents have access to Doordarshan television channels and some people have Reliance BiG TV & TATA Sky.

Param has facilities like a tennis court, badminton court, table tennis Club, and an athletics ground, inside the Param's market yard.

== Geography ==
Param is located at 28.34°N 79.7°E. It has an average elevation of 173 metres (567 ft). Param has covered 864.34 km^{2}. area and having 845 households.

== Demographics ==
As of 2005 India census, Param had a population of 5632. Males constitute 55% of the population and females 45%. Param has an average literacy rate of 67%, higher than the national average of 59.5%: male literacy is 76%, and female literacy is 58%. In Param, 19% of the population is under 6 years of age. Some facts about Param as of July 2006 :=

- Area of Param-864.34,
- Total households-1214,
- Male population-2989,
- Female population-2887,
- SC/ ST male-846,
- SC/ ST female-729,
- Male literate-583,
- Female literate-75.

== Floods in Param ==
Floods entered on 22 Sept 2010 into the village, and in 1978, and in 1988.

Param lies within the basin of the Ganges system, which itself is a part of the greater Ganges–Brahmaputra–Mega basin. It travels along UP state.

Due to heavy rain in the hilly catchment areas, the quantity of water being released at Hathnikund went up from 29,262 cu ft/s (828.6 m^{3}/s) at 2am on Wednesday, 22 Sept 2010 to 607,076 cu ft/s (17,190.5 m^{3}/s) at 3pm. "The same amount was being released till 4pm. After that, the release went down only slightly to 566,728 cu ft/s (16,047.9 m^{3}/s) at 6pm 22 Sept 2010."

== Param in News due to Snake bites ==
Param village was highlighted by the media due to snake bite of 52 peoples in first week of October 2016. Residents of Param village in Uttar Pradesh's Rampur district are living under the constant fear of snake bites. In just a fortnight, at least three people in Param have died of snake bites. Besides, over fifty villagers have been bitten by what locals claim is a single ‘ichchaadhaari’ (form-changing) snake. Sandhya's 18-year-old daughter died after being bitten by a snake when she had gone out to relieve herself. Another woman was bitten by a snake while out to gather firewood. Rattled by the rising snake bite incidents, villagers now fear going outdoors. Some even refuse to send their kids to school. Unable to find a solution, villagers have now turned to superstition to ‘pacify’ the ‘ichchaadhaari’ snake.
