= Sundari (Tamil TV series) =

Indian television series

- Also known as: Oru Sarasari Pennin Porattam
- Genre: Drama
- Directed by: Azhagar Saamy
- Starring: Gabriella Sellus; Shreegopika Neelanath; Jishnu Menon; Krishna; Baby Lithanya
- Opening theme: "Aathangara Kaatre"; Shweta Mohan (Vocals)
- Country of origin: India
- Original language: Tamil
- No. of seasons: 2
- No. of episodes: 1158

Production
- Producer: Cinematographer Karaikudi Balasubramaniem (KT.Balu _ Manonmani Stores )
- Cinematography: Banumurugan; Vijayapaandi
- Running time: 22-24 minutes
- Production companies: Sun Entertainment; Miracle Media

Original release
- Network: Sun TV
- Release: 22 February 2021 – 1 December 2024

Sundari is a 2021 Indian Tamil-language dramatic series having two seasons. The first season of the series stars Gabriella Sellus in the title role along with Shreegopika Neelanath and Jishnu Menon. It premiered on Sun TV on 22 February 2021 and ended on 26 August 2023. After a 7-year leap, it continued the second season of the series starring Gabriella Sellus in the lead role along with Jishnu Menon, Krishna, Baby Lithanya Sivabalan and Shreegopika Neelanath in a cameo appearance. It Started airing from 28 August 2023 onwards and ended on 1 December 2024 and is replaced by Annam serial. It is available for worldwide streaming on Sun NXT.

== Series overview ==
Series	Episodes	Originally released	
Series	Episodes	First released	Last released
1	762	22 February 2021	26 August 2023
2	382	28 August 2023	1 December 2024

== Plot ==
=== Season 1 ===
Sundari Devi alias Sundari is the story of a girl who faces discrimination for her dark complexion, yet she fights against adversities in life. She has a kind heart but struggles to find the right man to marry. Undeterred, she strives to become an IAS officer. Her journey towards achieving her goal faces many challenges, strengthening her belief that inner beauty is more important than physical appearance, which forms the crux of the story.

Karthick, who is from Sundari's village and her relative, marries her due to pressure from his family but desires to marry a fair-skinned woman for life. It also features the fair-skinned urban girl, Anupriya alias Anu, who is modern, empowered, and waiting for a loving and sincere partner. Karthick marries Anu and abandons Sundari.

Anu is made a scapegoat by Karthik and she's not allowed to make her own decisions by scapegoating her over her health issues. However, Karthick is shown in a better light of wanting to have a family with Anu for her skin complexion that he also falls for her sincere love. Yet he is perverse and manipulates her for his selfish desires because of his fantasies. As a result, Anu becomes pregnant with Karthik's child. Sundari learns the truth but chooses to remain silent as she has a great respect for Anu and wants to protect her and the unborn child. After many twists and turns, Anu gives birth to a daughter named Thamizh.

At last, Anu and Sundari's family come to know about the true face of Karthick. Anu finally leaves the house to an unknown location after giving her child Thamizh to Sundari to take full responsibility as mother of Thamizh. It shown that Karthick committed suicide and Sundari is going abroad to pursue her training along with Thamizh and grandmother Gandhimathi.

=== Season 2 ===
Seven years Later, Sundari Devi alias Sundari is an IAS officer and she lives with her grandmother Gandhimathi, her adopted daughter Thamizh (who is Anu and Karthick's daughter), Krishna and Malini. It is also the story of Vetriselvan alias Vetri, a former IAS officer who lives with his son, Akhilan alias Akhil. Vetri and Sundari fall in love with each other.

Anu is presumed to be dead. It also shows that after Anu's death, Karthick is still alive and works as PT Master in the school where his daughter Thamizh and Akhilan study. Meanwhile, Rajappan a ruthless village president and Porkodi, his mother-in-law create problems for Sundari and Vetri. Karthick enters to create complications in Sundari's life and tries to get Thamizh back. How the protagonists emerge from his devious schemes forms the crux of the story.

In the end, Anu is revealed to be alive. Karthick has realized his mistakes, asks forgiveness from Sundari and reunites with Anu. Finally, Sundari and Vetri get married and live happily along with Thamizh and Akhilan.

== Cast ==
=== Season 1 ===
==== Main ====
- Gabriella Sellus as Sundari Devi
  - Deepthi Sri as Child Sundari
- Shreegopika Neelanath as Anupriya "Anu"
  - Baby Ahana as Child Anu
- Jishnu Menon as Karthikeyan

==== Recurring ====
- P. R. Varalakshmi as Gandhimathi
- Deepthi Rajendran as Malini
- Aravish Kumar as Krishnakanthan aka Krishna
- Manohar Krishnan / Sathish / Manohar Krishna as Murugan
- Niharika Harshu / Premi Venkat as Mallika Devi
- Minnal Deepa as Lakshmi Murugan: Murugan's wife
- Lakshmi Vasudevan / J.Lalitha as Selvi
- Vigneshwaran as Arun
- Jay Srinivas Kumar as Siddharth aka Siddhu
- Soundarajan as Ramasubbu
- Arumpon Balaji as Kurangu Kumar
- Lailaa as Sudha
- Sangeetha Balan as Janaki alias Jaanu
- Arunkumar Padmanathan as Pazhani (Dead)
- Indumathy Manikandan as Valliamma (Dead)
- Hariharan as Dilli
- Prithiksha Sankar as Nila
- Murali Kumar as Manimaaran alias Mani
- Nivedha Pankaj as Meena
- Vj Ayub as Dr. Shiva
- L. Raja as Sankarapandian alias "Shankar" (Dead)
- Gracy Thangavel as Viji

==== Special appearances ====
- Mime Gopi as Kalyana Sundaram (Dead) (2021)
- Vaiyapuri as Kattam Kandhaswamy (2021)
- Krithika Annamalai as ACP Geetha (2021)
- Sandhya Jagarlamudi as Radha: (2021)
- Tharani Suresh Kumar as Periyanayaki aka Berry (2021)
- Swetha Khelge as Thulasi (2021)
- VJ Aswath as Himself (2022)
- Swetha Senthilkumar as Herself (2022)
- Rakesh KM as Himself (2022)
- Nila Gracy as Devi (2022)
- Kausalya as Nandan Bharathi (2022)
- Pondy Ravi as Murugan's friend (2023)

=== Season 2 ===
==== Main ====
- Gabriella Sellus as IAS Sundari Devi
- Baby Lithanya Sivabalan as Thamizh
- Krishna as Ex-Collector Vetriselvan
- Jishnu Menon as Karthikeyan/KS Master
- Master Sarvesh Raghav as Akhilan alias "Akhil"
- Shreegopika Neelanath as Anupriya alias Anu / Radha (Cameo)

==== Recurring ====
- P. R. Varalakshmi as Gandhimathi
- Deepthi Rajendran as Malini
- Aravish Kumar as Krishnakanthan aka Krishna
- Manohar Krishnan in dual role as:
  - Murugan
  - Ayyapan
- Papri Ghosh as Usha
- Arunraja as Rajappan (Dead)
- Vadivukkarasi as Porkkodi (Dead)
- Bharatha Naidu as Chinnaponnu
- Archana as Latha Ayyapan: Ayyapan's wife
- Minnal Deepa as Lakshmi Murugan: Murugan's wife
- Revathy Sankar/ Dharani as Umaiyaal
- J.Lalitha as Selvi (Dead)
- Vigneshwaran as Arun
- Soundarajan as Ramasubbu
- Manikantan as Shekhar
- Nanditha as Thangam
- Hariharan as Dilli
- Ravivarman as Vasudevan
- Krishna Kumar as Police Officer Penner

==== Special Appearances ====
- Kausalya as Nandan Bharathi (2024)
- Anu Sulash as Mythili (2023, Dead)
- Premi Venkat as Mallika Devi (2023/2024)
- Murali Kumar as Manimaaran alias Mani (2024)
- Arumpon Balaji as Kurangu Kumar (2024)
- Jay Srinivas Kumar as Siddharth aka Siddhu (2024)
- Lavanya as Malar Sister (2024)
- Gayatri Shastri as Saranya (2024)

== Casting ==
=== Season 1 ===
The series is a family melodrama that airs on Sun TV. Gabriella Sellus was cast in the female lead role of Sundari.

=== Season 2 ===
Some cast members from the first season were retained except Shreegopika. Additionally, new characters were introduced in the new season, like Master Sarvesh Raghav and few others. Krishna Raghunandan was cast in the male lead role in the serial, making his comeback to Tamil television after Thalattu. Vadivukkarasi was cast in October 2023.

== Adaptations ==
=== Season 1 ===
Language	Title	Original release	Network(s)	Last aired	Notes	Ref.
Kannada	Sundari ಸುಂದರಿ	11 January 2021	Sun Udaya	12 August 2023	Original	
Tamil	Sundari சுந்தரி	22 February 2021	Sun TV	26 August 2023	Remake	
Bengali	Sundari সুন্দরী	19 July 2021	Sun Bangla	11 June 2023	Remake	
Telugu	Sundari సుందరి	23 August 2021	Sun Gemini	17 August 2024	Remake	
Marathi	Sundari सुंदरी	17 October 2021	Sun Marathi	29 June 2024	Remake	
Malayalam	Sundari സുന്ദരി	15 November 2021	Sun Surya	11 February 2024	Remake	
Hindi	Thodi Si Umeed Thoda Sa Aasmaan थोड़ी सी उम्मीद थोड़ा सा आसमान	6 July 2026	Sun Neo	Ongoing	Remake	

=== Season 2 ===
Language(s)	Title(s)	Original release	Network(s)	Last aired	Notes	Ref.
Tamil	Sundari 2 சுந்தரி	28 August 2023	Sun TV	1 December 2024	Original	
Malayalam	Sundari 2 സുന്ദരി	12 February 2024	Sun Surya	21 July 2024	Remake	
Kannada	Anu Pallavi ಅನು ಪಲ್ಲವಿ	16 February 2025	Sun Udaya	30 May 2026	Remake	
