= Sundari painting =

19th-century erotic art depicting Bengali women

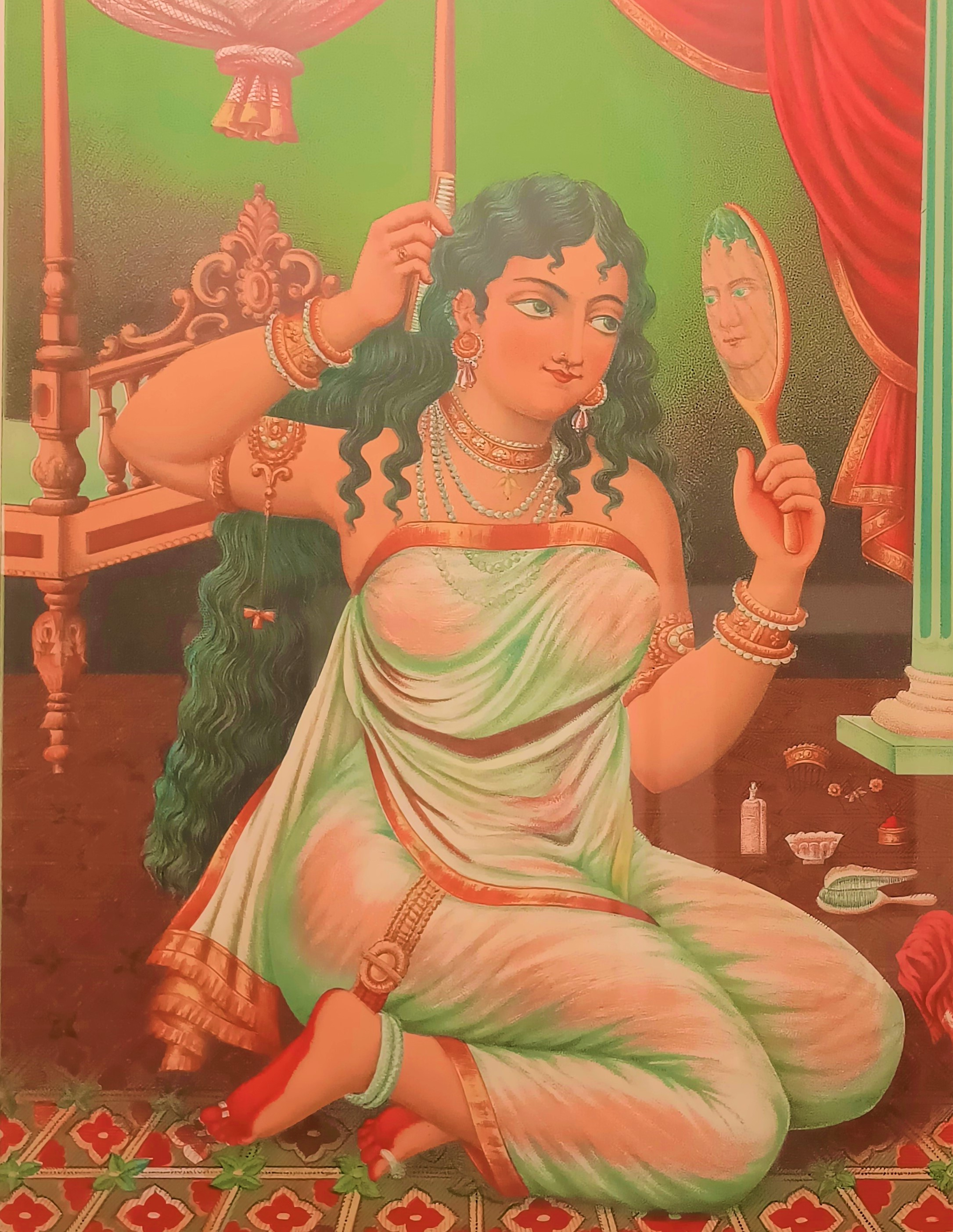
Promoda Sundari, chromolithograph, Chorebagan Art Studio, late 19th century

Sundari paintings or Sundari images are a type of pin-up or erotic art that were popular in 19th-century Calcutta, in the province of Bengal in British India. Mostly sold as prints, the images depict women, particularly the new class of widows who took up sex work to survive, and are valuable references to understand the position of women in a society that was undergoing drastic shifts.

Each Sundari, literally meaning 'beautiful woman', had a peculiar characteristic, such as playing the tabla, preparing paan, tuning the violin, or posing enticingly with roses. Sundari images depict 19th-century Bengali woman who had to occupy the conflicted identity position of the widow and the courtesan, owing to the series of socio-political disruptions happening during the period. The paintings provide a commentary on the larger social phenomenon of widowhood, that forced women into prostitution, which became prevalent during the nineteenth and twentieth centuries in Bengal post the abolition of sati.

== Form and style ==
Sundari paintings were usually sold as chromolithograph prints, or watercolour pats, and even oil paintings. They were produced by popular art studios set up during the 1890s, such as the Chorebagan Art Studio, the Kansaripara Art Studio, etc. The art studios inherited the style of Kalighat painting that portrayed a wide variety of subjects, including modern day scandals, the babus and bibis, etc. These paintings were in direct contrast with the religious oil paintings and prints that were being produced around the same time. The religious paintings were placed in temple rooms, mansions and respectable homes, while erotica paintings of Sundaris decorated the private quarters, dancing room of the babus, or the dancing parlours. In most of these paintings, the Sundaris were depicted draped in the widow's garment, the typical white saree. These women were akin to the Mughal courtesans or tawaifs. The paintings served as pin-ups for the gentry class. However, they have a dark history.

== History ==
Reformers like Ram Mohan Roy and Ishwar Chandra Vidyasagar championed the cause of women's rights in Bengal, heralding some of the most transformative changes at the turn of the century. Sati was abolished, widow remarriage was promoted, and child marriage was restrained in an attempt to end polygamy. However, orthodox and upper-caste families refused to accept these changes. After the abolition of sati, the Kulin (upper-class Brahmin) families, unable to accept the widows, abandoned them as liabilities, forcing them to work as prostitutes, or migrate to Brindavan, the refuge for widows. Since the widows were rejected by their families, prostitution became a way of survival.

Sumanta Banerjee highlights how the "first generation of prostitutes on the colonial world of market economy of 19th-century Bengal" included most significantly the widows from Kulin, besides women who were raped, abducted, struck by famine, or abject poverty." This is corroborated by Alexander Mackenzie's account. A British civil servant, Mackenzie informed in a letter to H. L. Dampier, the Official Secretary to the Government of India in 1892, that “In Bengal, the prostitute class seems to be chiefly recruited from the ranks of Hindu widows.” Usha Chakraborty, in her book Condition of Bengali Women around the 2nd Half of the 19th Century cites a survey report of 1850s. According to the report, out of 12,000 women working as sex workers in Kolkata during the time, 10,000 were Hindu widows. Most of them hailed from Kulin Brahmin families.

While the legal prohibitions against sati, and child marriage, saved the women from death, social dignity was still a long way to come – in this sense, the women were caught between conflicted positions of identity, and disjunct worlds of the past, present and future. The women remain stranded as tradition and modernity clashed. Tapati Guha Thakurta noted how this resulted in a “a sharp edge in all cultural expressions” of that period.

According to Shatadeep Maitra, art produced during the 19th century in Calcutta outlined the several changes that were happening due to the colonial influence. Gods and Monsters wearing Oxford shoes, women wearing blouses, changes in the official language policy as English replaced Persian, etc., were documented on the canvas. Similarly, Maitra states how “the end of sati pratha and its social consequences became mixed with popular imagery. Having limited or no education, many women whose husbands had died had to rely on sex work for survival.” The Sundari paintings were produced as a result.

The images served as pin-ups, but also involved voyeuristic dynamics as the women were shown wearing translucent saris. The paintings provided an entry point into the "sanctum sanctorum of a woman's home".

Noting the problem of sati, in his 1916 Columbia University thesis, B. R. Ambedkar wrote: "Sati, enforced widowhood, and girl marriage are customs that were primarily intended to solve the problem of the surplus man and surplus woman in a caste and to maintain its endogamy ... Burning the widow eliminates all the three evils that a surplus woman is fraught with. Being dead and gone, she creates no problem of remarriage either inside or outside the caste."

== Types ==
=== Pramoda Sundari ===
Pramoda Sundari images depict a woman sitting with several grooming products, brushing her hair while holding a mirror before her face. The paintings show an objectified representation of women engaged in self-care.

=== Anuragini ===
This is an example of a later Sundari iconography. The images depicting Anuragini, which means 'piety' in Bengali, show mature iconography. Her red saree connotes fertility, typically a power reserved for gods. In the backdrop, often other images are included hinting at mixed connotations. For instance, in a version produced by the Kansaripara Studio, there is a sculpture showing a goose being choked by an angel, in the background. This is a conventional Greco-Egyptian metaphor of the victory of good over evil. The same painting also subtly indicates that it is midnight on the cuckoo-clock, alluding to sexual meanings.

=== Bibi ===
The Bibi, referring to a married woman, formed another category of popular erotic art. Bibi was usually posed like the woman in the Pramoda Sundari prints, and her marital status was clearly indicated by the mark of vermillion on her forehead. The woman depicted is clearly objectified as a flirtatious lady desirable to all men around her.

=== Golap and Paan Sundari ===
In Golap Sundari paintings, a woman was depicted holding a golap, or rose in Bengali, and posing licentiously, attracting her lover. Paan Sundari paintings was of a subtler idiom, but also had with sexual connotations. The latter depicted a woman preparing a betel-leaf, or paan, often known for its aphrodisiac quality. The Paan Sundari image was also refined later by the Kansaripara Art Studio in what was called the Kumada Sundari paintings showing a bejewelled woman preparing a paan, probably for herself, or perhaps for her client. In a variant of a Golap Sundari painting, two women are portrayed sharing a rose – the flower here stands clearly as a metaphor for the lover. The sarees of the two women are painted in a way so as to present an illusion of them sharing a single piece of clothing.

=== Manada Sundari ===
Manada Sundari prints were produced by the Kamarpara Art Studio. Similar to other Sundaris represented with musical instruments, the Manada figure sketch initially was drawn with an oval face that was gradually refined in later stages. The instruments such as the violin are shown proportionally bigger in size. The background too features prominently in these prints: ranging from carpeted flooring, to textured patterns, and marbled skirting. The prints were based on illustrations made by different artists of the Studio.

=== Nalini Sundari ===
A Nalini Sundari, usually shown wearing expensive jewellery and ghungroo on her right foot, is depicted playing a bayan tabla, a percussion instrument. She is categorised as one of the Sundaris associated with musical instruments. The objectification of her image is closely comparable to the Mughal tawaifs or courtesans. Her translucent white saree with a black border corroborates the fact, merging in her identity both traces of a widow and a courtesan.

== Gallery ==
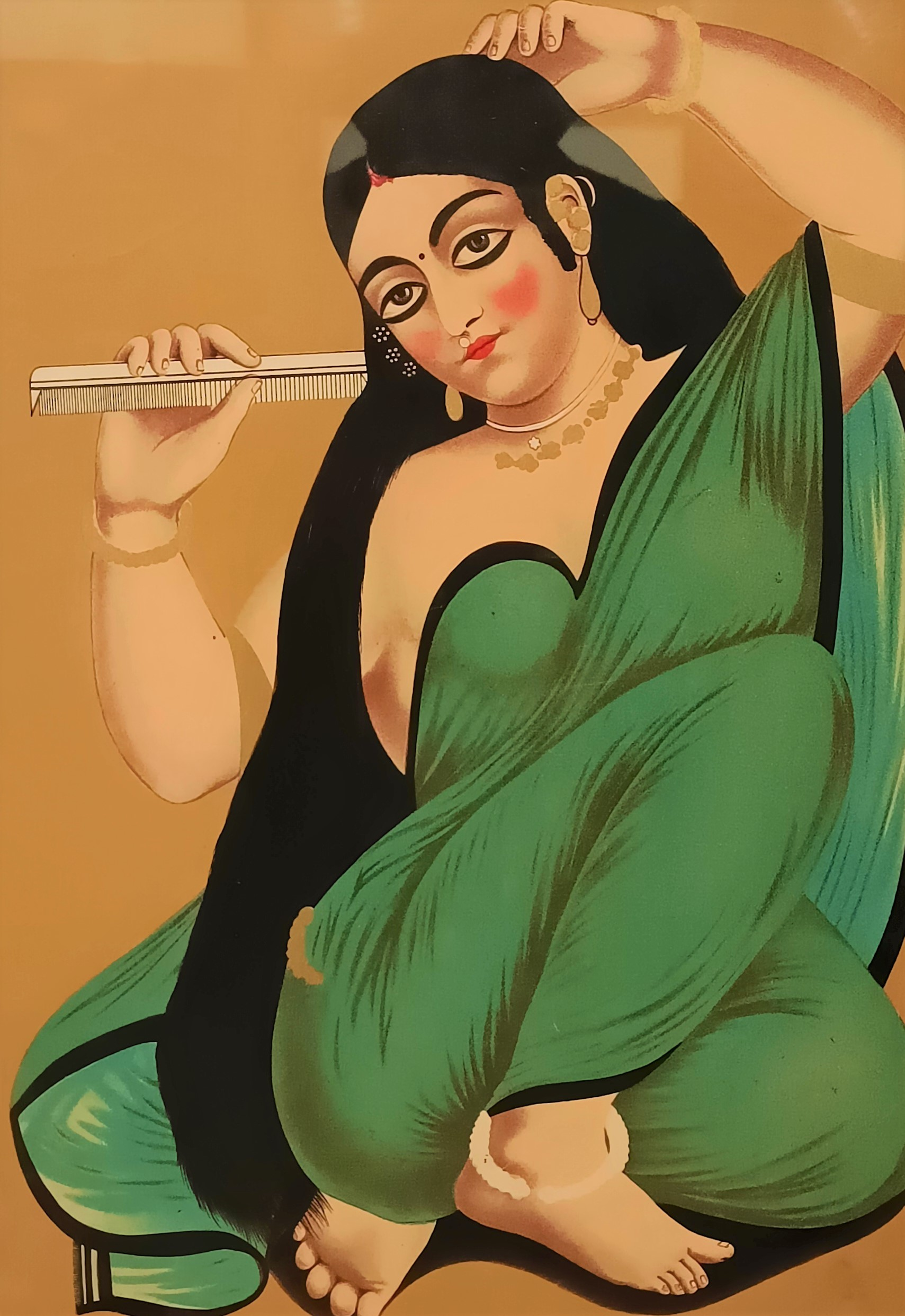
Bibi, chromolithograph on paper, late 19th or early 20th century

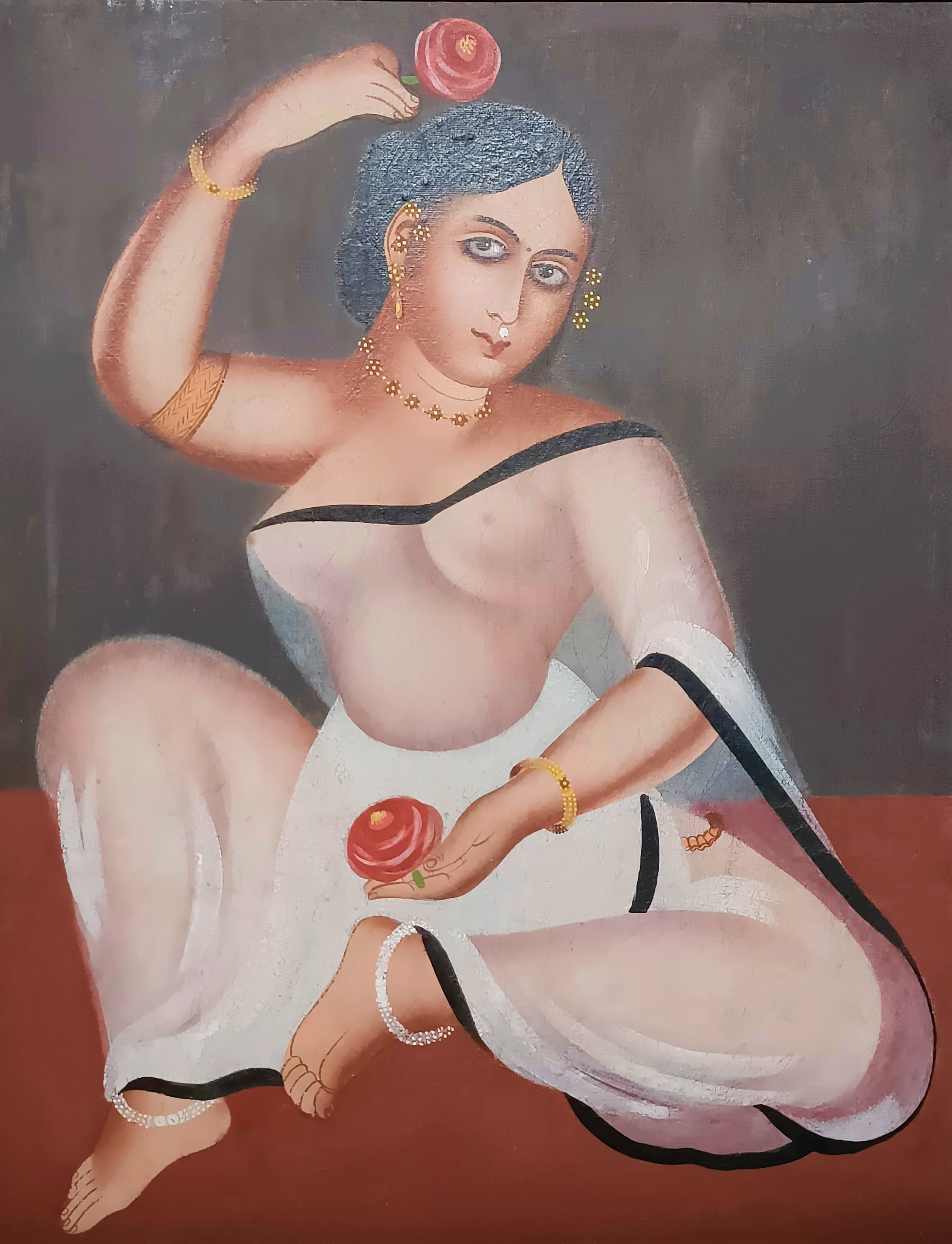
Golap Sundari, oil on canvas, late 19th century

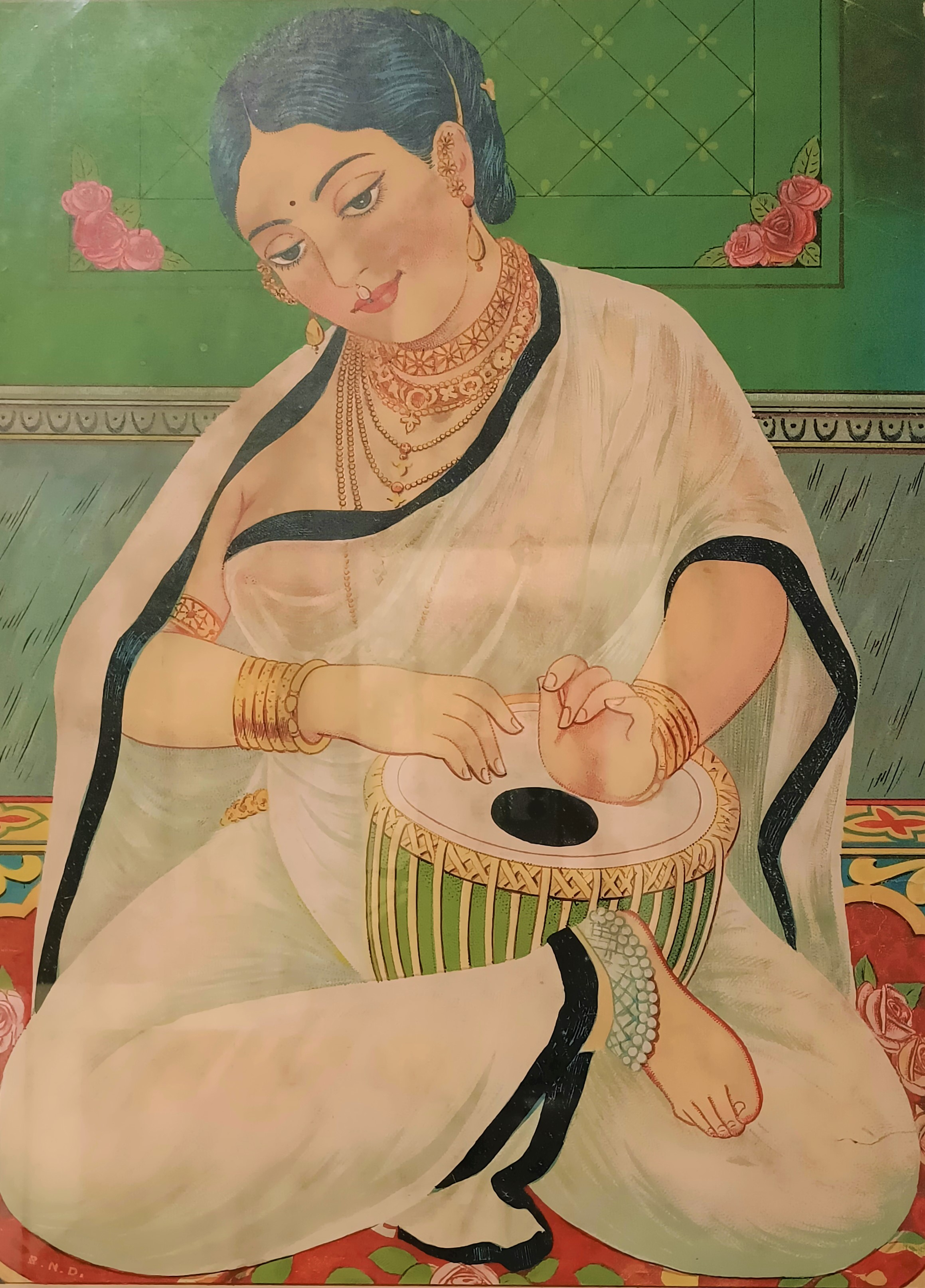
Nalini Sundari, Kansaripara Art Studio, late 19th century

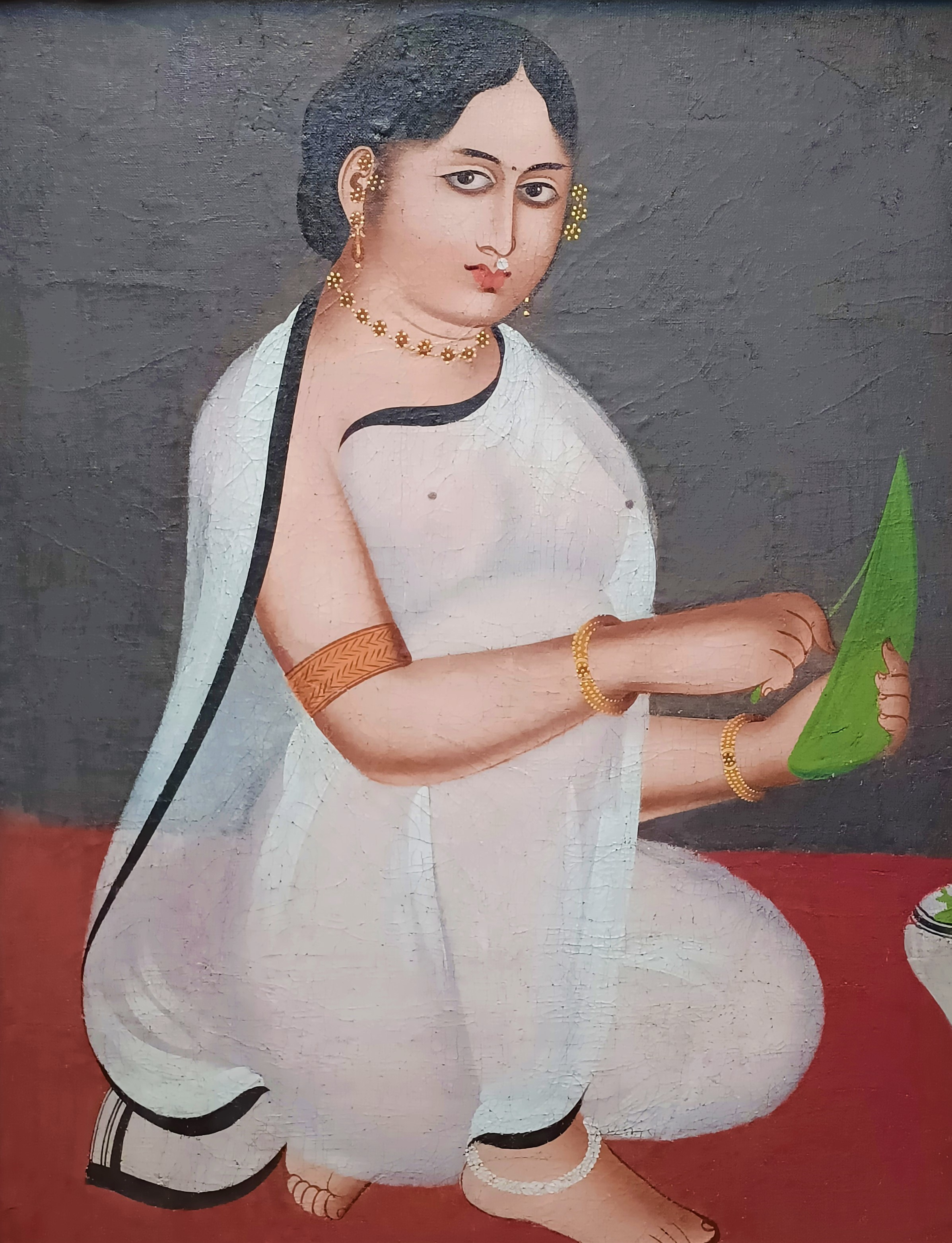
Paan Sundari, oil on canvas, late 19th century

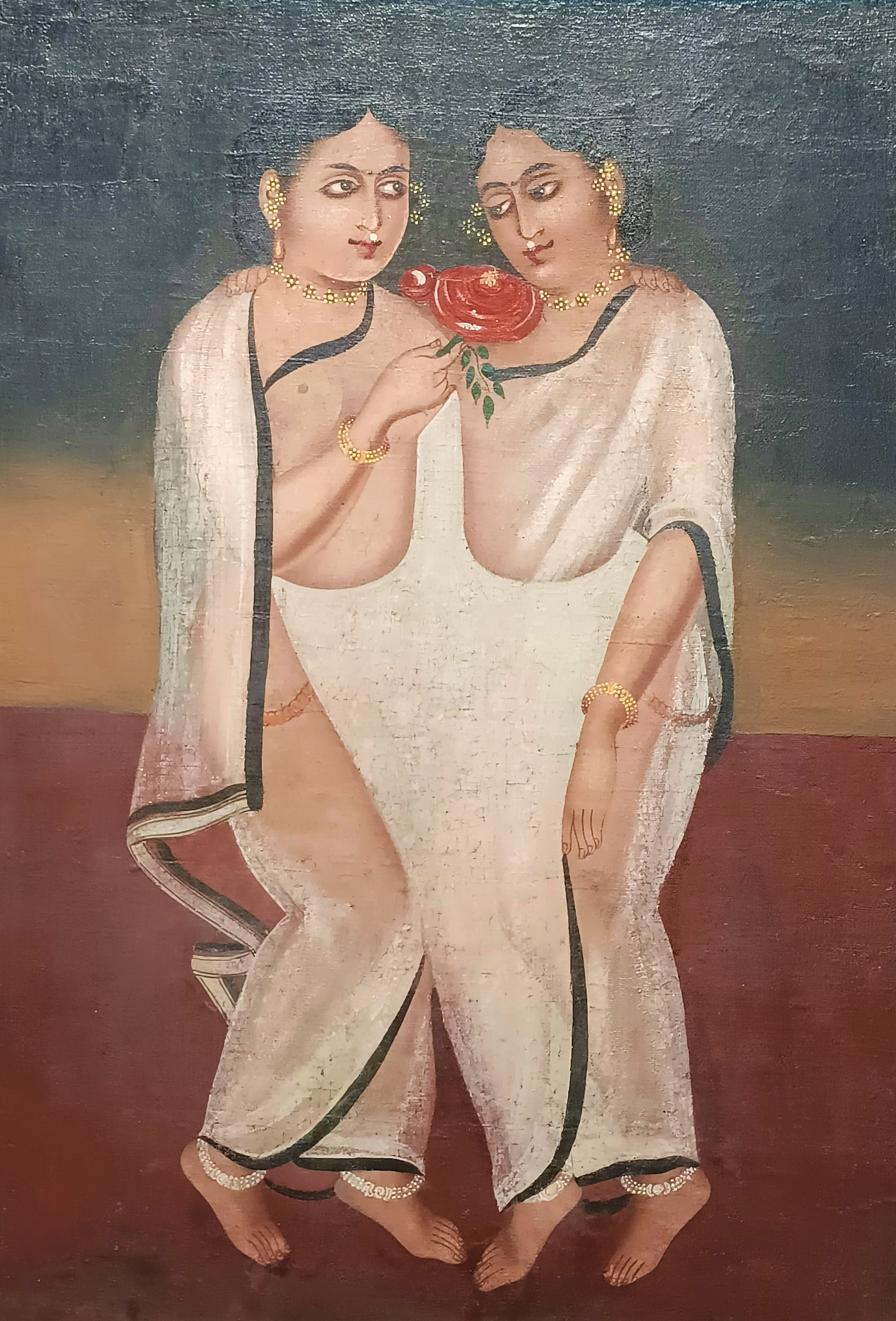
Sundaris sharing a rose, oil on canvas, late 19th century

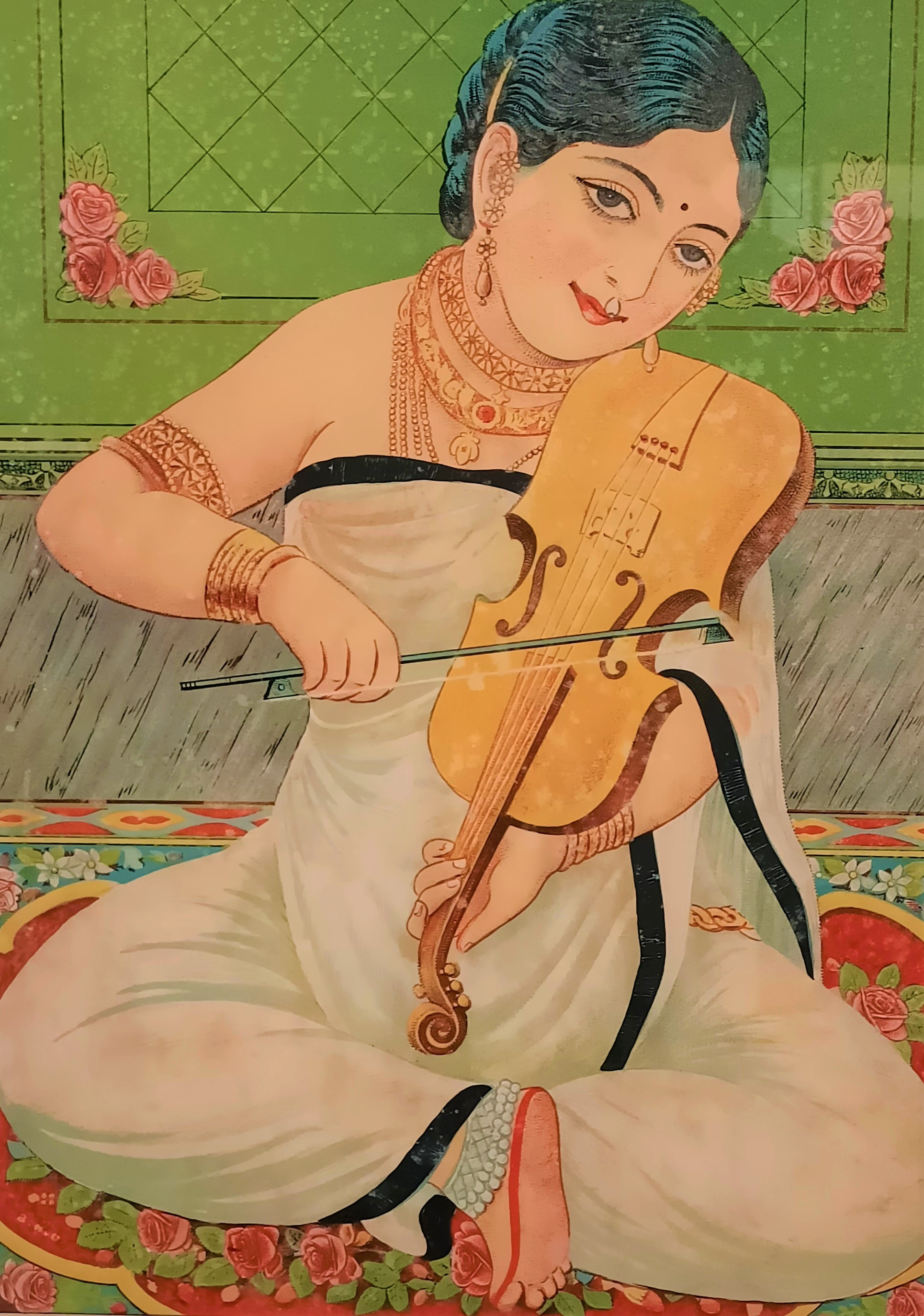
Manada Sundari, chromolithograph by Kansaripara Art Studio, late 19th century
