= Param (given name) =

Param is a masculine given name and nickname which may refer to:

== Given name ==
- Param Nath Bhaduri (1908–1992), Indian Bengali agricultural scientist
- Param Cumaraswamy, Malaysian lawyer
- Param Gill, American 21st century film director and screenwriter
- Param Jaggi (born 1994), American inventor and entrepreneur
- Param Singh (actor) (born 1988), Indian actor
- Param Singh (consultant), British 21st century entrepreneur and community activist
- Param Bir Singh, Indian former police officer, former Police Commissioner of Mumbai and Director General of the Maharashtra Home Guard, a fugitive from extortion charges
- Param Uppal (born 1998), Australian cricketer

== Nickname ==
- Parameswaran Iyer (born 1959), Indian civil servant and former CEO
