= Machali (tigress) =

Bengal tigress (1997–2016)

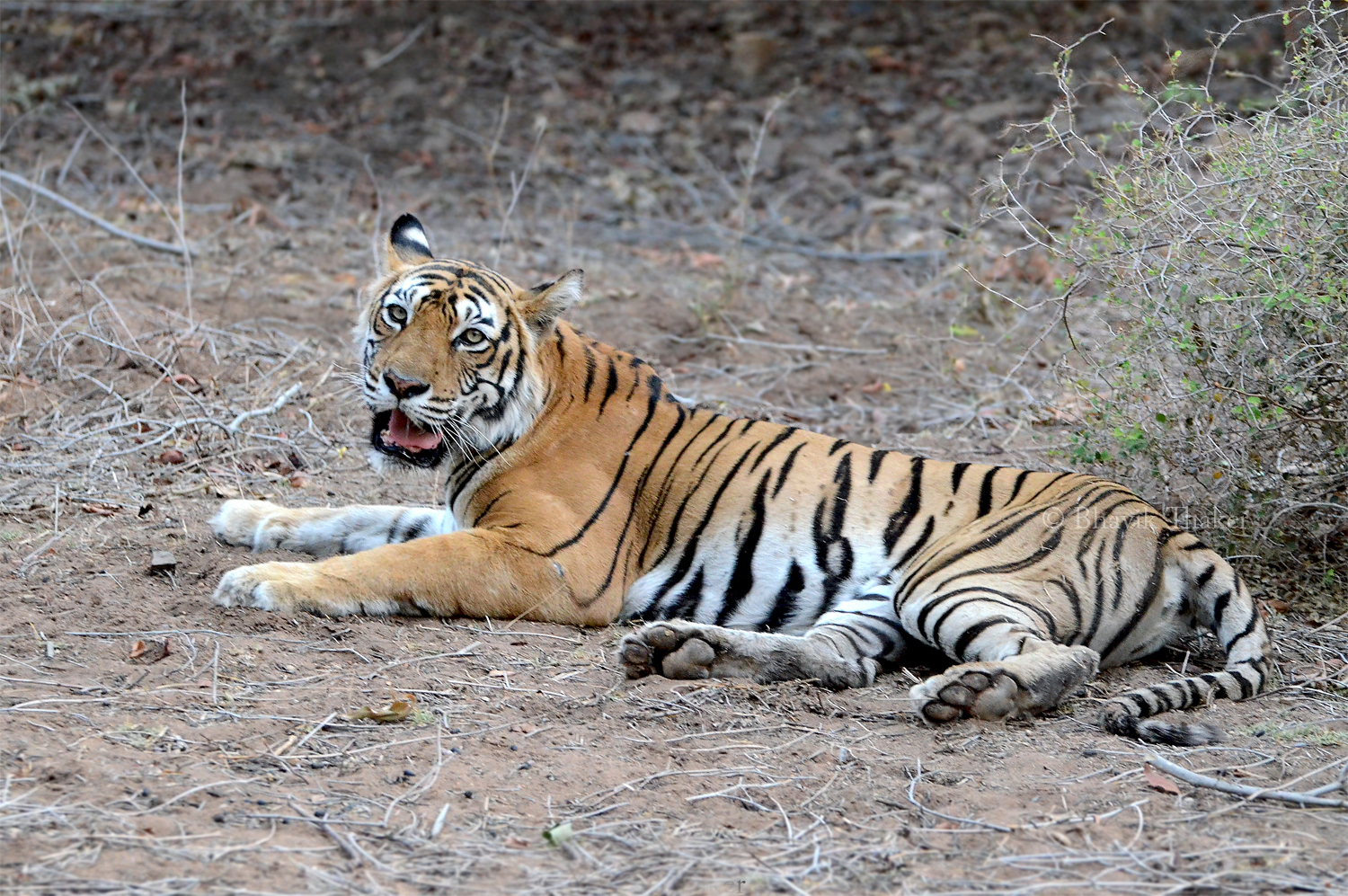
- Machali in Ranthambore National Park
- Other name: T-16
- Species: Bengal tiger (Panthera tigris tigris)
- Sex: Female
- Born: 1997 c. Sawai Madhopur, India
- Died: August 18, 2016 (aged 19); Sawai Madhopur, India
- Known for: India's most famous tigress; considered to have been the most photographed tigress in the world
- Title: Queen Mother of Tigers; Tigress Queen of Ranthambore; The Lady of the Lakes; Crocodile Killer
- Owner: Ranthambore National Park
- Parent: Machali I
- Offspring: 11
- Appearance: See In the media
- Named after: Machali I

Machali (Hindi for 'fish'; code name: T-16), also known as Machli or Machhli, was a Bengal tigress who lived in Ranthambore National Park in India. She was born in the spring of 1997, and died on 18 August 2016.

Machali played a key role in the regeneration of the tiger population in the park in the early 2000s, and was celebrated with titles such as Queen Mother of Tigers, Tigress Queen of Ranthambore, Lady of the Lakes, and Crocodile Killer. She was considered India's most famous tigress and, before her death, the oldest living in the wild.

India earned about US$10 million per year due to tourists attracted to Machali. She won the "Lifetime Achievement Award" of Travel Operators For Tigers due to her contribution to conservation and as a tourist attraction that earned significant income for India.

== Life ==
Machali was born in the spring of 1997, and was the dominant cub in a litter of three females. She inherited her name from her mother, Machali I, who was also named after the Hindi word for 'fish' due to a fish-shaped mark on her face. In her first two years, she started hunting on her own and took over a part of her mother's territory.

Tigresses generally have two or three litters. Over seven years, from 1999 to 2006, Machali had five litters comprising eleven cubs – seven daughters and four sons. Machali's offspring increased the tiger population in the park significantly – from 15 tigers in 2004, to 50 tigers in 2014. Eventually, more than half of the tigers in the park were of her lineage. In 2008, two of her female cubs were relocated to Sariska Tiger Reserve and successfully boosted the tiger population in that park as well.

In early 2014, Machali disappeared from her usual area, sparking a search by over 200 park staff. She was sighted after about a month, and appeared to be in good health. She had survived in dense forest by hunting her own prey, despite having been fed by park staff prior to her disappearance.

She was known for her hunting skill and strength, in particular in an incident in 2003 when she fought with and killed a mugger crocodile. As a result of the fight, she lost two canine teeth. She was also known for her ferocity in protecting her cubs from threats such as male tigers and other animals.

=== Recognition ===
India earned about US$10 million per year due to tourists attracted by the tigress. She won the "Lifetime Achievement Award" of Travel Operators For Tigers due to her contribution to conservation and as a tourist attraction that earned significant income for India.

In 2013, the Indian government issued a commemorative postal cover and stamp to honour the tigress for her ecological and economical contributions.

=== In the media ===
Machali is considered to have been the most photographed tigress in the world. She was featured in a number of wildlife documentaries, including a 50-minute documentary about her life, titled Tiger Queen, which was aired on the National Geographic and Animal Planet channels. In 2012, the story of Machali was aired on the BBC's Natural World in an episode titled "Queen of Tigers: Natural World Special".

=== Later years and death ===
As a result of her age, Machali lost almost all of her teeth, sight in one eye and much of her strength in her later years. She also lost her territory, as her daughter Sundari, born in her last litter, drove her out of her turf. As she was unable to hunt and kill for herself, park staff provided her with food. This intervention became somewhat controversial; tiger expert K. Ullas Karanth commented that it resulted in Machali living longer than she should have, and that truly wild animals should be born, live and die naturally.

In August 2016 Machali became critically ill. Due to her great age, it was considered risky for Ranthambore's rangers and staff to treat and aid her as the medications needed could be harmful or fatal. She died on 18 August 2016. She was 19 years old, older than the average 12 year lifespan of tigers in the wild. She was cremated in accordance with traditional Hindu rituals in a public ceremony.

The last few years of Machali's life were captured on film by wildlife filmmaker S. Nallamuthu. Titled 'The World's Most Famous Tiger', the film contains a two-minute showdown between Machali and her daughter Sundari that ends with the former losing control of the Ranthambore Fort and the unusual instance of a former mate joining her in what seemed an act of companionship.

== Phylogeny ==
The cladogram below shows the phylogeny (progeny or offspring) of Machali with code names and/or nicknames. From 1999 to 2006, she gave birth to at least eleven cubs.

- Machali
  - Male X
    - ST2 (female)
    - ST3 (female)
  - Bamboo Ram
    - Slant Ear – T0 (male)
    - Broken Tail (male)
  - Nick Ear
    - Jhumari (female)
    - Jhumaroo (male)
  - Male X
    - Bubbly – T1 (female)
    - Bunty – T3 (male)
  - Male X
    - Satra/Sundari – T17 (female)
    - Athara/Baghani – T18 (female)
    - Unnis/Krishna – T19 (female)
