= Tripuri games and sports =

The Tripuri community has its own traditional sports, which are called Thwngmung in the Kokborok, the Tripuri language. In recent years these traditional sports are being gradually abandoned as more people become attracted to modern games and sports, but some of the sports are still played today and preferred in rural Tripura. Some of these sports are listed below.

== Achugwi Phan Sohlaimung ==
This is a type of wrestling, played between two young men to test their strength. The players sit on the ground facing each other and spread their legs. A thin tree or bamboo pole is placed between them for staking their legs. The two contenders hold horizontally a piece of bamboo, approximately two and half cubits in length, which remains high above the ground between them. When pulling begins, each contender tries to pull the bamboo towards his own side.

== Bumanikotor ==
Bumanikotor is a type of hide and seek game, played in two groups. While one group hides, the other tries to find the hidden group.

== Dwkhwi Sotonmung ==
This is a form of tug of war played between two groups of boys or men.

== Phan Sohlaimung ==
In this game, the players stand at a specific distance from each other, and a mark is put in the middle. The players place the ends of a bamboo pole under their right armpits, and each participant grasps the pole firmly with both hands. Both the players then try to cross over the mark between them by pushing each other back.

== Kaldong or Kadong ==
A small foot step is tied on two pieces of bamboo about two feet above ground level. The player walks on this foot step. Players compete over things like the ability to run faster or remain on the kaldong longer without falling from it.

== Longoi Chokmung ==
This is a swinging game played by Tripuri children. Two long ropes or strong vines are tied to the branch of a tree, and a wooden platform is tied to the lower end to make a seat. Taking turns the children swing while others push him or her. They also sing while swinging.

== Muphuk Sagwnang ==
This game is played to test the strength of a young man. A child clings to the chest of a man whose waist is tied with one end of a rope. Another man holds the other end of the rope and stands behind the first man. As the game begins, the man with the child on his chest ties to move forward while the other who stands back tries to pull his opponent back.

== Musta Seklaio ==
This game is played between two young men to test the strength of each player's grip. A cylindrical section is cut from a bamboo trunk. One person holds the trunk firmly down on the ground. The other grips the trunk just above the first person's hands and tries to snatch it by rotating it.

== Sohlaimmung ==
The Tripuri word sohlaimung literally means wrestling. This is a type of free-hand wrestling with specific rules. Generally one of the senior spectators become the referee.

== Tengdang ==
Tengdang is another popular game in the villages. It is similar to the stick game known as gilli-danda in other regions of India.
