= Sundari (tigress) =

Tiger from India

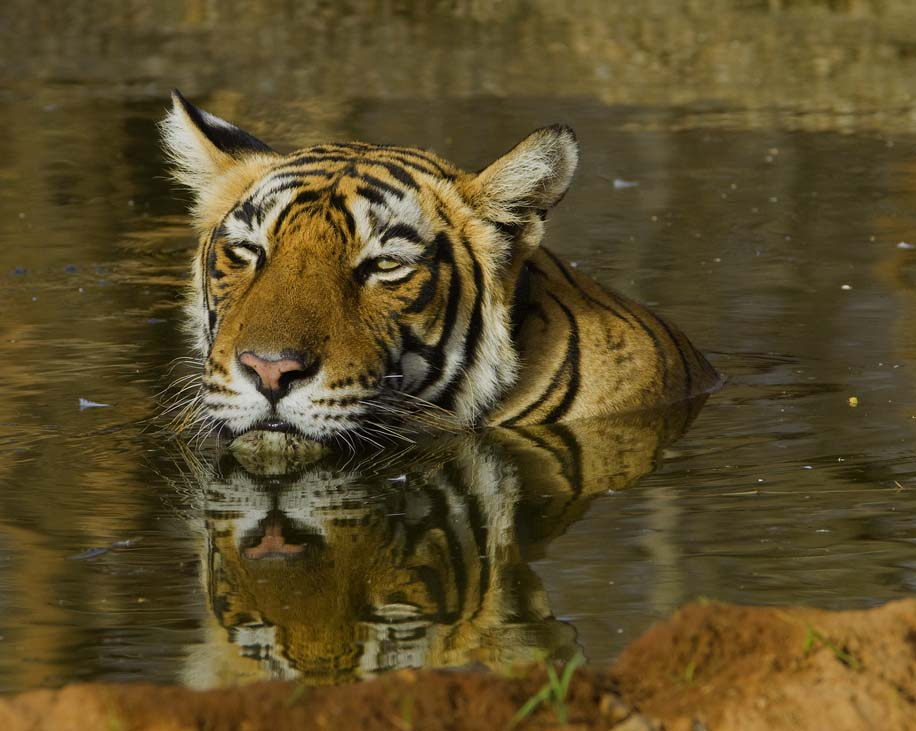
- Sundari bathing in waterhole
- Species: Bengal tiger (Panthera tigris tigris)
- Sex: Female
- Born: 2006; Sawai Madhopur, India
- Owner: Ranthambore National Park
- Parent: Machali
- Offspring: 3

Sundari (Hindi for "beauty"; code name: T-17 c. 2006 – 2013) was a tiger from Ranthambore National Park, India. She was the daughter of Machali and was once considered the main attraction of Ranthambore.

== Life ==
Sundari was born around 2006 in a litter of 3 cubs to Machli, in which she was the most dominant. Between the ages of one and two, she became more independent and separate from her mother and established her own territory.

In 2008 a collar was placed around Sundari's neck but was removed years later in 24 November 2011. Sundari only had one litter, despite her constant courtship with tigers such as T-24, T-25 and T-28. Her litter consisted of 3 cubs; 1 female and 2 males.

Between March and April of 2013, Sundari disappeared and abandoned her 3 rearing cubs. This sparked a search by over 110 forest guards but they still couldn't track her. No sightings occurred despite there being many camera traps and she was declared dead.
