= Mosdeng =

Tripuri food

Mosdeng is a Tripuri food made with chilies.

Mosdeng is a side dish prepared by grinding fresh roasted chilies, salt, and a roasted small, dry, and oil-pasted fish called berma (fermented). The chilies are usually burnt slightly over an open flame to give a smoky flavor. Sometimes, vegetables are added to the dish.
