= Sundari (Malayalam TV series) =

Indian Malayalam television soap opera

- Genre: Soap opera
- Based on: Gopurangal Saivathillai
- Screenplay by: Sinoj Nedungolam
- Directed by: Sudheer Babu; Faisal Adimali / Divyadarshan
- Creative director: Ganesh
- Country of origin: India
- Original language: Malayalam
- No. of seasons: 2
- No. of episodes: 915

Production
- Producers: Prakash C. Menon; E. A Rajendran; Divyadarshan
- Cinematography: Suneesh Palodu/ Prijith
- Editor: Anandhu Sheena/ Amal Sreenu/ Sangeetha Thripalavaloor
- Camera setup: Multi-camera
- Running time: 20-25 minutes
- Production companies: PM Productions; Kalidasa Video Division

Original release
- Network: Surya TV
- Release: 15 November 2021 – 21 July 2024

Related
- Sundari

Sundari is an Indian Malayalam-language soap opera which has two seasons. It airs on Surya TV and digitally through Sun NXT. The show portrays the life of a village belle who faces discrimination and abuse based on skin colour and aspires to assert that character is important than skin colour. The first season aired from 15 November 2021 to 11 February 2024. The second season aired from 12 February 2024 to 21 July 2024. It began as a remake of the Kannada language series Sundari

== Series overview ==
Series	Episodes	Originally released	
Series	Episodes	First released	Last released
1	756	15 November 2021	11 February 2024
2	159	12 February 2024	21 July 2024

== Plot ==
=== Season 1 ===
The plot of the story revolves around a lower middle-class girl, Sundari, who lives in a village and is often judged and treated by other villagers with inequality due to her dark skin tone. She is academically bright and aspires to become an IAS officer. Unfortunately, Sundari's father's close friend whom she considers as her own maternal uncle, Krishnan bring her an alliance in order to protect her name from the villager's accusation that she has eloped with a guy. But in a contradiction, she was admitted in hospital due to an accident while attending her examination.

Sundari's prospective groom is Karthik, Krishnan's brother-in-law, who runs his own advertising agency. Karthik believes that Sundari is not a compatible partner to him and is also in love with another woman named Vaiga, but agrees to the marriage due to his respect for Krishnan. But he does lot of tricks behind his family's back to stop the marriage but eventually fails.

After marriage, Karthik unwillingly brings Sundari with him to the city. Karthik always degrades Sundari's qualification and insults her intelligence without knowing the fact that she's a school and college topper. He thinks she knows nothing about the world as she comes from rural area. Soon Karthik leave Sundari alone and goes to Vaiga and marry her. Few months later, Karthik decides to create one plot to stay with Vaiga forever without any troubles. So he lied to his whole family that he has a dream to earn money working abroad. His friend and elder sister knows the truth, but they agreed to protect Karthik because of his manipulative nature.

Sundari also gets attached to her land lady and her granddaughter who lost her parents at a young age looks up to Sundari as her mother. Few months later, Sundari and Vaiga gets closer after Sundari saves Vaiga's mother, Vaidehi from Asphyxiation after being locked in the car. Vaiga brings Sundari home as a caretaker for her mother who got paralyzed while finding some hunch about Karthik. Vaidehi is always suspicious about Karthik and acts sick to find the truth about him along with Sundari's help. Time passes through like this, Vaiga comes up with job offer for Sundari at her office noticing her intellectual skills and knowledge. Sundari works for Vaiga and has become very close to Vaidehi. She is being lovingly called as Collector Amma by her office colleagues and Vaiga. Karthick does not know that "Collector Amma", who Vaiga always talks about is actually Sundari.

Sundari goes to her IAS coaching classes as well and there she meets a new friend named Siddarth. He is like a well wisher for her and a good friend too. Siddharth is a very kind and helping nature person as he always drops Sundari home and sometimes he motivates her whenever she seems so down.

=== Season 2 ===
Years Later, Sundari became IAS officer and she lives with her grandmother and Mazha. She tries to destroy all inequalities and problems in the society.

== Cast ==
=== Lead ===
- Anjali Vinod (2021-2022) / Mariya Shilji (2022–2024) / Anjali Rao (2024) as Sundari IAS
- Yuva Krishna (2021-2024)/Unnikrishnan (2024) as Karthik
- Sruthika Suresh as Vaiga (2021–2024)

=== Recurring ===
season 2

- Jain as Sarath
- Nihas Khan as Vineeth
- Seema G. Nair as Mallika, Sundari's mother
- Cherthala Lalitha as Eshwari amma, Sundari's grandmother
- Baby Daksha as Mazha, Karthik and Vaiga's daughter adopted by Sundari
- Vishnu K Vijayan as Thangaserry Christy Fernandez
- Kiran as Uthaman Mukhathala
- Ishani as Diana
- Jagan Guruvayoor
- Sajith Sagar
- Godson Saji

Season 1

- Sanif ali as Sidhu
- Rhea George/ Ann Mariya as Vaidehi, Vaiga's mother
- Seema G. Nair as Mallika, Sundari's mother
- Cherthala Lalitha as Achamma, Sundari's grandmother
- Krishnathulasi Bayi as Sreedevi, Karthik's sister
- Devendranath / Dileep Shankar as Krishnan, Karthik's brother-in-law
- Shilpa Martin as Malini, Karthik's niece and Sundari's best friend
- Sachin Joseph as Chotu
- Nihas Khan as Vineeth
- Jolly Easo/Roslin as Janaki
- Shilpa shaji as Malini
- Maya Viswanath
- Maneesh Krishnan as Mike set aju
- Della George as gouri
- Kalabhavan Rahman as kumaran
- Parvathy Rajan Shankarady as Archana
- Arun MJ mohan as unni
- KPAC Rajakumar as Madhavan
- Priya sobha as Laksmi
- Clinton nixon
- Parvathi T.

=== Guest ===
- Santhosh Pandit

== Production ==
Debutant Anjali was cast as the protagonist, while Yuva Krishna played the male lead. Veteran Seema G. Nair was also part of the cast. Anjali was replaced post her marriage. She later accused that she wasn't informed of her replacement and that her remuneration was still pending.

== Soundtrack ==
Original Songs
No.	Title	Length
1.	"Aashamalayerum Cholamalarkatte"	1:48
Total length:		1:48

== Adaptations ==
=== Season 1 ===
Language	Title	Original release	Network(s)	Last aired	Notes	Ref.
Kannada	Sundari ಸುಂದರಿ	11 January 2021	Sun Udaya	12 August 2023	Original	
Tamil	Sundari சுந்தரி	22 February 2021	Sun TV	26 August 2023	Remake	
Bengali	Sundari সুন্দরী	19 July 2021	Sun Bangla	11 June 2023	Remake	
Telugu	Sundari సుందరి	23 August 2021	Sun Gemini	17 August 2024	Remake	
Marathi	Sundari सुंदरी	17 October 2021	Sun Marathi	29 June 2024	Remake	
Malayalam	Sundari സുന്ദരി	15 November 2021	Sun Surya	11 February 2024	Remake	
Hindi	Thodi Si Umeed Thoda Sa Aasmaan थोड़ी सी उम्मीद थोड़ा सा आसमान	6 July 2026	Sun Neo	Ongoing	Remake	

=== Season 2 ===
Language(s)	Title(s)	Original release	Network(s)	Last aired	Notes	Ref.
Tamil	Sundari 2 சுந்தரி	28 August 2023	Sun TV	1 December 2024	Original	
Malayalam	Sundari 2 സുന്ദരി	12 February 2024	Sun Surya	21 July 2024	Remake	
Kannada	Anu Pallavi ಅನು ಪಲ್ಲವಿ	16 February 2025	Sun Udaya	Ongoing	Remake	
