= Sundari (Marathi TV series) =

Indian television series

- Genre: Drama
- Starring: See below
- Theme music composer: Nilesh Moharir
- Opening theme: "Sundari" by Shalmali Sukhtankar
- Country of origin: India
- Original language: Marathi
- No. of episodes: 881

Production
- Producers: Jitendra Gupta; Mahesh Tagde
- Production location: Satara
- Camera setup: Multi-camera
- Running time: 22 minutes
- Production company: Tell-a-Tale Media

Original release
- Network: Sun Marathi
- Release: 17 October 2021 – 29 June 2024

Sundari is an Indian Marathi language television series which aired on Sun Marathi. It starred Aarti Birajdar, Swati Limaye and Karan Bendre in lead roles. It premiered from 17 October 2021 along with 4 new series. It began as a remake of the Kannada series Sundari which aired on Sun Udaya.

== Cast ==
=== Main ===
- Aarti Birajdar as Sundari
- Aashay Kulkarni / Karan Bendre as Aditya
- Swati Limaye as Anu

=== Recurring ===
- Asmita Kale as Shakuntala
- Balkrishna Shinde as Mahadev
- Mrinalini Jawale as Mangal
- Vandana Sardesai as Sudha
- Vanita Kharat as Saheb
- Sanjivani Samel
- Pallavi Patwardhan
- Chhaya Sagaonkar
- Saurabh Chaughule
- Varsha Dandale

=== Cameo appearances ===
- Hardeek Joshi
- Apurva Nemlekar

== Adaptations ==
Language	Title	Original release	Network(s)	Last aired	Notes
Kannada	Sundari ಸುಂದರಿ	11 January 2021	Sun Udaya	12 August 2023	Original
Tamil	Sundari சுந்தரி	22 February 2021	Sun TV	26 August 2023	Remake
Bengali	Sundari সুন্দরী	19 July 2021	Sun Bangla	11 June 2023	Remake
Telugu	Sundari సుందరి	23 August 2021	Sun Gemini	17 August 2024	Remake
Marathi	Sundari सुंदरी	17 October 2021	Sun Marathi	29 June 2024	Remake
Malayalam	Sundari സുന്ദരി	15 November 2021	Sun Surya	21 July 2024	Remake
