= Pusey–Crozier Mill Historic District =

Historic district in Pennsylvania, United States

- U.S. National Register of Historic Places
- U.S. Historic district
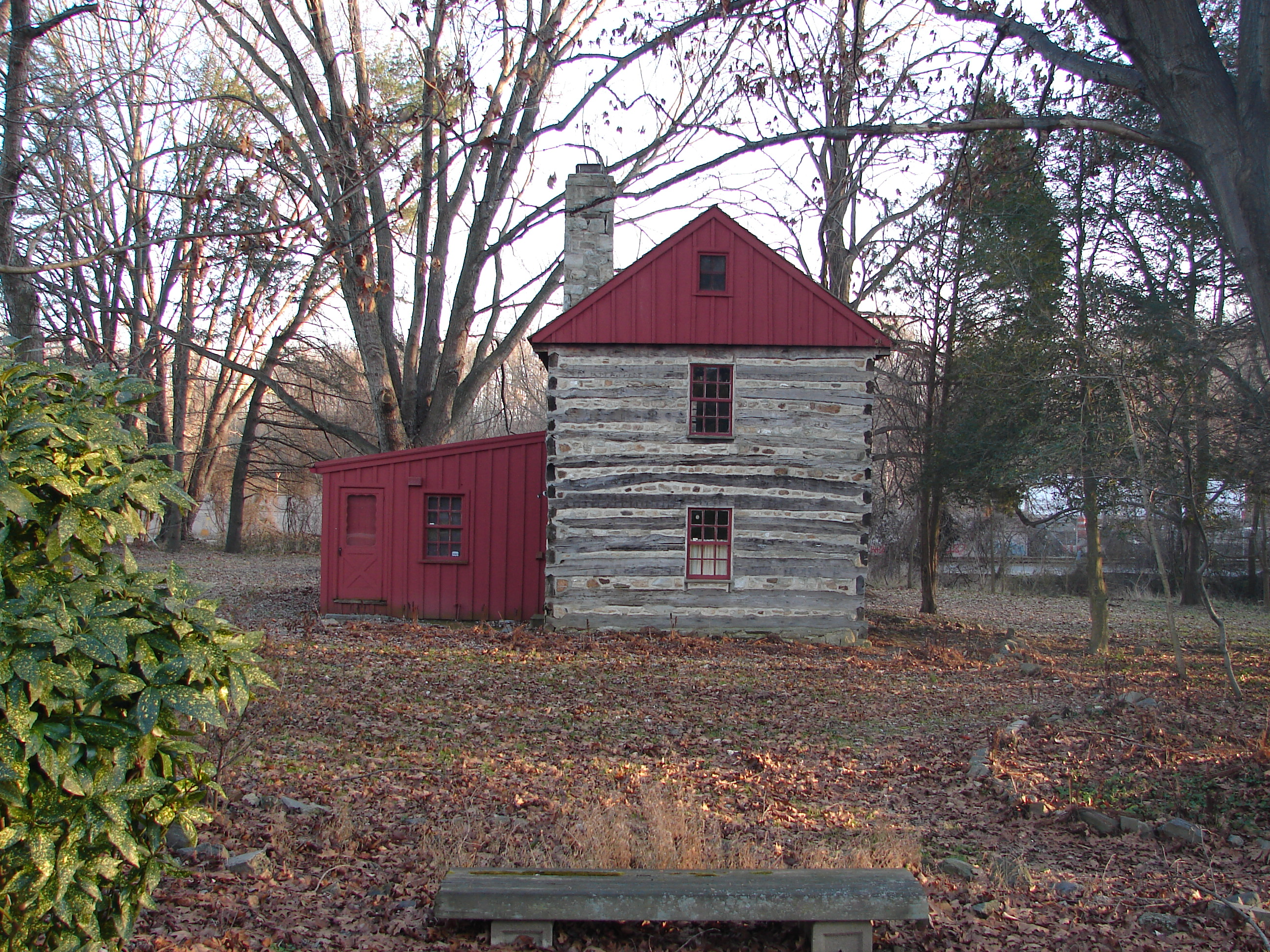
- Pusey–Crozier Mill Historic District, log house - December 2008

- Location within Pennsylvania Location within the United States
- Location: Race St., Upland, Pennsylvania
- Coordinates: 39°51′05″N 75°23′12″W
- Area: 10.5 acres (4.2 ha)
- Built: 1683
- Architectural style: Vernacular Styles
- NRHP reference No.: 76001638
- Added to NRHP: September 27, 1976

The Pusey–Crozier Mill Historic District, also known as the Pusey Plantation and Landingford, is an historic mill complex and national historic district in Upland, Delaware County, Pennsylvania, United States.

It was added to the National Register of Historic Places in 1976.

== History and architectural features ==
This district includes nine contributing buildings, one contributing site, and one contributing structure that are located at the site of the first grist mill and sawmill erected by the English Quakers in 1682. They are the Pennock Log House (1790), a schoolhouse (1849), four single houses (1850), a large double house (1850s), a mid-nineteenth century barn, and the original mill site, headrace, and tail race. The Caleb Pusey House is also located in the district but is listed separately on the register.
