= George K. Crozer Mansion =

Historic house in Pennsylvania, United States

- U.S. National Register of Historic Places
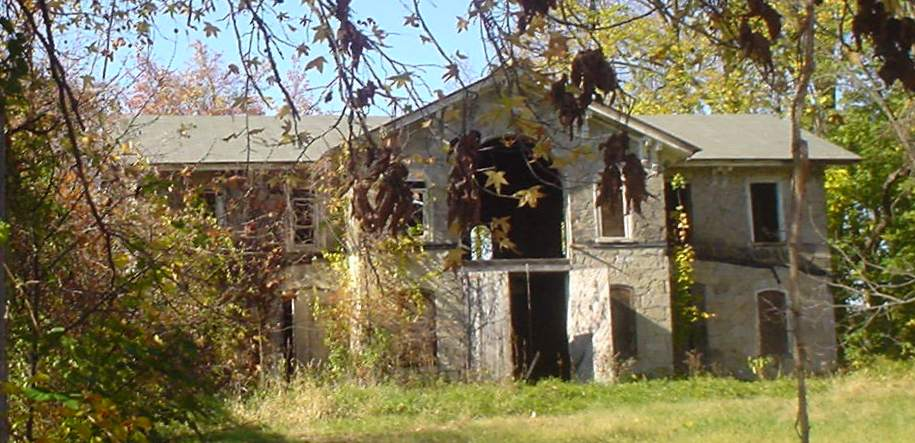
- Outbuilding on George K. Crozer Mansion property, November 2009

- Location within Pennsylvania Location within the United States
- Location: 6th St., Upland, Pennsylvania
- Coordinates: 39°51′19″N 75°23′16″W
- Area: 2 acres (0.81 ha)
- Built: 1869
- Architectural style: Italianate
- NRHP reference No.: 73001625
- Added to NRHP: August 14, 1973

The George K. Crozer Mansion, also known as Netherleigh, was an historic mansion which was located in Upland, Delaware County, Pennsylvania.

It was added to the National Register of Historic Places in 1973.

== History and architectural features ==
Built by George K. Crozer, the son of John Price Crozer, who founded a milling business on nearby Chester Creek, as well as the modern borough of Upland, this Italianate-style mansion, was erected in 1869. Destroyed by fire in June 1990, it was subsequently demolished.
