= Caleb Pusey House =

Historic house in Pennsylvania, United States

- U.S. National Register of Historic Places
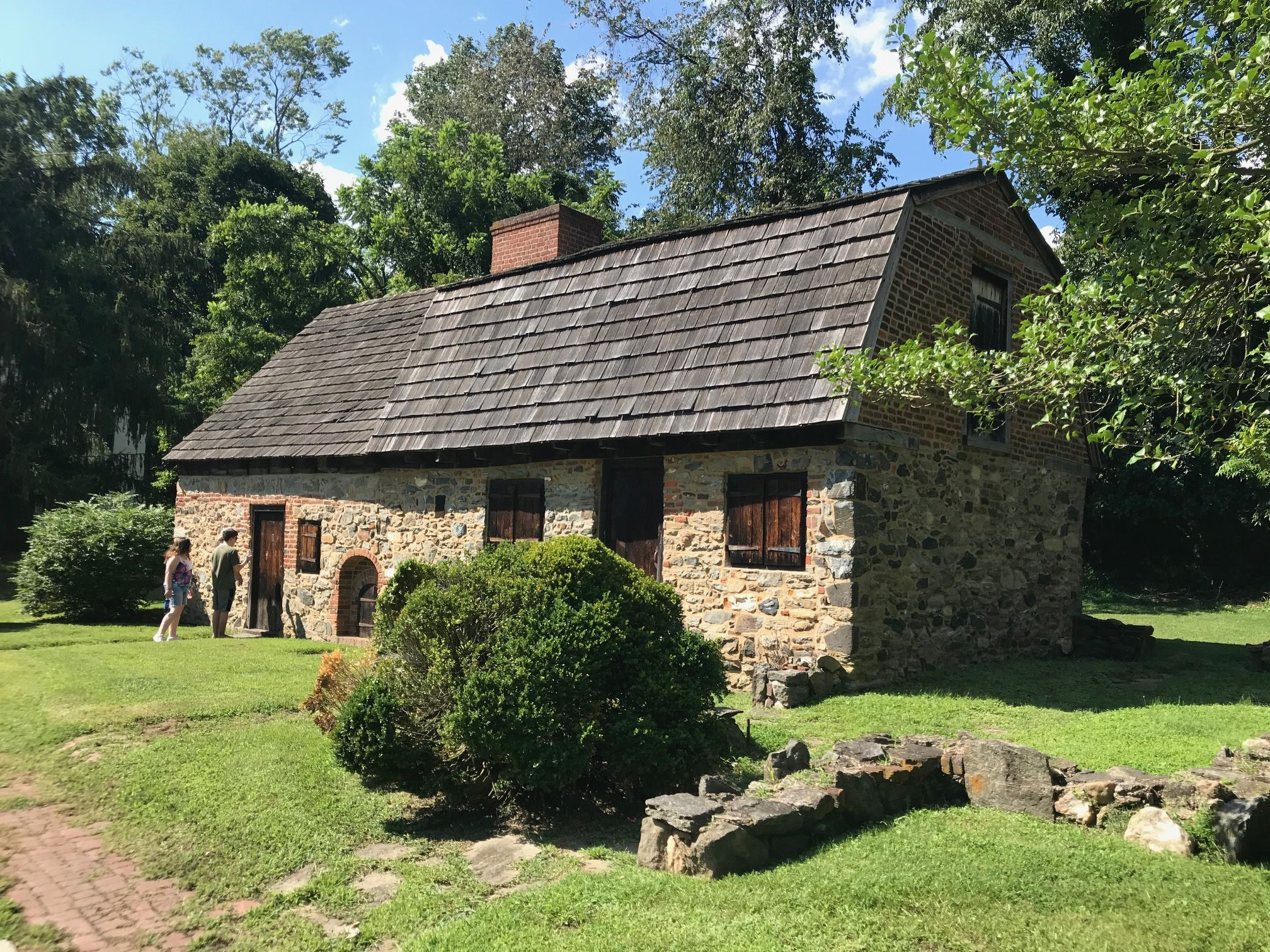
- Viewed from the SE in Aug 2023

- Location within Pennsylvania Location within the United States
- Location: 15 Race St., Upland, Pennsylvania
- Coordinates: 39°51′4″N 75°23′13″W
- Built: 1683
- Architectural style: Vernacular Jacobethan
- NRHP reference No.: 71000706
- Added to NRHP: March 11, 1971

The Caleb Pusey House, built in 1683 near Chester Creek in Upland, Pennsylvania in the United States, is the oldest English-built house in Pennsylvania. It is the only remaining house that William Penn, the founder of Pennsylvania, is known to have visited. Caleb Pusey was a friend and business partner of Penn's. They came over together in 1682 along with prefabricated mills intended for grinding flour and cutting lumber. Pusey served as manager of the mills until his retirement in 1717.

Since about 1960, the building and grounds have been owned by the Friends of the Caleb Pusey House, Inc. The house was in very poor condition, but was restored and the property has since been operated as a historic house museum.

== Caleb Pusey ==
Caleb Pusey was a Quaker last maker (a maker of wooden foot molds for cobblers) and a friend and business partner of William Penn, the founder of the Province of Pennsylvania. A native of the parish of Lambourn, England, Pusey came to Pennsylvania from England in 1682 with his wife, Anne Worley, and her two sons from her first marriage, Francis and Henry. They traveled with Penn on his ship The Welcome, (Note: There is some disagreement as to whether or not Caleb came over on the Welcome. The Welcome Society of Pennsylvania includes Caleb and his wife on their passenger list for the Welcome, while another passenger list does not, and a 1969 article about the Pusey house says that Caleb came slightly earlier to search for a suitable site for the mill.) and brought with them prefabricated grist and saw mills which they planned to erect in the province and Pusey was to be the manager. Many of the passengers were Quakers who were leaving to escape religious persecution. Anne's first husband died while in prison for refusal to attend the Church of England.

The voyage of the Welcome was tragic; there was small pox aboard and 30 of the 100 passengers died. Pusey had 250 acres of land, sold and deeded to him by Penn, which he would use to cultivate crops, 100 acres of which was adjacent to Chester Creek, near the intended site for the mill. It was near the small Swedish settlement of Upland. Pusey's land was called the Landingford Plantation.

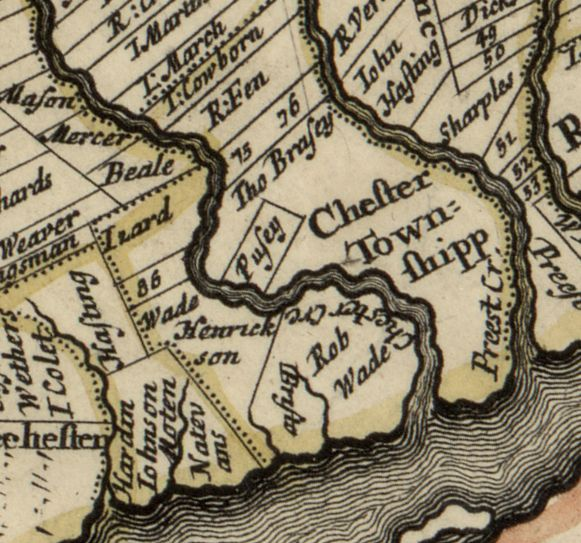
Pusey's land in Thomas Holme's 1687 map. Pusey's land is near center, adjacent to Chester Creek which empties into the Delaware River at the bottom. Note the usage of the long s in Pusey's name.

Pusey served in many official positions at various times. These include Chester County Sheriff, Pennsylvania assemblyman for Chester County, Chester County Tax Collector, and justice of the provincial supreme court. He was also involved with the local Quaker community, and wrote a number of pamphlets, several in defense of William Penn. Pusey retired in 1717, and the Pusey family moved to Marlborough Township, near present day Longwood Gardens, where he died in 1727.

The name Pusey actually refers to a village that was formerly part of Berkshire County, England. It became common practice, in Pusey's time and earlier, to use the place of family origin as a surname. Caleb's father and grandfather both wrote "alias Pusey" following their names when they signed their wills, indicating that they had adopted that name.

== Caleb Pusey House ==
There was not much time between their arrival in 1682 and the onset of winter, and they were only able to complete the construction of a pit-house, which they used as a residence. The pit house was half below ground and half above ground, and was similar to ones built elsewhere in the area. It was common at that time to refer to such a dwelling as a "cave." Pusey's cave had a fireplace, a wooden floor, and one or two small windows. In 1683 the main above-ground house was built using native stone. It was attached to the pit-house, which then became the east wing of the house and came to be used as a workshop. The initial construction of the main house consisted of a single room which had a large attic or loft that was used for storage and sleeping and had a gable roof. There was a fireplace in the western wall which contained a large brick baking oven.

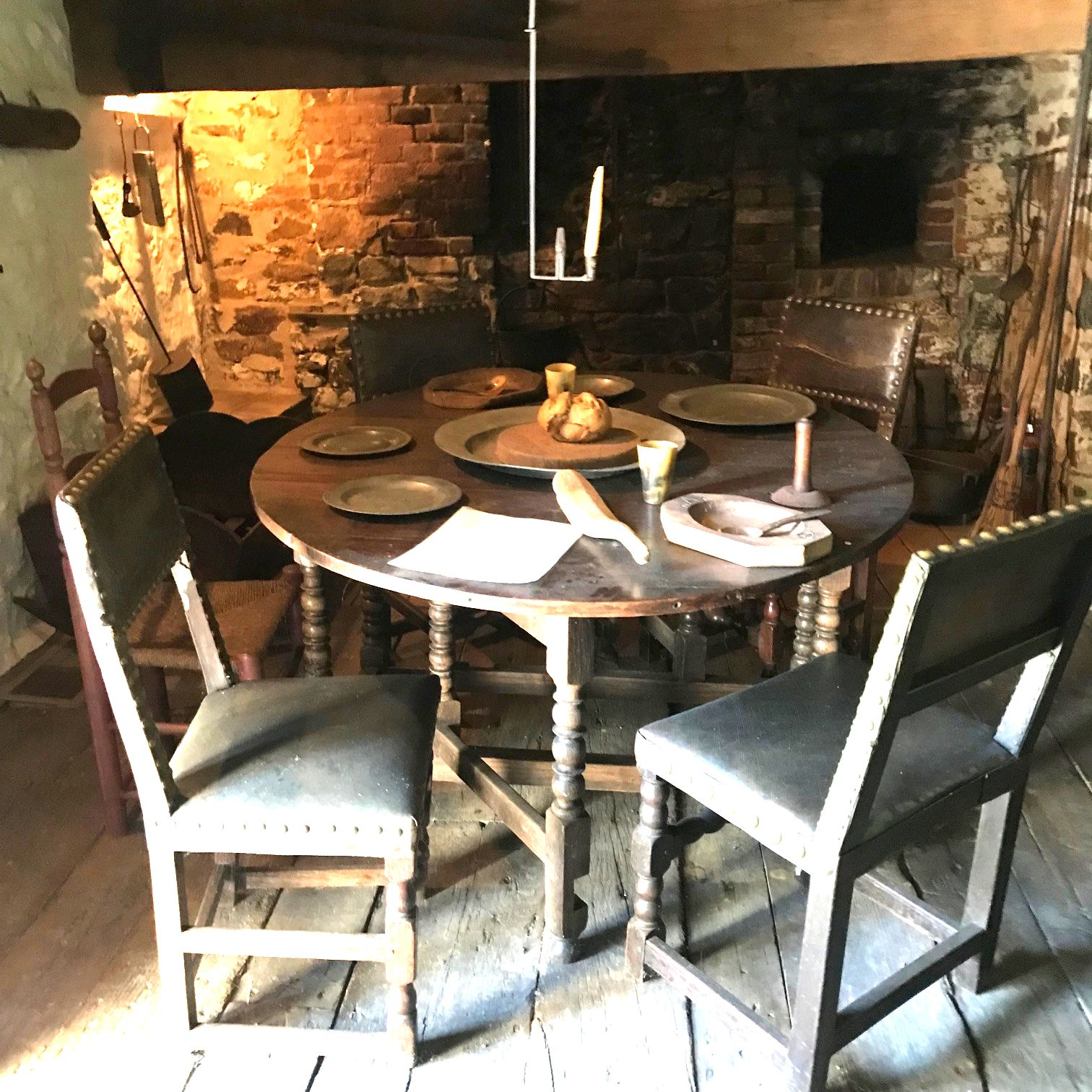
Shows the east room looking west towards the fireplace. The oven is on the right in the fireplace. Period furniture is in the foreground.

At a later (unknown) date, another room was constructed which shared that western wall, so that the chimney was then in the center of the house. The new room is known as the west room, the original above ground room is known as the east room, and the pit-house room is referred to as the east wing.

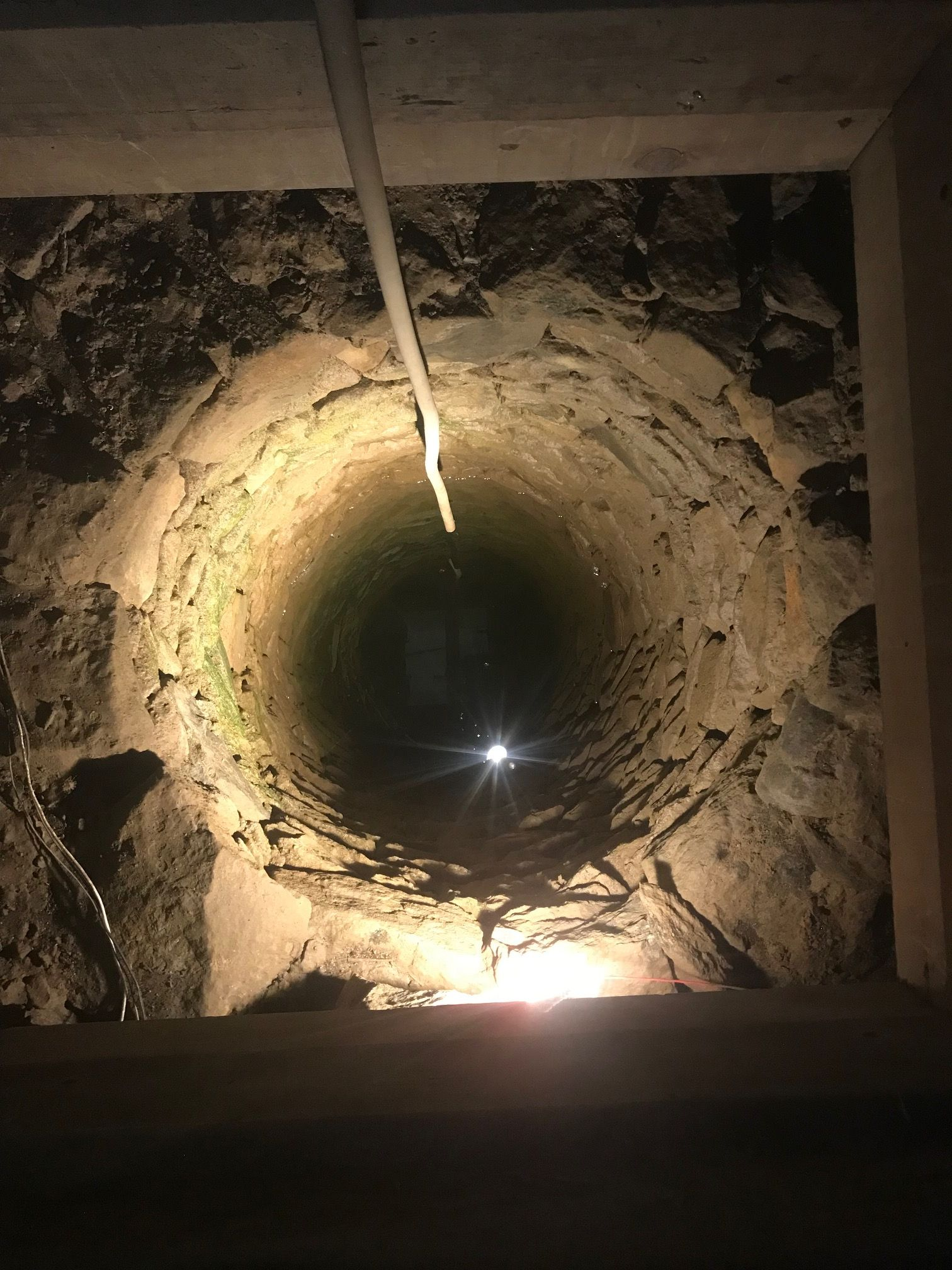
Well inside the west room near SW corner

The west room encloses a well which was previously outside. It also contains a large iron basin called a stand-kettle on the back side of the east room's fireplace. The stand-kettle can be heated from below with a fire, so that it can be used for various purposes such as heating water and scalding poultry. There is a small access door on the front of the house to the space below the stand-kettle where the fire is set. The west room is similar in size to the east room and they initially shared a common roof. The west room did not have its own fireplace.

A couple of theories were put forth regarding time of construction of the west room. There are records from a Quaker friends meeting at the house in 1696, in which men and women were in two separate rooms, suggesting that the west room was in existence at that time. (This argument seems to assume that the pit-house/east wing could not have been the second room.) It's also been suggested that the west room construction was necessitated by the destruction of the east wing in a fire, which likely happened in or after 1723, when Pusey no longer lived there.

After Pusey left in 1717, the Landingford property was owned by a succession of people, including industrialist John Price Crozer. The house was privately owned and occupied until roughly 1950. Around 1752, The roof of the east room was changed from a gable roof to a gambrel roof. The purpose was to increase the usable attic space to accommodate more storage and sleeping space..

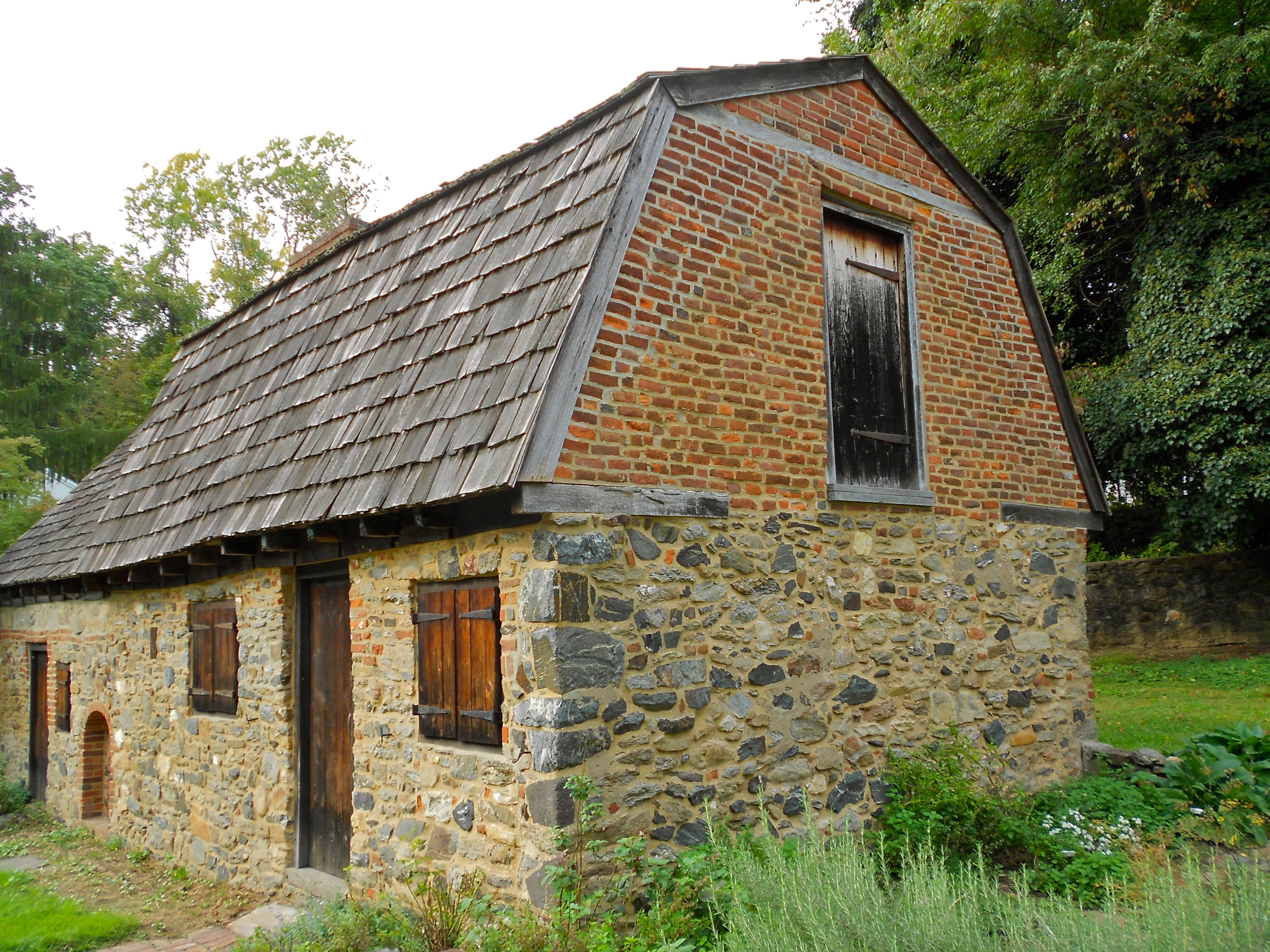
East end of the house, showing the access door to the loft room and the line in the brickwork where the gable roof used to be before it was expanded to a gambrel roof (photo from 2012)

The change in roof style can be seen as a line in the brickwork on the east wall of the house. The chimney of the main house was destroyed in a fire. The date is unknown and it's not clear if this was a different fire than the one that destroyed the east wing. The chimney was rebuilt at the back of the house, rather than the center, and used by two corner fireplaces, one in each room. The house was divided at this time and used by two families. The attic regions were also separate and were accessed by separate spiral staircases. The baking oven was moved outside, as it was considered a fire hazard. The chimney and fireplace were later returned to their original forms and locations during restoration of the house in the 1960s.

The house can be found at 15 Race Street, Upland, Pennsylvania, and is one of the oldest houses in the state. Viewed from Race Street, which runs past the front of the house, the original east room is on the right and the west room is on the left. The partially below-ground east wing was not restored, but would have been found to the right of the east room.

== Excavations ==
Between 1962 and 1970, archaeological excavations were conducted at the Caleb Pusey House. It was discovered early on that there used to be a cellar below the east room of the house which had been filled in and forgotten, probably in 1899 (see foundation drawing).

Foundation of the Caleb Pusey House, as uncovered during excavations in the 1960s. Sketch by George E. Jackson.

This was fortunate from an archaeological perspective because the fill that was used was from a refuse pile containing a vast trove of artifacts that had been discarded over a period of many years. It contained numerous coins, broken pottery and other items of interest. It is thought that this was done because the rear wall was being forced inwards from the force earth behind it and so by filling in the cellar the owners hoped to prevent this problem from getting worse over time. The cellar was completely excavated and is currently (Oct 2023) empty except for a sump pump.

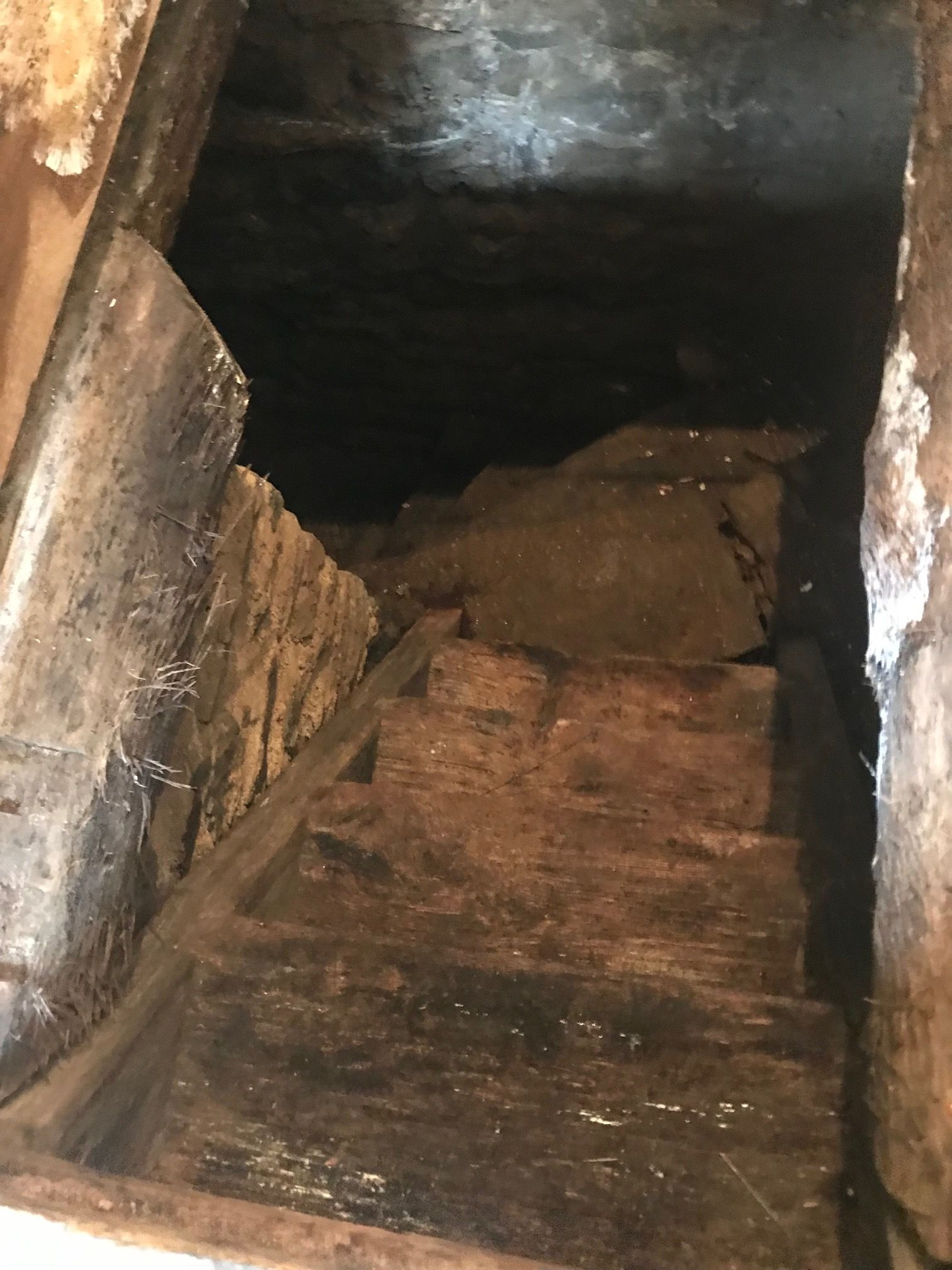
Stairway going down to the cellar below the east room.

It is accessed via a spiral staircase, the lower part of which is stone and original. The stairs are accessed through a door in the floor at the north east corner of the east room.

Another discovery was the buried remains of the cave (or east wing) just to the east of the east room. It extended significantly further in the front than the other rooms and was accessed by a separate entrance with a stairway of 5 or 6 steps going down to the floor which was below ground. In the foundation plan, the steps are in the alcove in the front wall of the east wing, and the fireplace was in the alcove at the right rear. After construction of the main house, this below-ground room came to be used as a workshop for various projects. It was eventually destroyed by a fire and its chimney also collapsed at that time. After this, the pit was filled in so that the remnants of the room were all completely buried and soon forgotten.

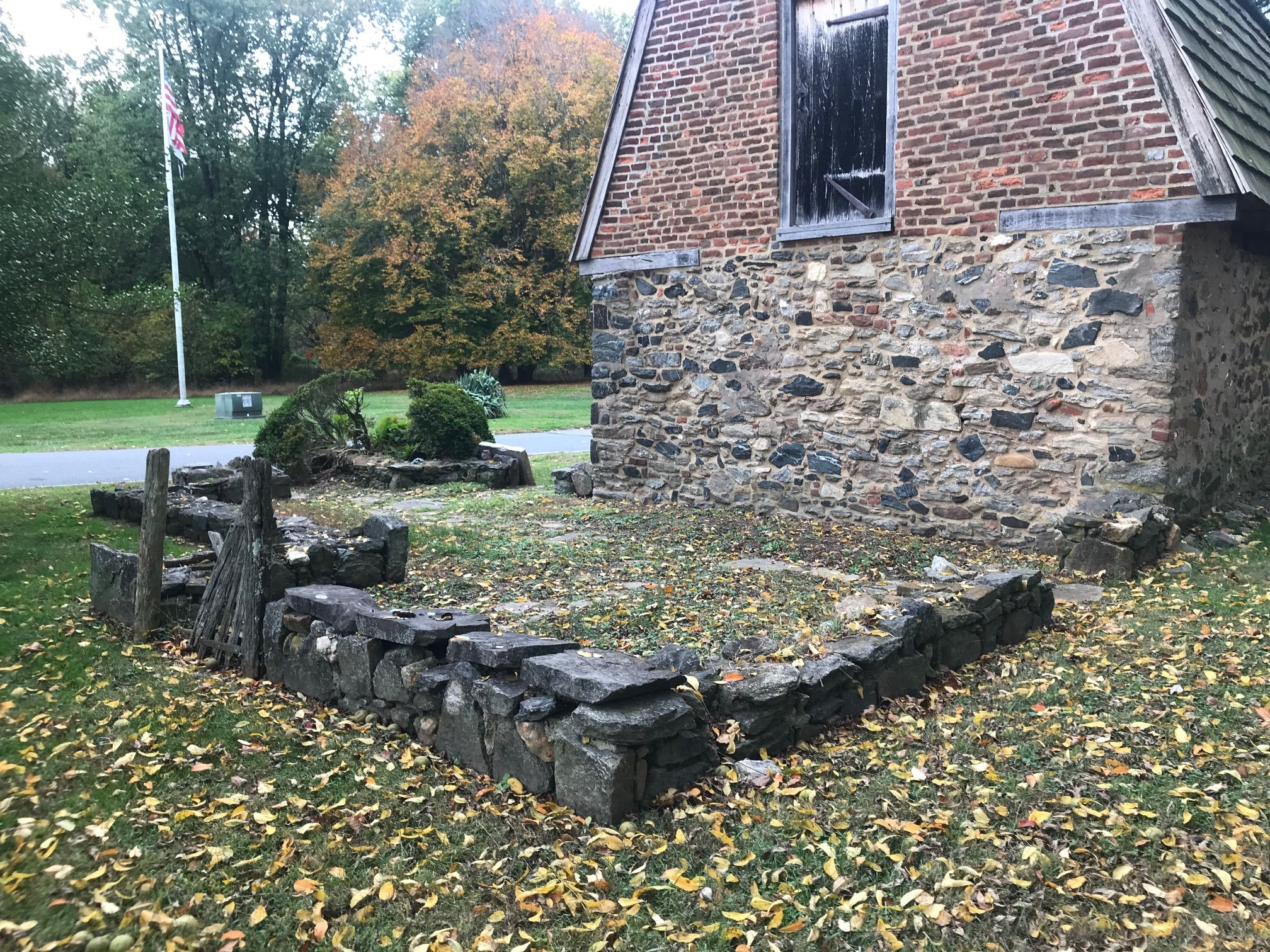
This stone wall marks the outline of the original pit-house or cave that Pusey built in 1682

A coin minted in 1723 was found during the excavation, indicating that the fire likely occurred after that date. Caleb was no longer living there at that time. Also found were glass panes that were lined in lead. Since all lead was collected during the revolutionary war for making bullets, this would suggest that the destruction of the east wing occurred between 1723 and 1776. It has been suggested (though not proven) that the fire was caused by a small copper still, the remains of which were found beneath the collapsed chimney. Presumably either the still itself exploded due to a blockage or ethanol vapors were produced which filled the room and then exploded. If sufficiently violent, such an explosion could have been responsible for the chimney collapse and also the deformation of the eastern wall of the main house. It was decided not to restore the cave, but instead to mark the outline with a low stone wall. The enclosed space has sometimes been used as a garden.

A filled in well was found inside the west room. The fill was carefully removed and the well restored. A newly minted coin from 1699 was found at the bottom, possibly dropped or thrown in by William Penn who returned from England in that year and visited with Pusey in December.

A cooling cellar was discovered in front of the west end of the house. It had been abandoned and filled in, probably sometime during the 1700s. It's labeled "west wing" on the foundation plan.

Artifacts were found from the entire time period that the house was occupied, although a large proportion were from 1752 to 1786. Artifacts include portions of dolls, doll dishes, various lead toys, hand made dominoes, marbles, ceramic material, earthenware, coins, pewter items, brass items, silver items, iron pulley wheel from the well, milk pan, pots, pitchers, knives, and a very large number of pipe stem and bowl fragments.

== Restoration ==
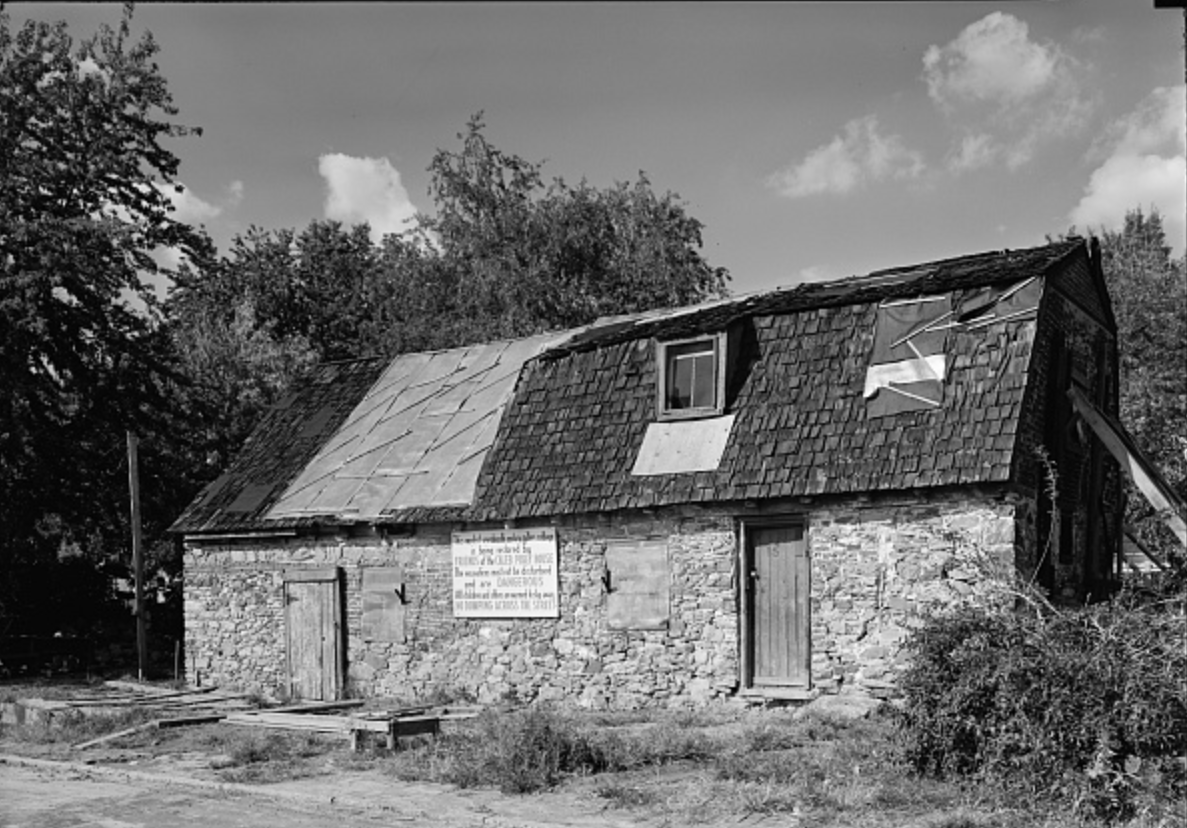
The Caleb Pusey House prior to restoration

By 1960 the house was in a terrible state of repair and possibly in danger of collapse. Funding was sought in order to do a full restoration of the property, much by private donations and matching funds from the government. The property, including the Crozer Schoolhouse next door, was acquired by the Friends of the Caleb Pusey House, Inc. Restoration was carried out in the 1960s, immediately following the archaeological excavations. Restoration included strengthening the walls, rebuilding the chimney, fireplace, and oven in their original locations at the center of the house, replacing the roof with the dormer window removed, and painting the interior walls. The restored house is said to be 85% original. Period English furniture and other items were added to the house to show how it might have looked when Pusey and his family lived there. A corner cupboard that belonged to Pusey and may have been a gift upon his retirement in 1717, was placed in the north west corner of the west room.

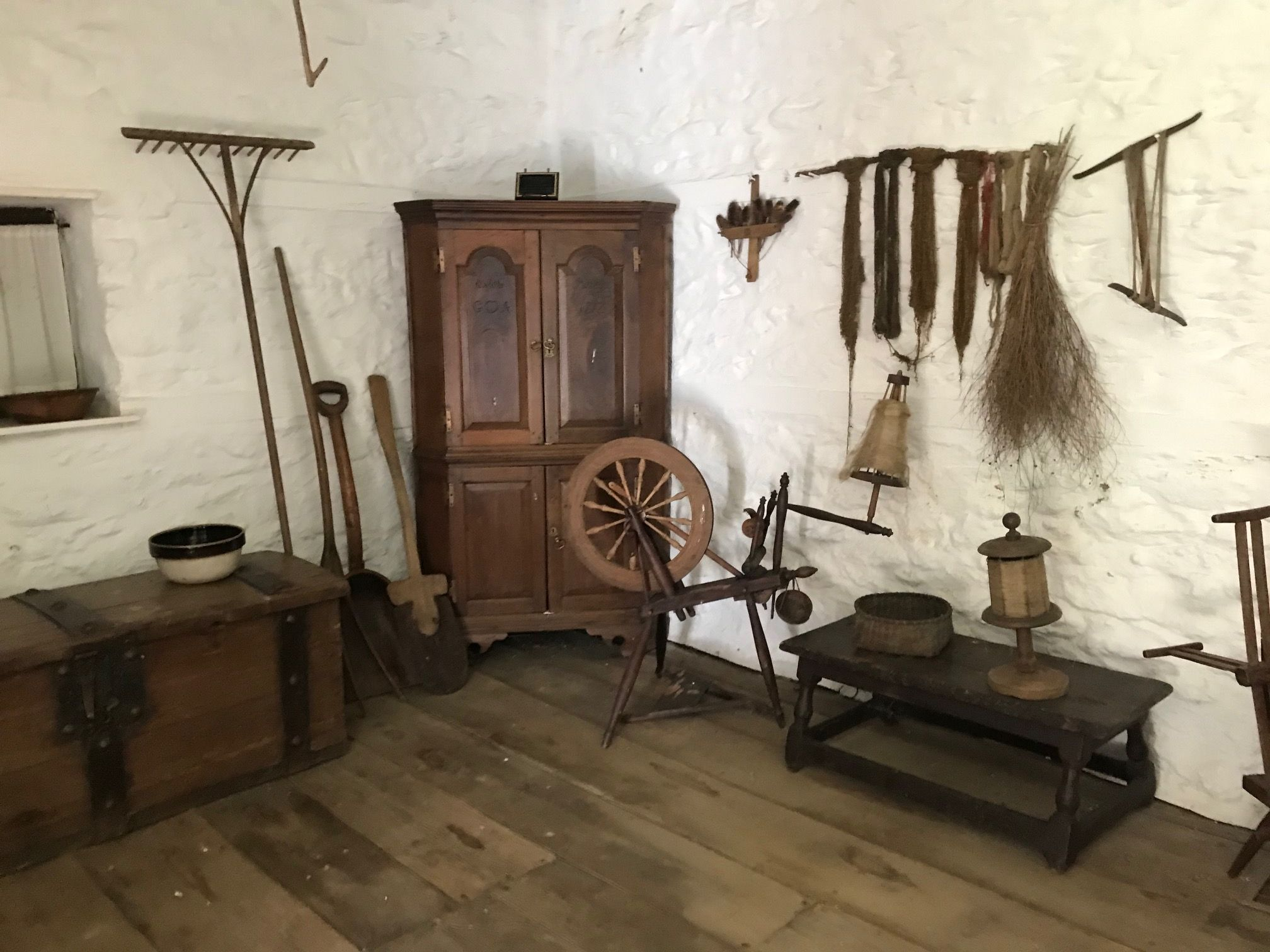
Shows NW corner of west room. A corner cupboard belonging to Pusey is in the corner which is engraved "Caleb Pusey, C(heart)A, 1717."

Bricks have been interspersed randomly through the construction, probably replacing missing stones. The loft now has a door on the east end which has to be accessed by ladder on the outside of the house as there currently is no interior stairway.

The house was listed on the National Register of Historic Places in 1971.

== Chester Mills ==
The mills were assembled in 1683 on Chester Creek and were the first proprietary grist mill and sawmill in the province. They were located about 40 rods (1/8 mile) upstream from the house. They were operated successfully at this site until the great flood of 1687 when the mills and their dam were swept away. Efforts were immediately started to replace them. This work was completed, probably by 1689, at a new site that was slightly upstream from the original mills. Unfortunately, the new dam was subsequently destroyed by a "great freshet" (flood), although the mills apparently survived. (Note another source says the original mills and dam were lost in 1683 and the second dam was lost in 1687.) It was decided as a result to build a new dam about a mile upstream, below a tributary known as Baldwin's run, and send the water down to the mills in a mill race or canal. The race is shown on Samuel Lightfoot's 1730 map, which also shows the Pusey house, Chester Creek, and the mills.

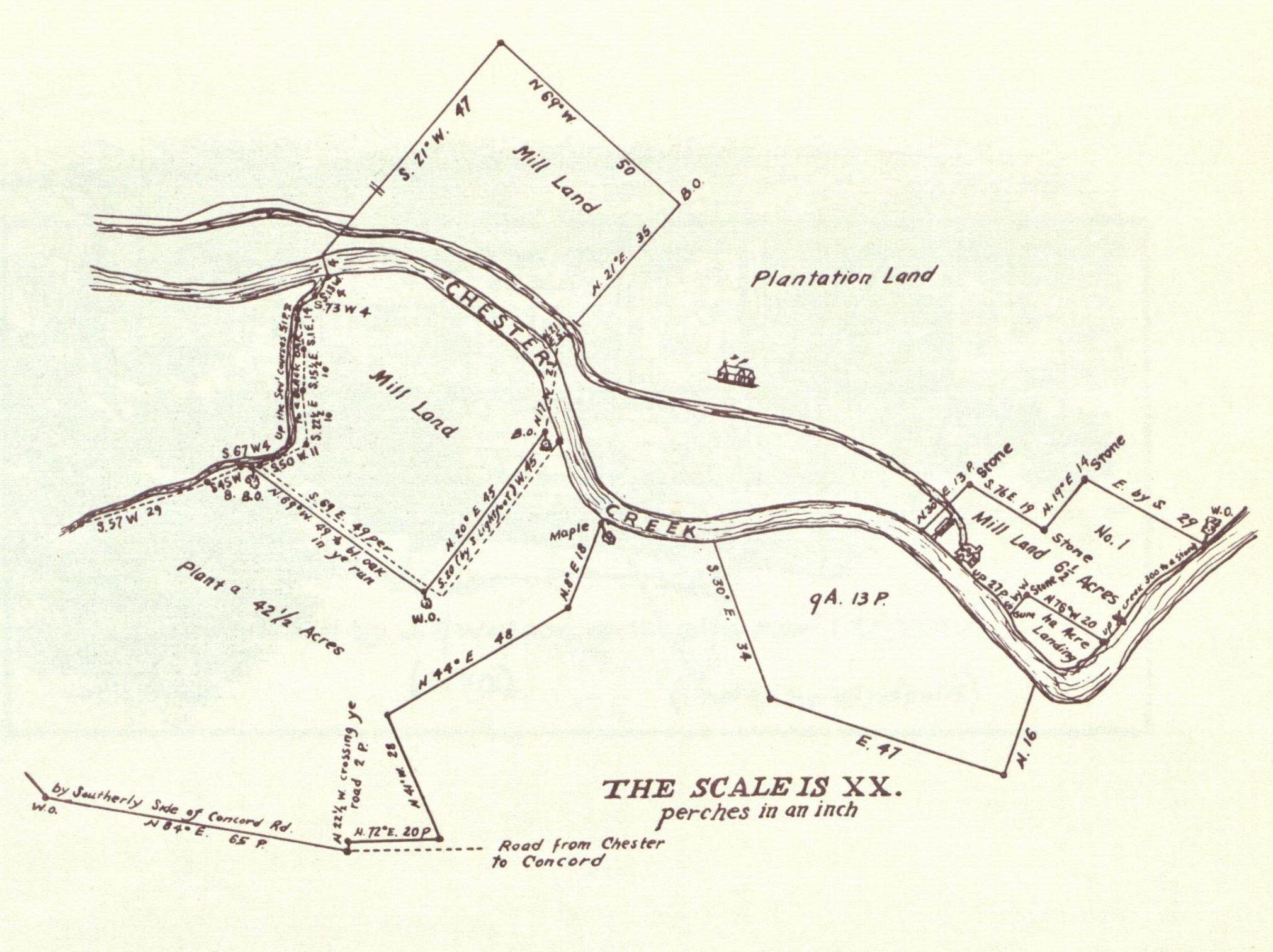
Samuel Lightfoot's 1730 map. The Pusey House is marked by a small symbol of a house. The mill race is the thin line that passes below the house and terminates on the right at the mill. Water flow in the creek and race is from left to right. North on the map is about 17 degrees clockwise from vertical.

(On current maps, Baldwin's Run enters Chester Creek near the west end of Worrilow Rd. on the opposite side of the creek.) Land was purchased for this purpose from Thomas Brassey and William Woodmansey (Woodmansey is parcel #86 on the 1687 map). The completed dam was at a site previously used for fording the river, and the top of the dam henceforth became part of the Kings Highway. As a result, a lot of travelers passed by the Pusey house, often stopping to visit. This arrangement was successful for a while, but by 1693 the mills had greatly deteriorated and Pusey was persuaded to donate 5 acres of his plantation for the construction of a new mill. This site was slightly downstream from Pusey's house and the race was extended to reach it (see 1730 map). On current maps, the site was near the southern end of Upland Ave. in Upland, PA. The river makes a sharp right angle bend to the left at the mill site, which is shown on the 1730 map can also be found on current maps. The location of the house is marked on the 1730 map; it's just above the mill race and below the word "plantation." Note that the creek and the mill race flow from left to right on the map (approximately west to east). The earlier mill locations are not marked but can be assumed to be in the indicated mill lands upstream from the house. The race has been filled in and is no longer visible. On current maps, the race travelled along the south side of Race Street, while the house is on the north side. The mills were operated for many years at this third and final site. In 1708, a fulling and dyeing mill was added for the processing of wool. The mills burned down in 1858.

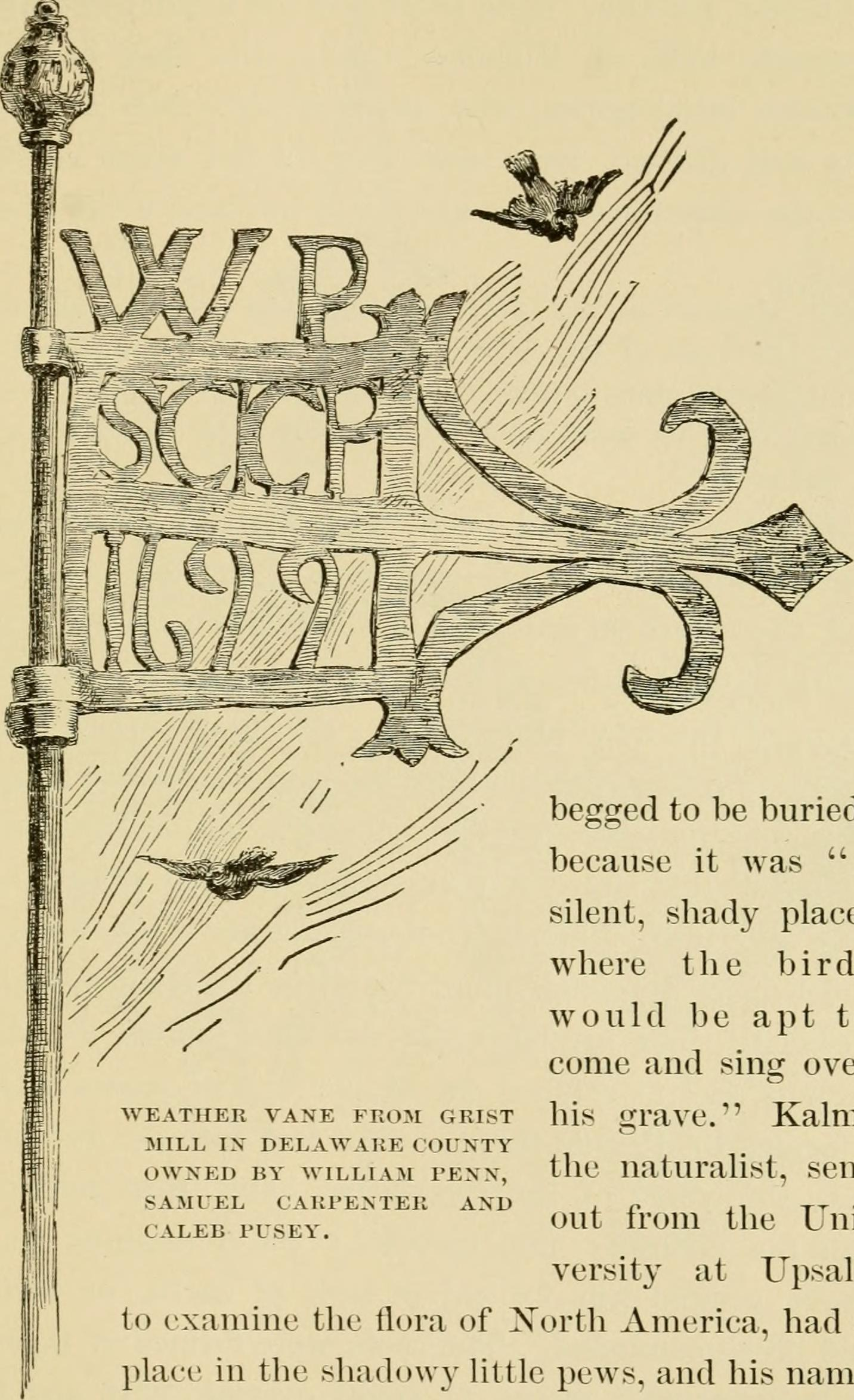
1699 weather vane

== Weather vane ==
A now famous historic weather vane once sat atop of the Chester Mills, bearing the initials of the three men who owned and operated the mills in 1699. Henry Graham Ashmead, in his 1884 book on Delaware County history states: "Doubtless when repairs were made to the mill, in 1699, the rude iron vane bearing the initials W. P. (William Penn), S. C. (Samuel Carpenter), C. P. (Caleb Pusey), and the date, 1699, was placed on the building. When Richard Flower owned the property the old vane surmounted the dwelling-house of the owner, but on gusty nights, turning in the wind, it squeaked and groaned so noisily that it was taken down. In 1870, Reese W. Flower presented it to the Historical Society of Pennsylvania ..."

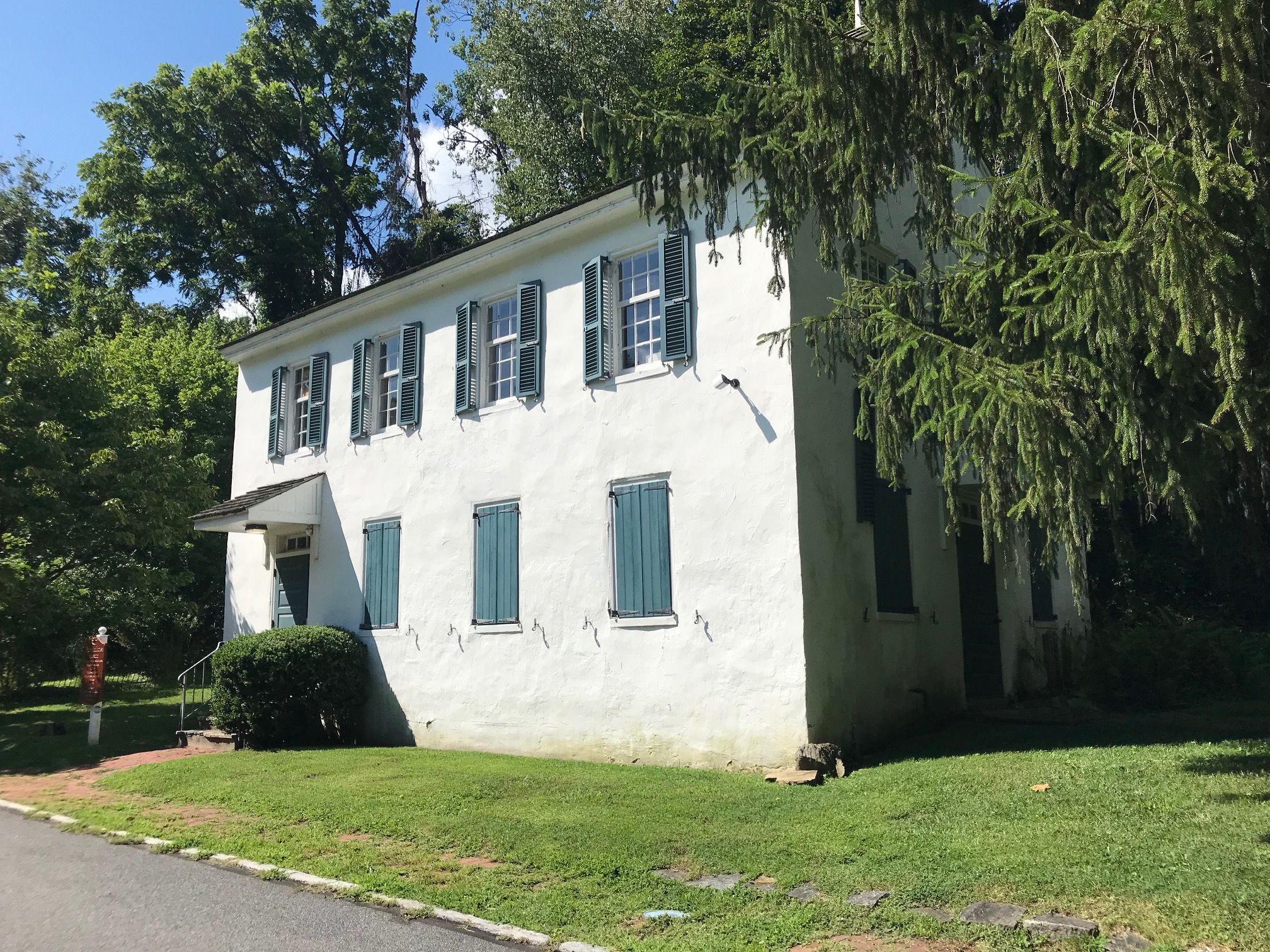
Crozer school in 2023

== Crozer Schoolhouse ==
Also located on the property, just to the left of the Pusey House, is the Crozer Schoolhouse, which was built in 1849 by John Price Crozer for the children of millworkers at his factory. The upstairs later became a repository for thousands of artifacts that were dug up on the property by archaeologists. The downstairs is currently set up as a school room and also has some displays showing off a few of the artifacts. Crozer also built the Upland Baptist Church and millworker housing in the area.

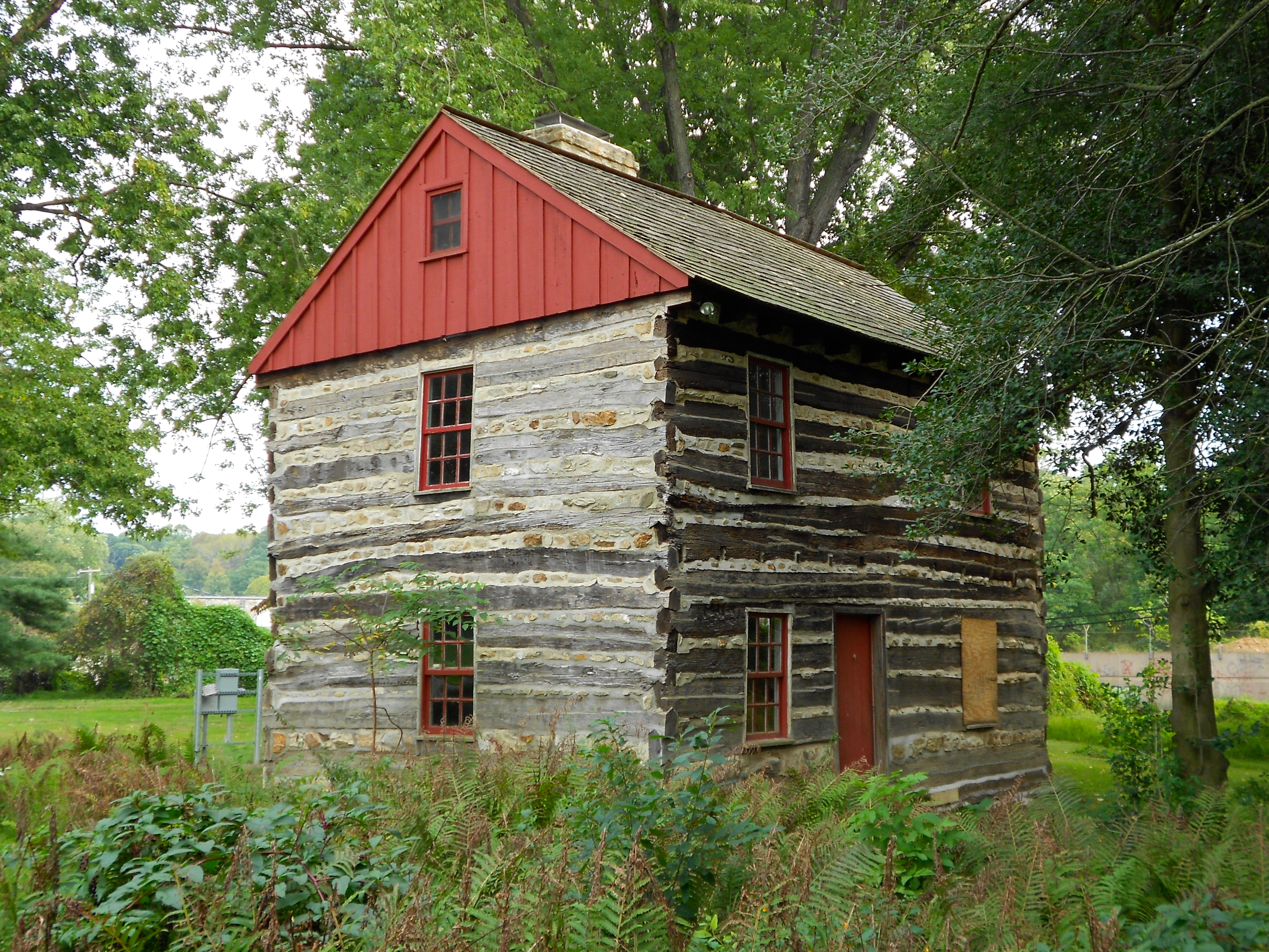
Pennock Log House in 2012

== Pennock Log House ==
The Pennock Log House, which was built by a descendant of Pusey's in 1790, was originally located in Springfield Township. In 1965 it was disassembled and moved to a site across the street from the Caleb Pusey House by the Friends of The Caleb Pusey House. It unfortunately developed some serious structural problems causing one of the walls to collapse and it had to be demolished and removed in or about 2021.

== Sister Home ==
The sister home of the Caleb Pusey House is the Vincent House in Fort Dodge, Iowa.

== Gallery ==
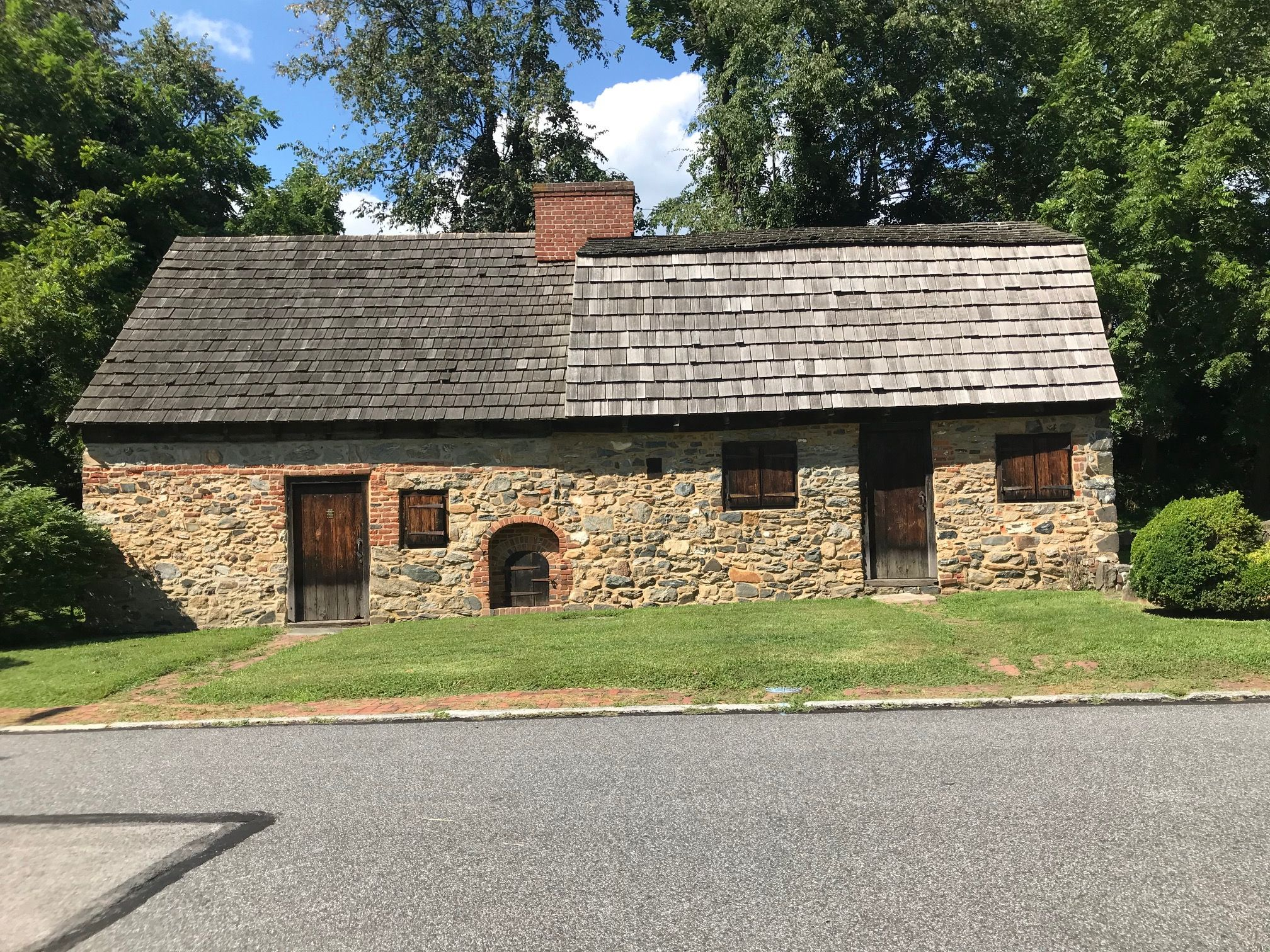
Front view of house looking north, 2023

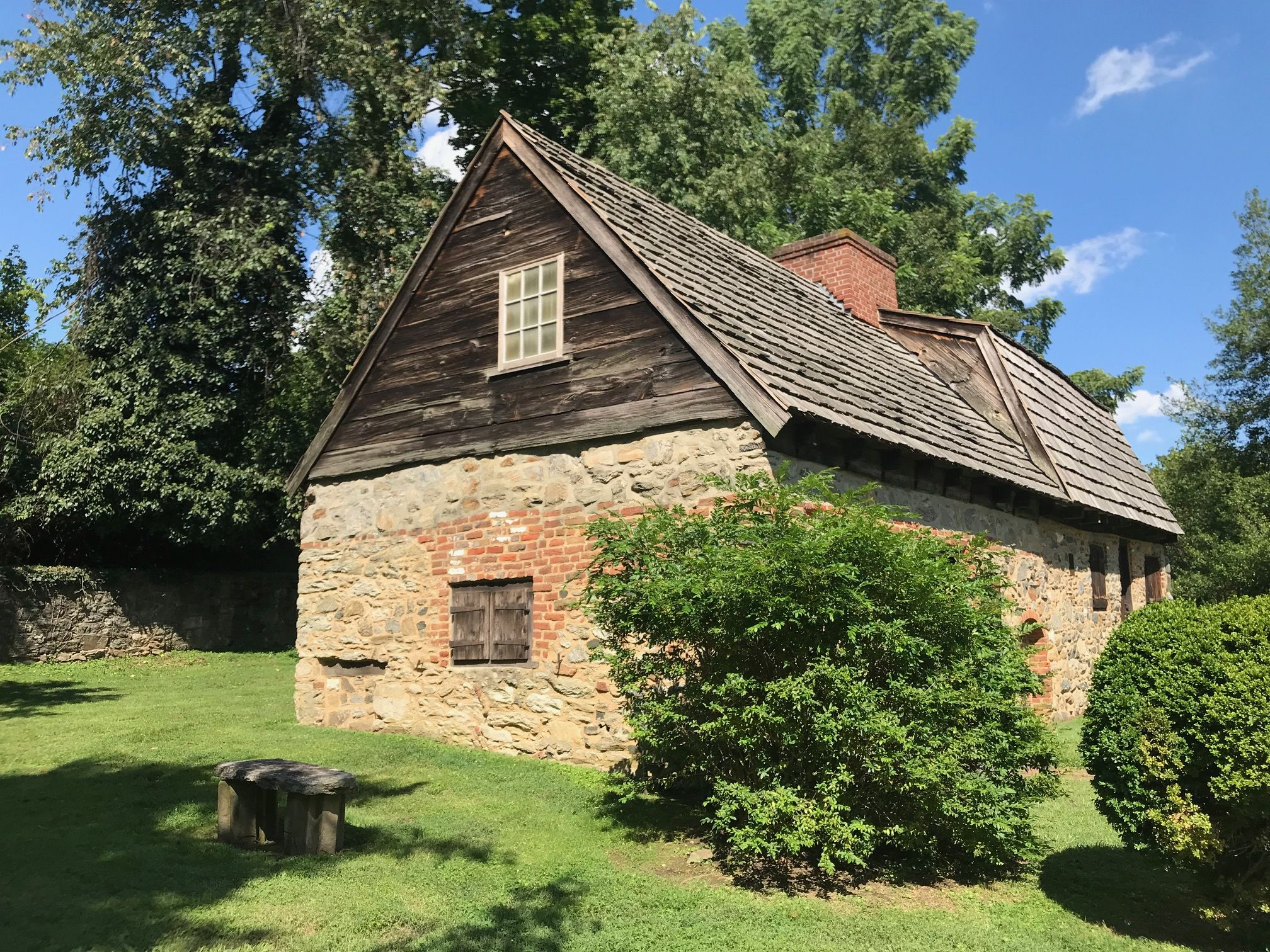
View of house from SW showing central location of chimney and transition in roof style from gable to gambrel, 2023

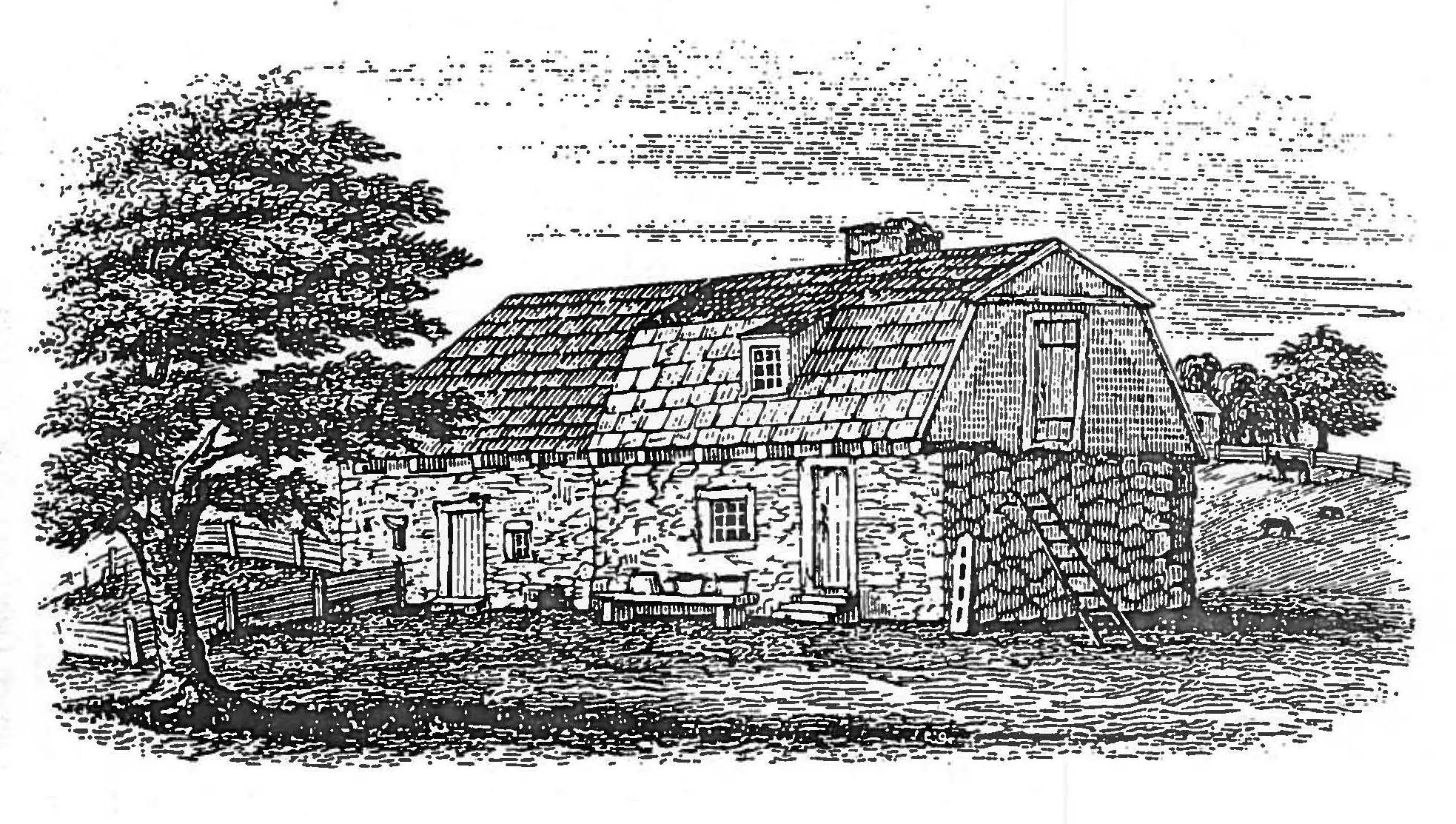
Sketch made before 1827, shows chimney at back of the house, loft access door, dormer window, and no sign of the buried east wing.

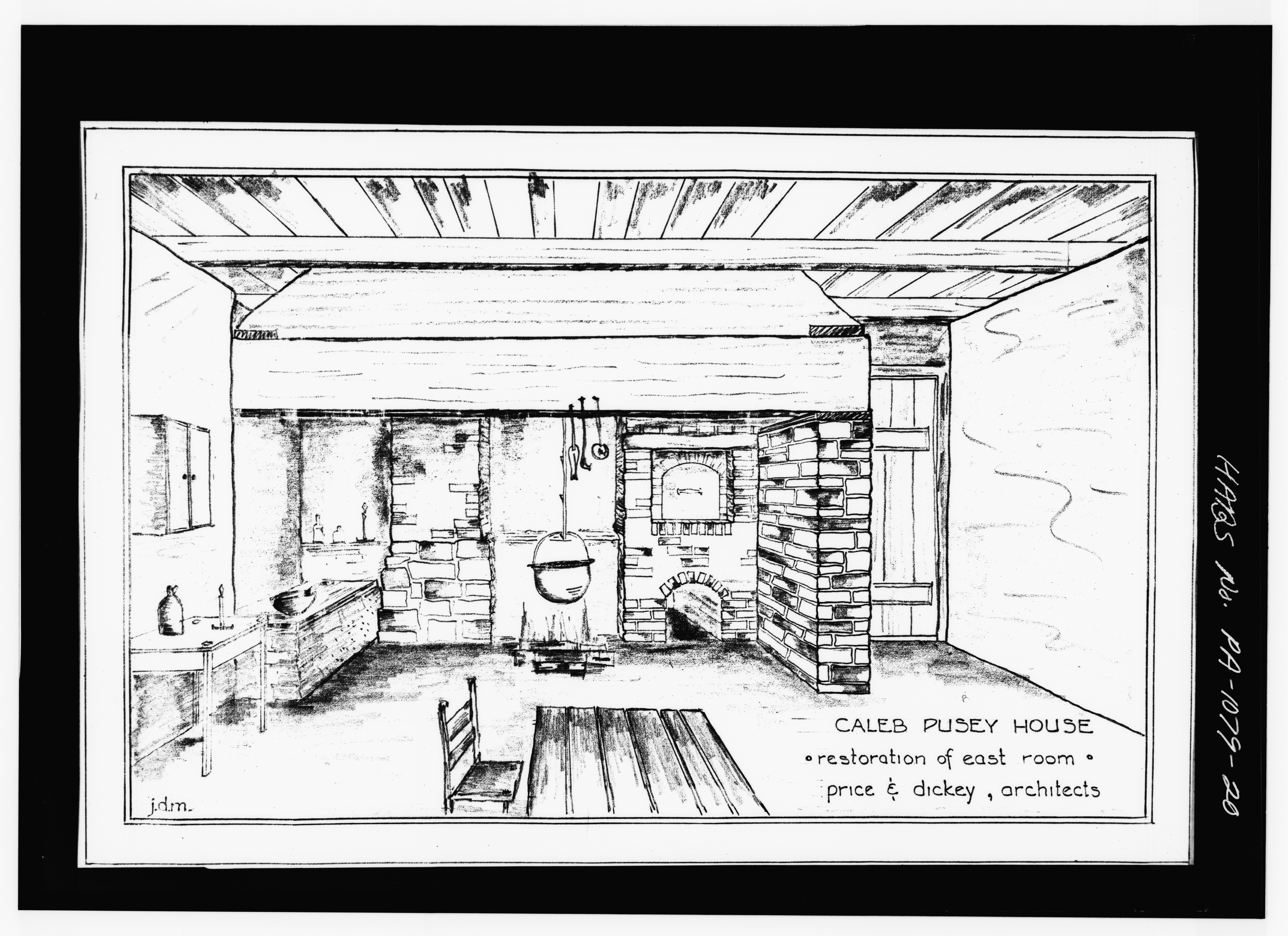
Architect's drawing of the plan for restoring the fireplace and the east room

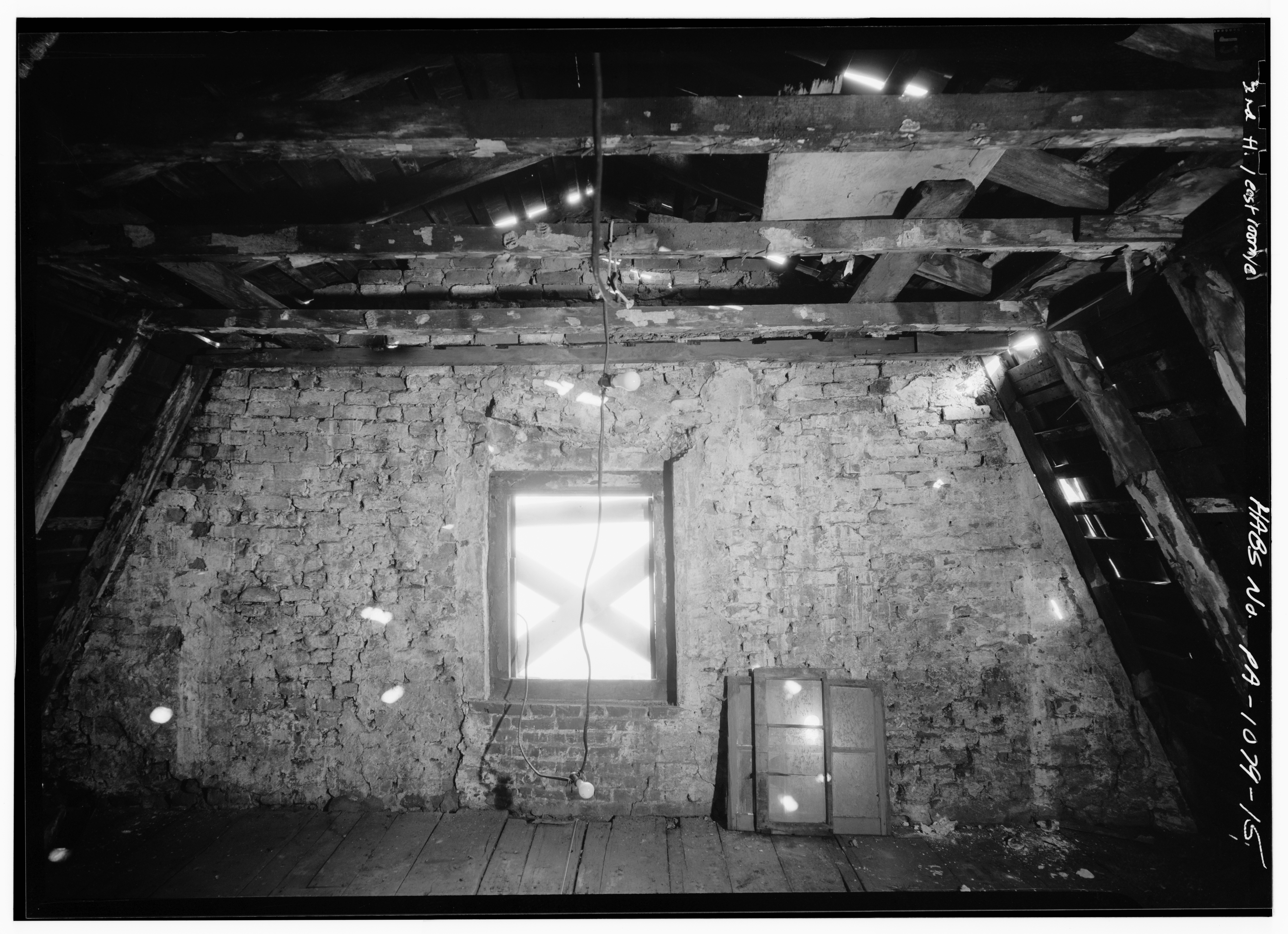
Loft above the east room looking east, the window shown was converted back to a door during restoration

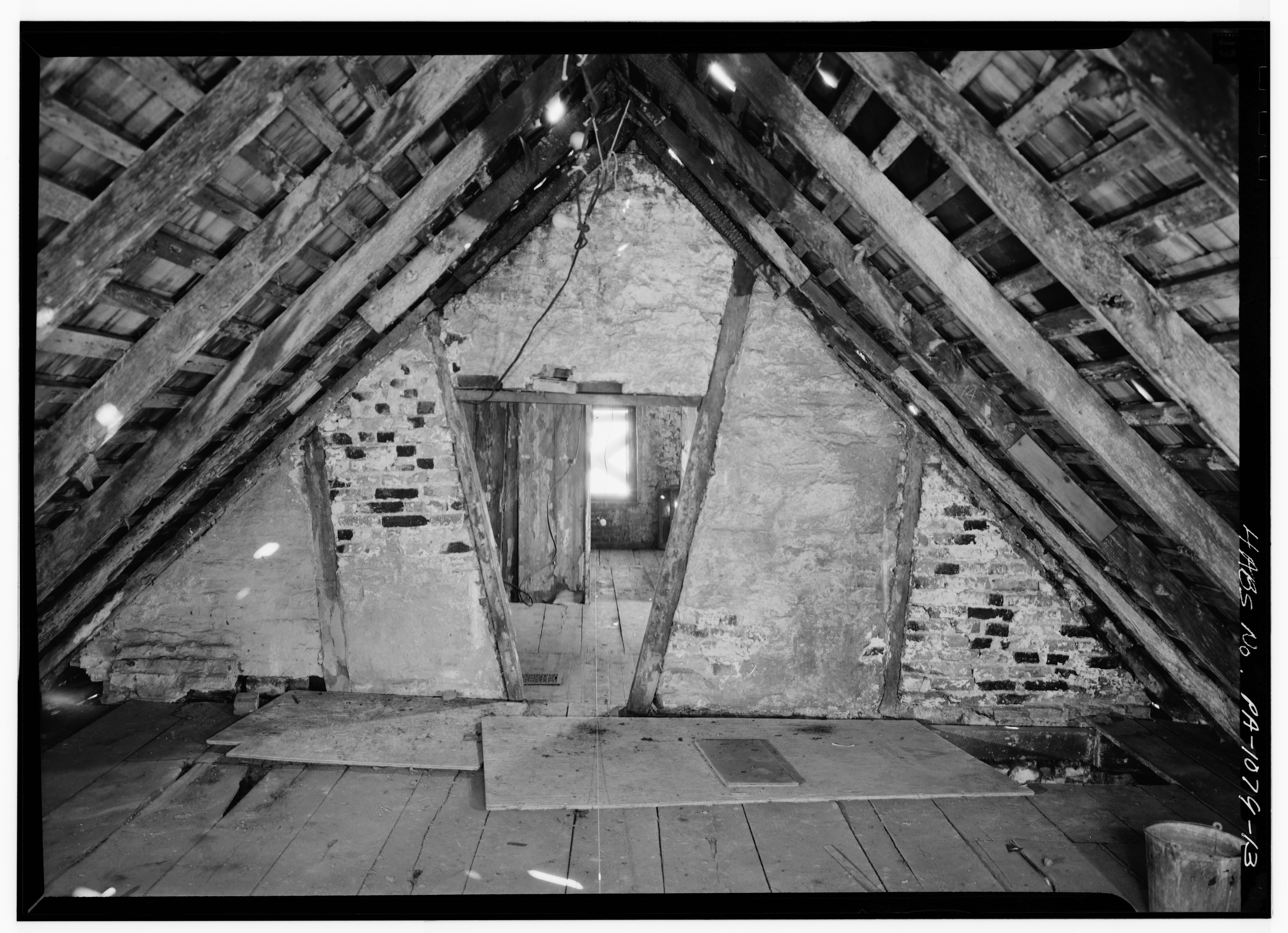
Loft above the west room looking east, shows interior doorways and window in the east room (prior to restoration)

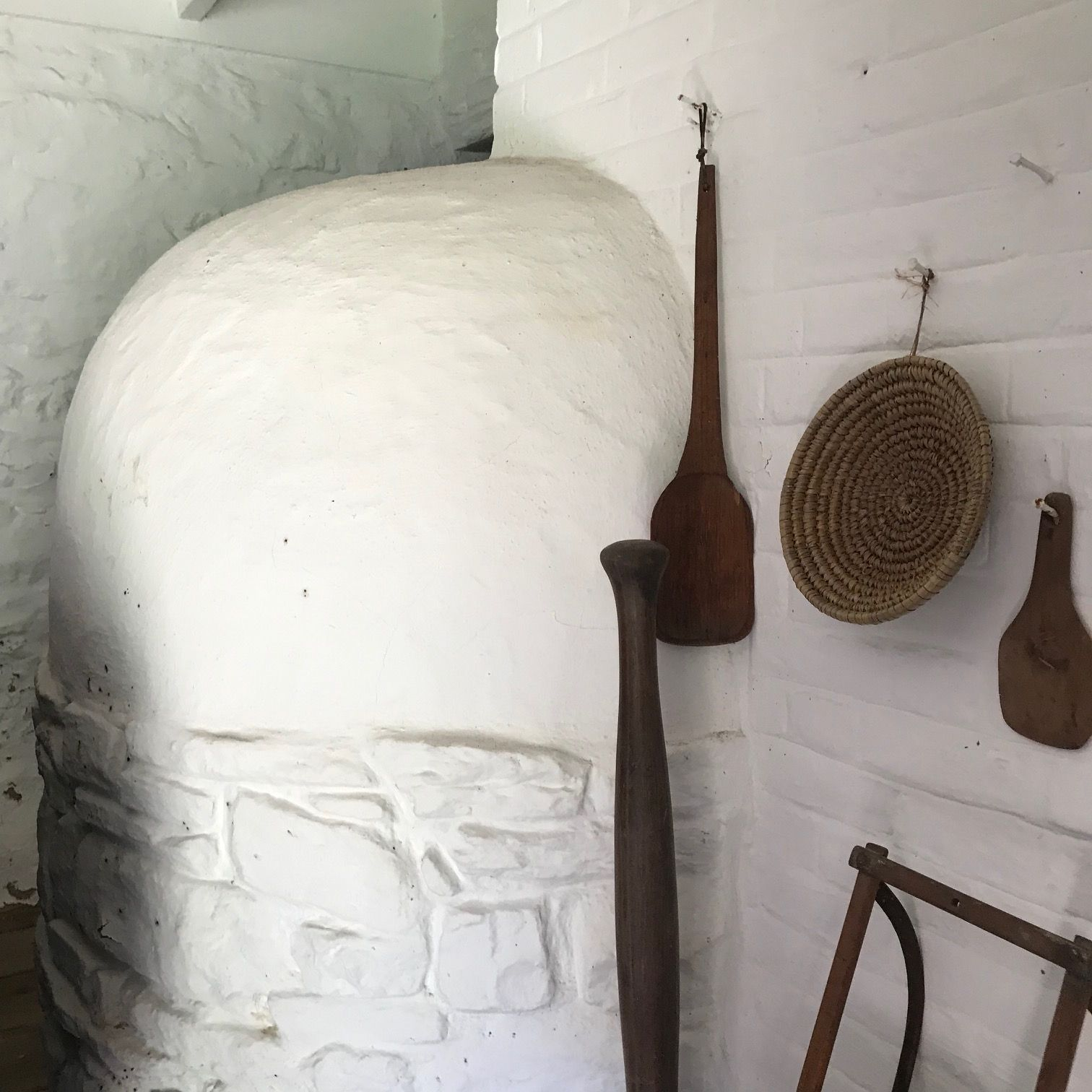
Rear of the baking oven viewed from the west room, 2023

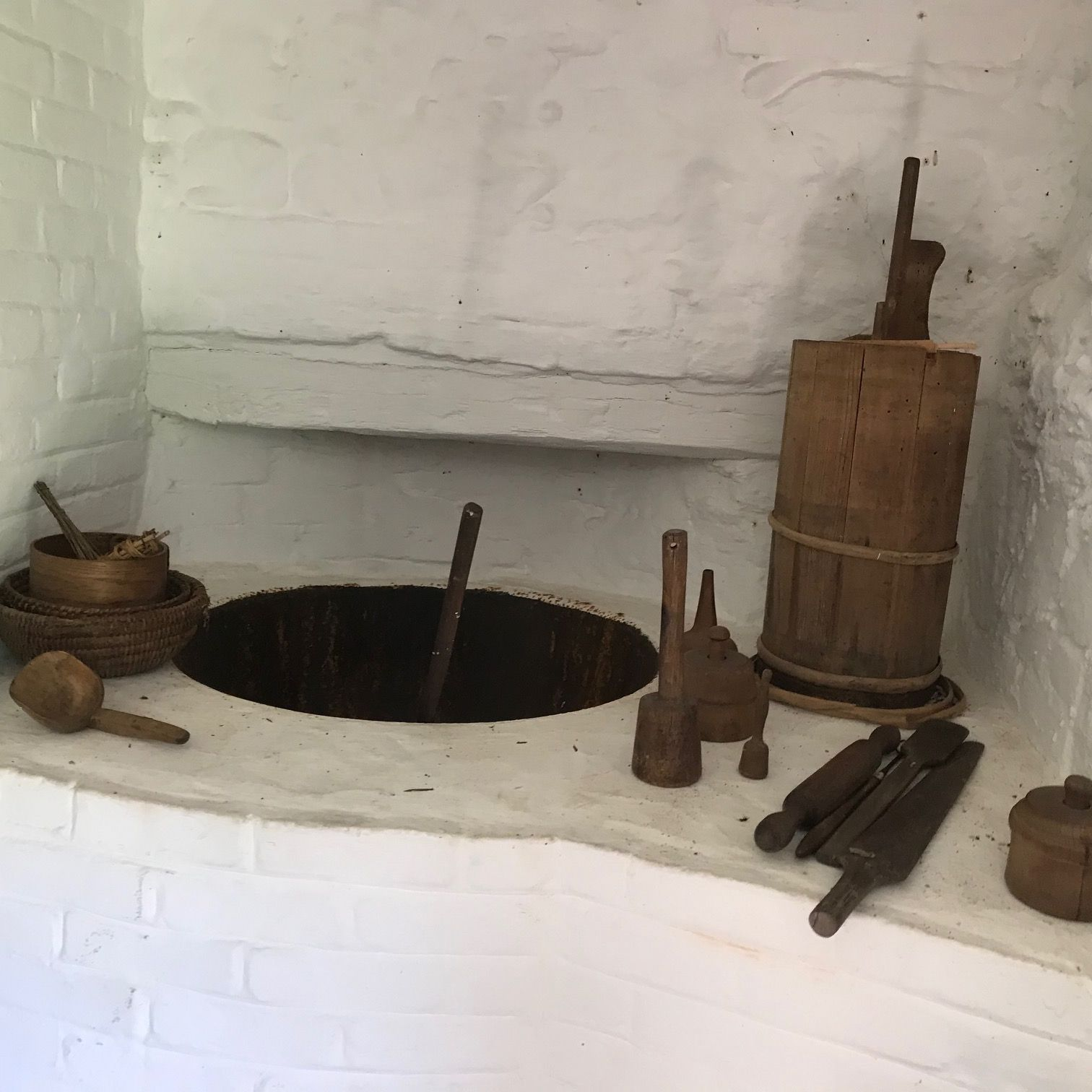
Stand-kettle, located in the west room to the right of the rear of the oven. It can be heated from below.

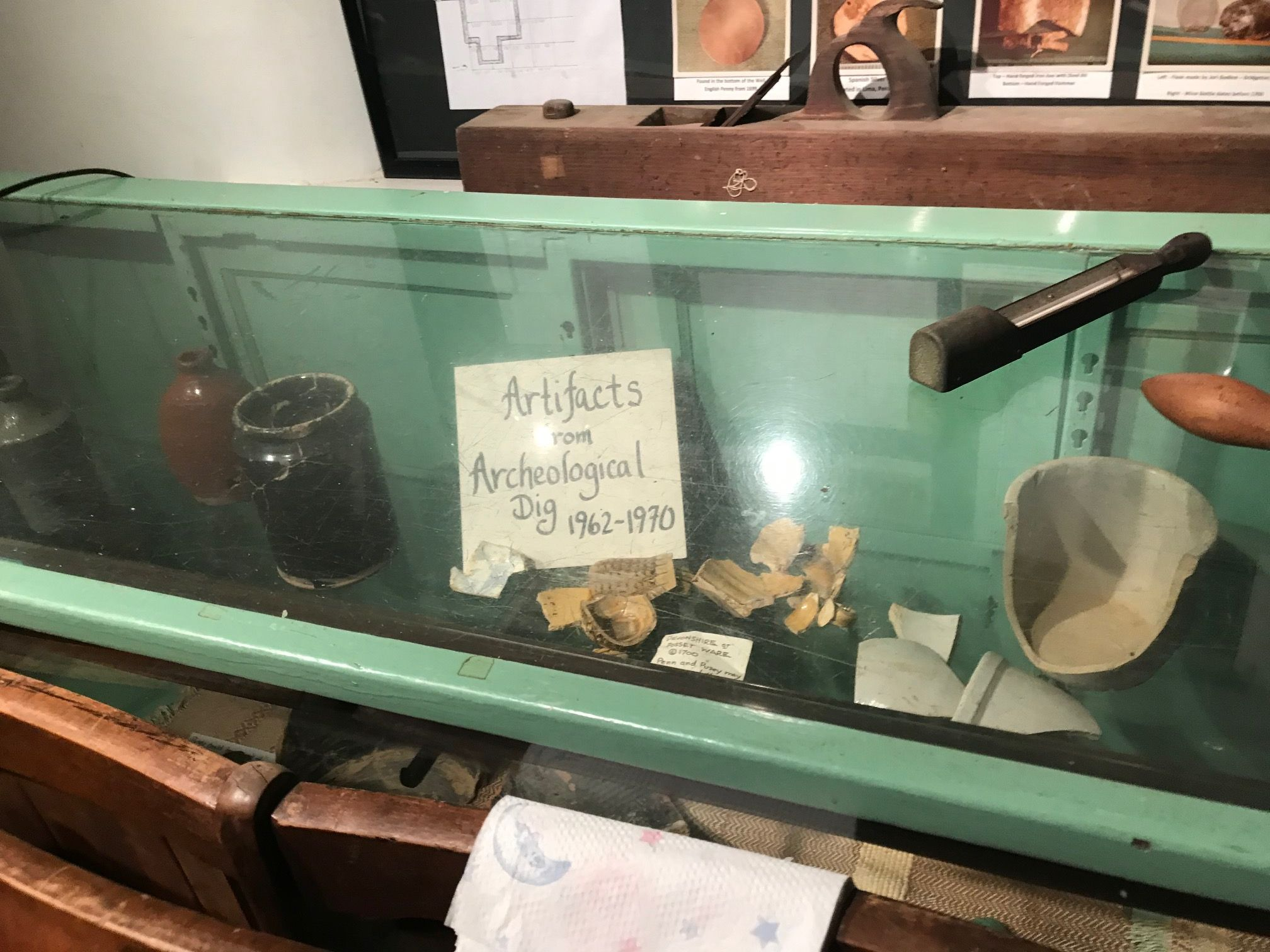
Cabinet at the Crozer Schoolhouse displaying artifacts from the Caleb Pusey House

== See also ==
- South Brook Farm
- List of the oldest buildings in Pennsylvania
