= Vincent House (Fort Dodge, Iowa) =

Historic house in Iowa, United States

- U.S. National Register of Historic Places
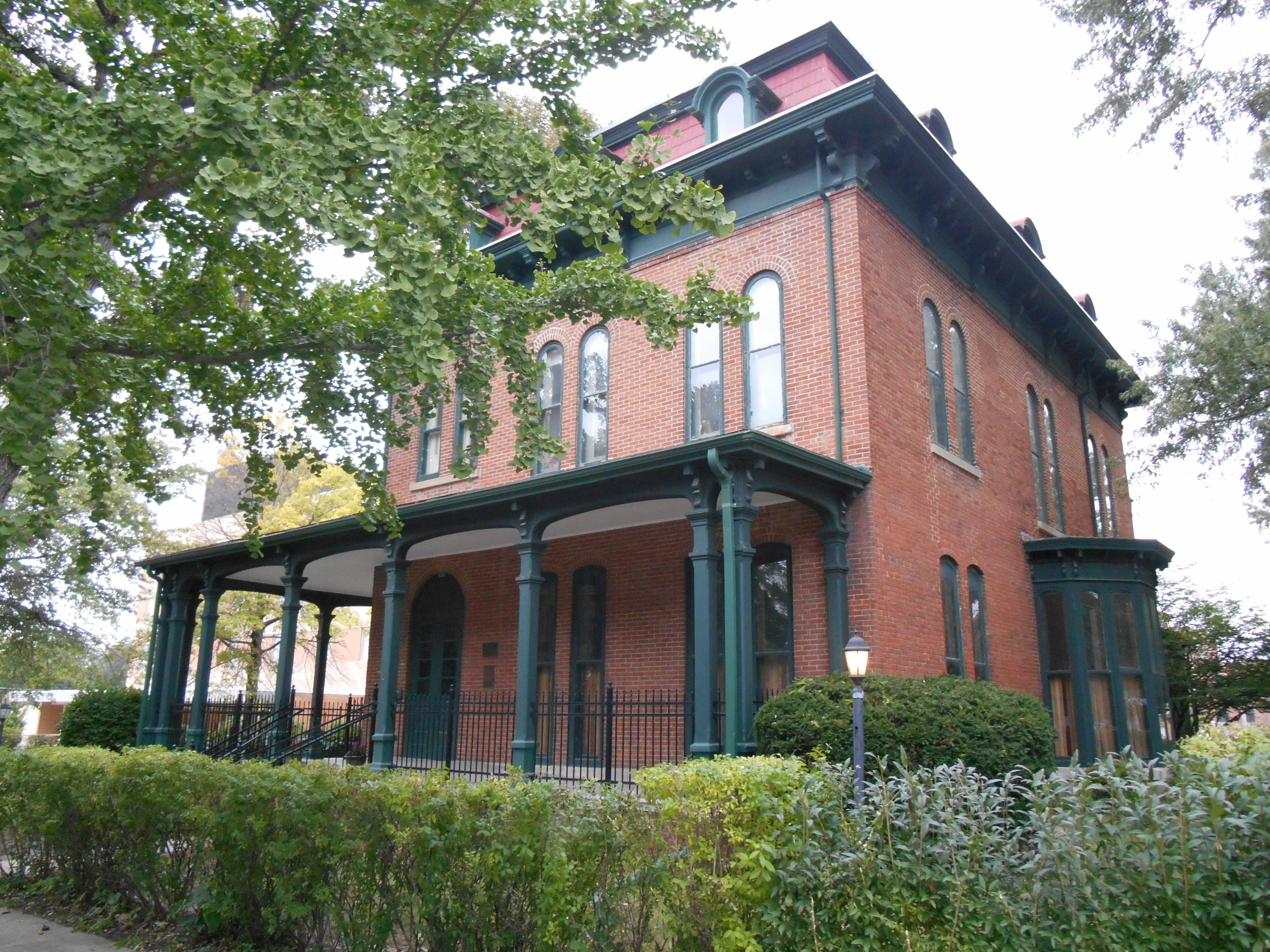

- Location within Iowa Location within the United States
- Location: 824 3rd Ave., S. Fort Dodge, Iowa
- Coordinates: 42°30′09″N 94°11′08.5″W
- Area: less than one acre
- Built: 1871
- Architectural style: Second Empire
- NRHP reference No.: 73000743
- Added to NRHP: April 23, 1973

The Vincent House is a historic building located in Fort Dodge, Iowa, United States. The distinguishing features of this three-story, red brick, Second Empire house is its mansard roof and wrap-around porch. Web Vincent moved his family Caleb, Cameron and Anne R. into the house in 1879 and it remained in the Vincent family until 1969 when Anne R. Vincent died. Vincent was a businessman who made his fortune in the local gypsum industry. A ballroom was located on the third floor and its walls were composed of gypsum plaster, which was the first time it was used in the United States. The house was listed on the National Register of Historic Places in 1973.

Vincent House is also known as the sister home to the Caleb Pusey House.
