= John P. Crozer II Mansion =

Historic house in Pennsylvania, United States

- U.S. National Register of Historic Places
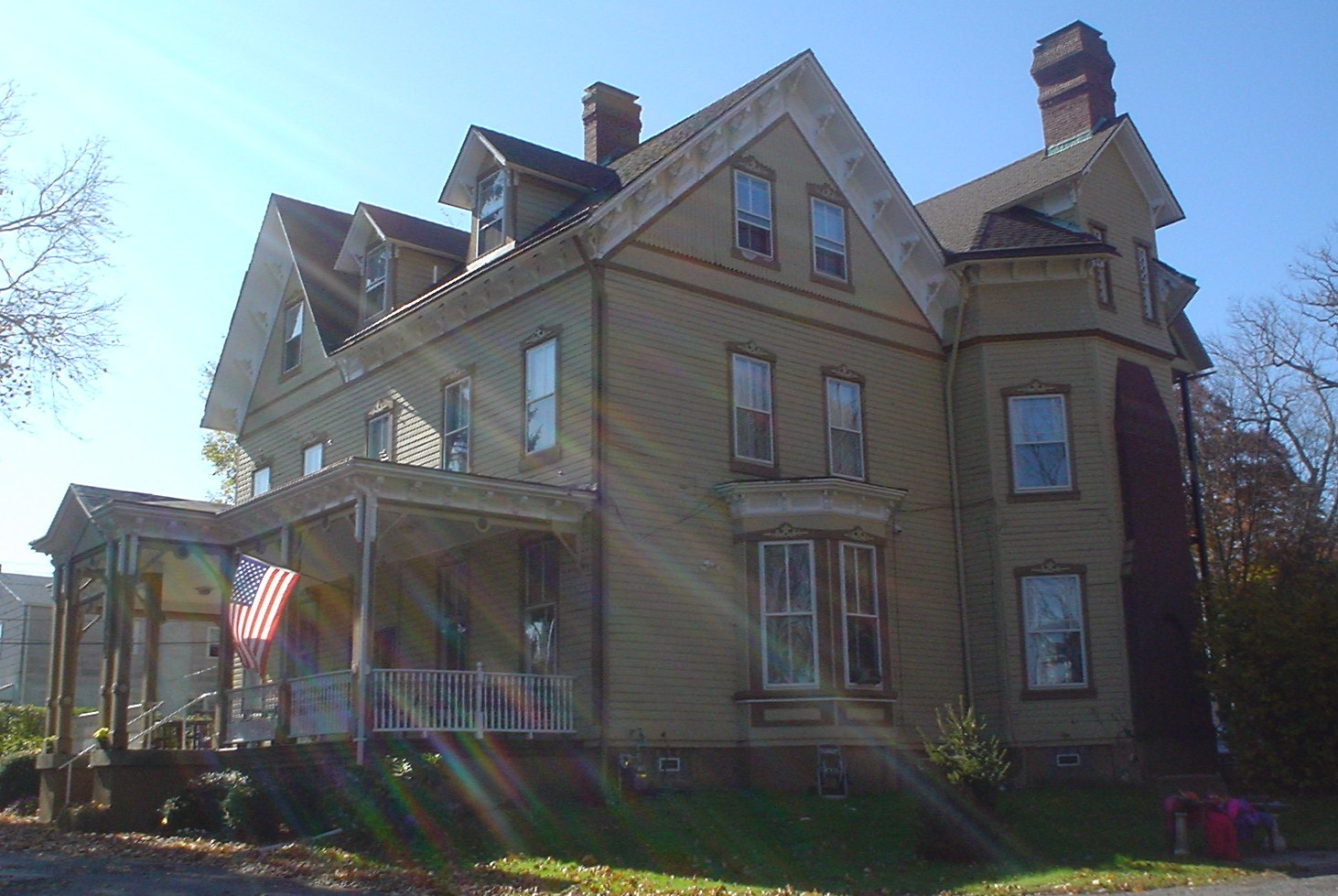
- John P. Crozer II Mansion, November 2009

- Location within Pennsylvania Location within the United States
- Location: 900, 922, 924 and 926 Main St., Upland, Pennsylvania
- Coordinates: 39°52′31″N 75°23′00″W
- Area: 4.2 acres (1.7 ha)
- Built: 1879-1880
- Architectural style: Gothic, Queen Anne
- NRHP reference No.: 80003486
- Added to NRHP: July 23, 1980

The John P. Crozer II Mansion, also known as the Allcutt Property, is an historic mansion in Upland, Delaware County, Pennsylvania, United States.

It was added to the National Register of Historic Places in 1980.

== History and architectural features ==
Erected between 1879 and 1880, this historic structure is a three-story mansion house that was built entirely of California redwood. It reflects grandiose Victorian tastes, with elements of the Gothic and Queen Anne styles. An addition was built in 1907. The mansion was later divided into eight apartments. Also located on the property are a contributing carriage house, barn, trophy house, spring house, remains of greenhouses, a root cellar, and an ice house.
