= Upland, Pennsylvania =

Borough in Pennsylvania, US

- Borough
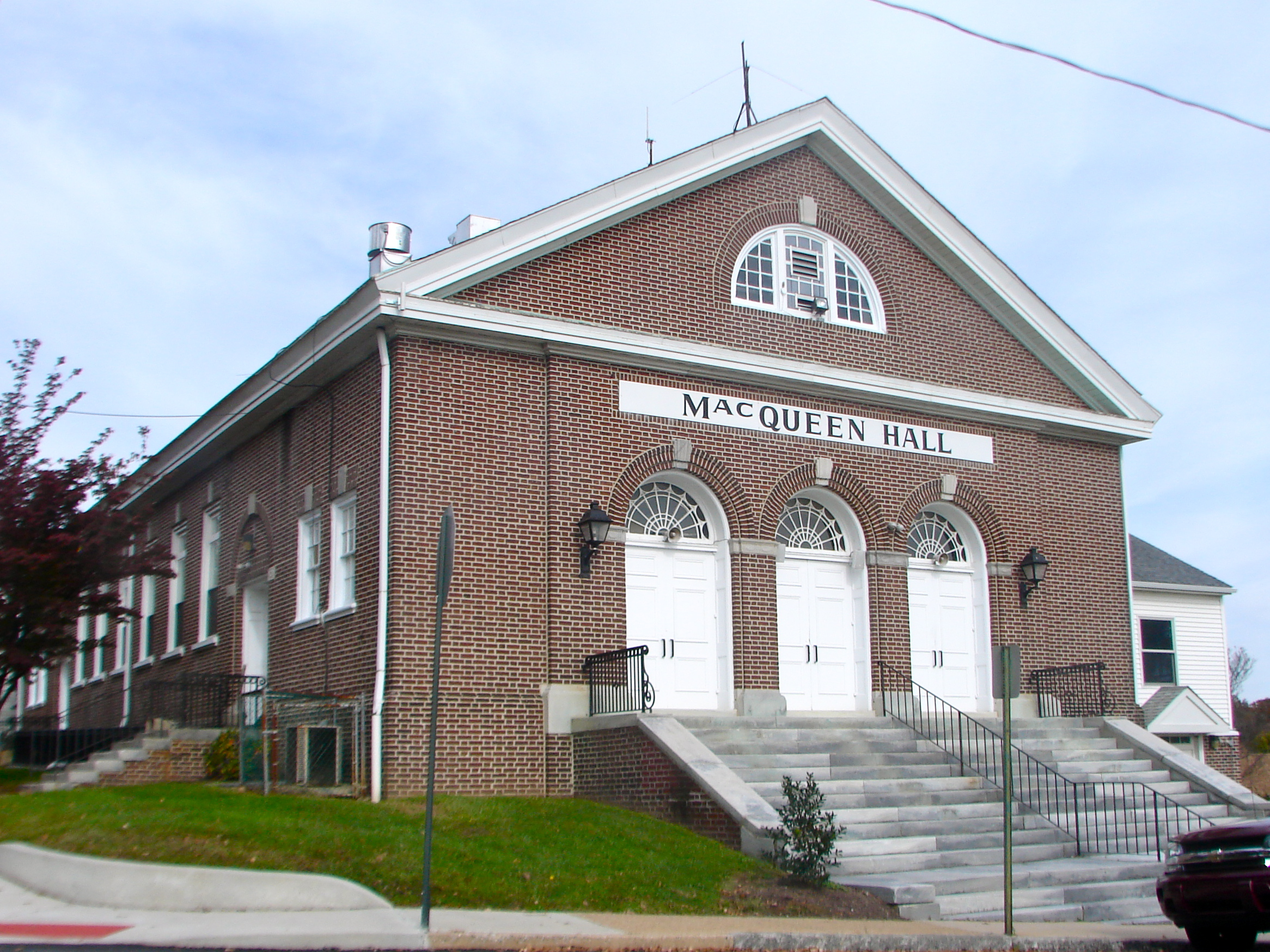
- Upland Borough Office

- Location of Upland in Delaware County, Pennsylvania (top) and of Delaware County in Pennsylvania (below)

- Location of Upland in Pennsylvania Upland (the United States)
- Coordinates: 39°51′24″N 75°22′46″W
- Country: United States
- State: Pennsylvania
- County: Delaware
- Settled: 1643

Area
  - Total: 0.65 sq mi (1.68 km^{2})
  - Land: 0.65 sq mi (1.68 km^{2})
  - Water: 0 sq mi (0.00 km^{2})
- Elevation: 26 ft (7.9 m)

Population (2010)
  - Total: 3,239
  - Estimate (2019): 3,326
  - Density: 5,124.8/sq mi (1,978.68/km^{2})
- Time zone: UTC-5 (EST)
  - Summer (DST): UTC-4 (EDT)
- ZIP Codes: 19013, 19015
- Area code: 610
- FIPS code: 42-045-78712
- FIPS code: 42-78712
- GNIS feature ID: 1190221
- Website: www.uplandboro.org

Upland is a borough in Delaware County, Pennsylvania, United States. Upland is governed by an elected seven-member borough council. As of the 2020 census, Upland had a population of 3,068.

== Geography ==
Upland is located in southern Delaware County at 39°51′24″N 75°22′46″W (39.856762, -75.379429). It is bordered to the west by Chester Township, to the north by the boroughs of Brookhaven and Parkside, and to the northeast, east, and south by the city of Chester. Chester Creek, a southeastward-flowing tributary of the Delaware River, forms the southern boundary of the borough.

According to the U.S. Census Bureau, the borough has a total area of 0.65 square miles (1.68 km^{2}), all land.

== History ==
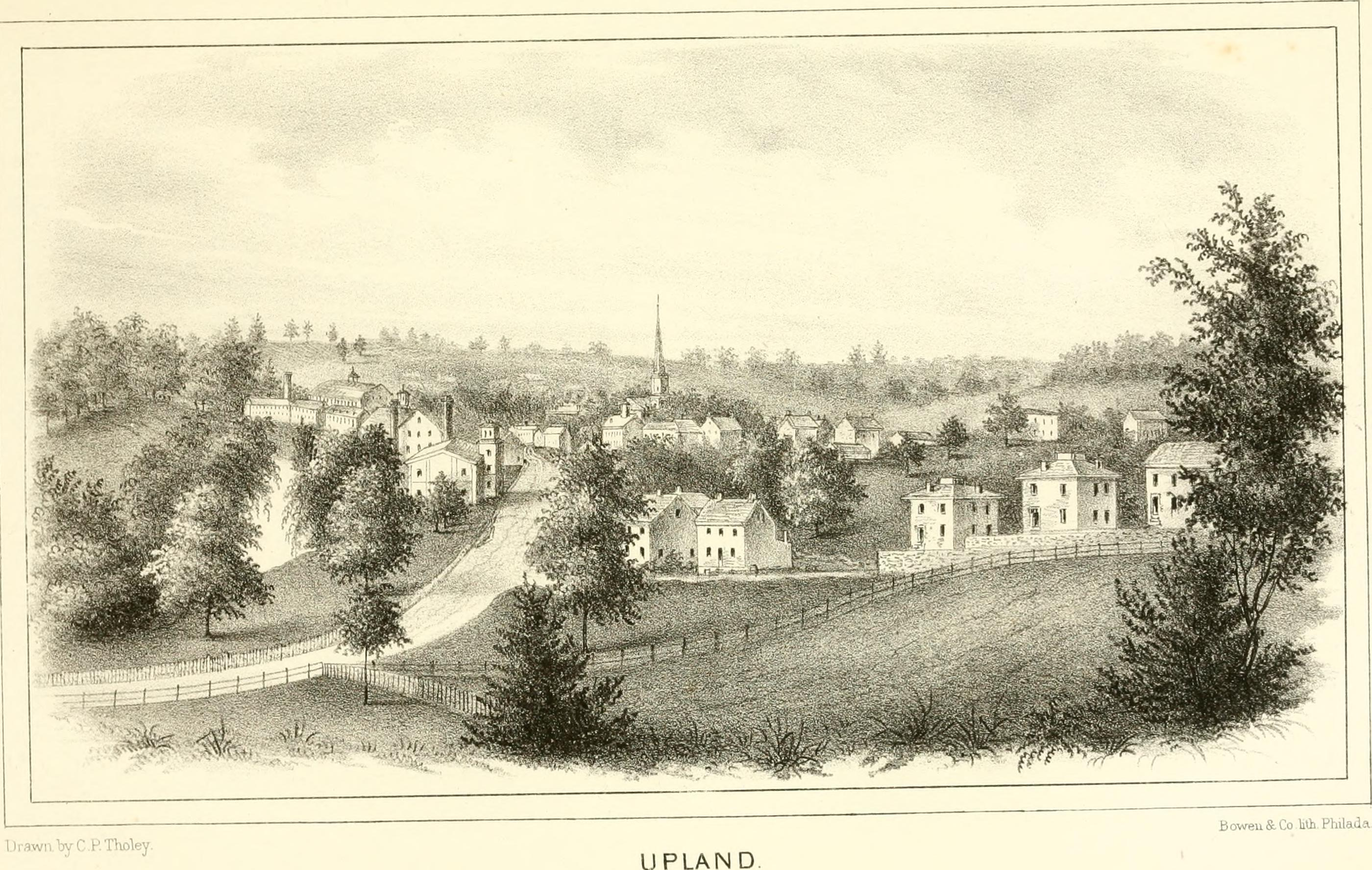
An 1862 image of Upland Township

The first European settlers in this area were from the Swedish colony of New Sweden. They arrived in the area in 1643 and built a permanent settlement at Tinicum Island. Although the name literally means "up land", it also reflects the Swedish province of Uppland.

The settlement of Upland was built around the point where Chester Creek flows into the Delaware River, which is part of the city of Chester, formerly also called "Upland". The colonists had plantations devoted to the cultivation of tobacco for export to Sweden. Upland was reflected on the early map of New Sweden made by Peter Lindstrom in 1654.

During this period, three governments were competing for colonial supremacy in the mid-Atlantic coastal area: the Dutch, the Swedish and the English. The Swedish settlement was incorporated into Dutch New Netherland on September 15, 1655. In 1664, the English captured New Netherland from the Dutch. In 1676, the Duke of York's laws were promulgated as the rule of conduct on the Delaware River, and courts were established, one of which was the Upland.

By the mid-1800s, the Upland Mills were built along Chester Creek in Upland by the wealthy textile manufacturer John Price Crozer. The mills produced clothing for the US Army and other customers.

The borough of Upland was founded May 24, 1869.

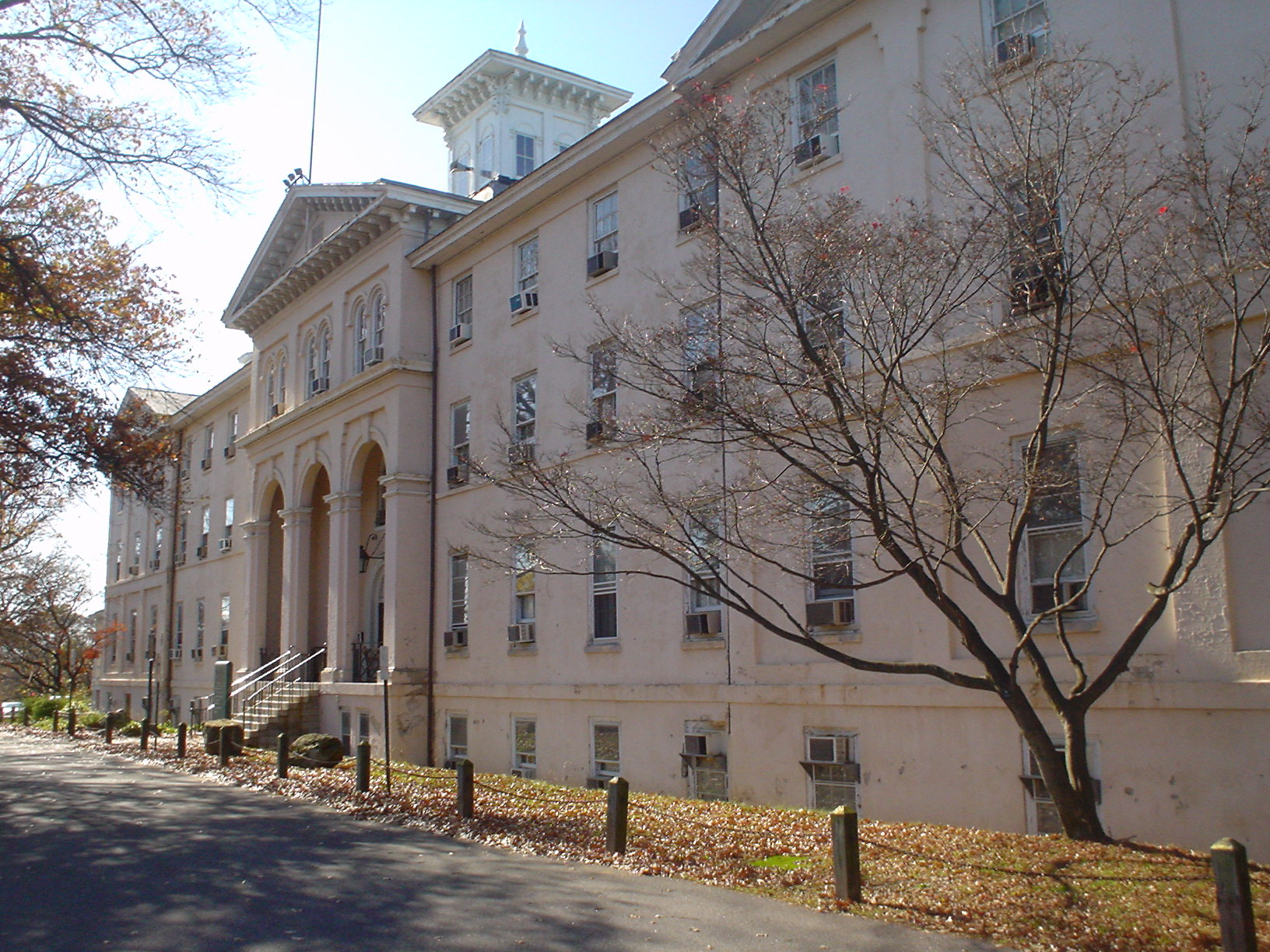
Old Main Building of the Crozer Theological Seminary

The John P. Crozer II Mansion, George K. Crozer Mansion, Caleb Pusey House, Old Main of the Crozer Theological Seminary, and Pusey-Crozier Mill Historic District are listed on the National Register of Historic Places. The Pusey House is one of the oldest buildings in the United States, completed in 1696, and one of the only extant buildings known to have been visited by William Penn (in addition to the Merion Friends Meeting House).

== Education ==
Residents in Upland are zoned to the Chester-Upland School District. Main Street Elementary School is the elementary school in Upland. Residents are also zoned to Smedley Middle School and Chester High School.

Crozer Theological Seminary was a multi-denominational religious institution built in 1858 by the wealthy industrialist John Price Crozer. Its most famous student was Martin Luther King Jr., who graduated in 1951 with a Bachelor of Divinity degree.

In 1970, the school was moved to Rochester, New York in a merger that formed the Colgate Rochester Crozer Divinity School. The Old Main Building of the Crozer Theological Seminary was added to the National Register of Historic Places in 1973. The seminary grounds are part of the Crozer Arboretum and the Old Main building is part of the Crozer-Chester Medical Center.

== Demographics ==
Historical population
Census	Pop.	Note	%±
1870	1,341		—
1880	2,028		51.2%
1890	2,275		12.2%
1900	2,131		−6.3%
1910	2,221		4.2%
1920	2,486		11.9%
1930	2,500		0.6%
1940	2,431		−2.8%
1950	4,081		67.9%
1960	4,343		6.4%
1970	3,930		−9.5%
1980	3,458		−12.0%
1990	3,334		−3.6%
2000	2,977		−10.7%
2010	3,239		8.8%
2020	3,068		−5.3%

=== 2020 census ===
As of the 2020 census, Upland had a population of 3,068. The median age was 36.5 years. 25.5% of residents were under the age of 18 and 16.2% of residents were 65 years of age or older. For every 100 females there were 83.2 males, and for every 100 females age 18 and over there were 76.5 males age 18 and over.

100.0% of residents lived in urban areas, while 0.0% lived in rural areas.

There were 1,218 households in Upland, of which 33.3% had children under the age of 18 living in them. Of all households, 25.1% were married-couple households, 19.7% were households with a male householder and no spouse or partner present, and 47.2% were households with a female householder and no spouse or partner present. About 30.6% of all households were made up of individuals and 15.6% had someone living alone who was 65 years of age or older.

There were 1,321 housing units, of which 7.8% were vacant. The homeowner vacancy rate was 0.8% and the rental vacancy rate was 7.0%.

Racial composition as of the 2020 census
Race	Number	Percent
White	1,278	41.7%
Black or African American	1,437	46.8%
American Indian and Alaska Native	8	0.3%
Asian	24	0.8%
Native Hawaiian and Other Pacific Islander	0	0.0%
Some other race	103	3.4%
Two or more races	218	7.1%
Hispanic or Latino (of any race)	242	7.9%

=== 2010 census ===
As of 2010 census, the racial makeup of the borough was 51.3% White, 41.3% African American, 0.3% Native American, 0.8% Asian, 0.1% Native Hawaiian and Pacific Islander, 2.4% from other races, and 3.8% from two or more races. Hispanic or Latino of any race were 5.8% of the population .

=== 2000 census ===
As of the 2000 census, there were 2,977 people, 1,116 households, and 765 families residing in the borough. The population density was 4,439.0 inhabitants per square mile (1,713.9/km^{2}). There were 1,216 housing units at an average density of 1,813.2 per square mile (700.1/km^{2}). The racial makeup of the borough was 77.23% White, 19.68% African American, 0.30% Native American, 0.34% Asian, 0.81% from other races, and 1.65% from two or more races. Hispanic or Latino of any race were 2.08% of the population.

There were 1,116 households, out of which 33.3% had children under the age of 18 living with them, 42.7% were married couples living together, 20.4% had a female householder with no husband present, and 31.4% were non-families. 26.7% of all households were made up of individuals, and 12.3% had someone living alone who was 65 years of age or older. The average household size was 2.67 and the average family size was 3.28.

In the borough, the population was spread out, with 28.7% under the age of 18, 8.3% from 18 to 24, 27.9% from 25 to 44, 20.2% from 45 to 64, and 14.9% who were 65 years of age or older. The median age was 35 years. For every 100 females there were 89.0 males. For every 100 females age 18 and over, there were 84.3 males.

The median income for a household in the borough was $28,869, and the median income for a family was $35,640. Males had a median income of $31,188 versus $26,723 for females. The per capita income for the borough was $15,391. About 20.1% of families and 25.1% of the population were below the poverty line, including 46.3% of those under age 18 and 6.9% of those age 65 or over.

== Transportation ==
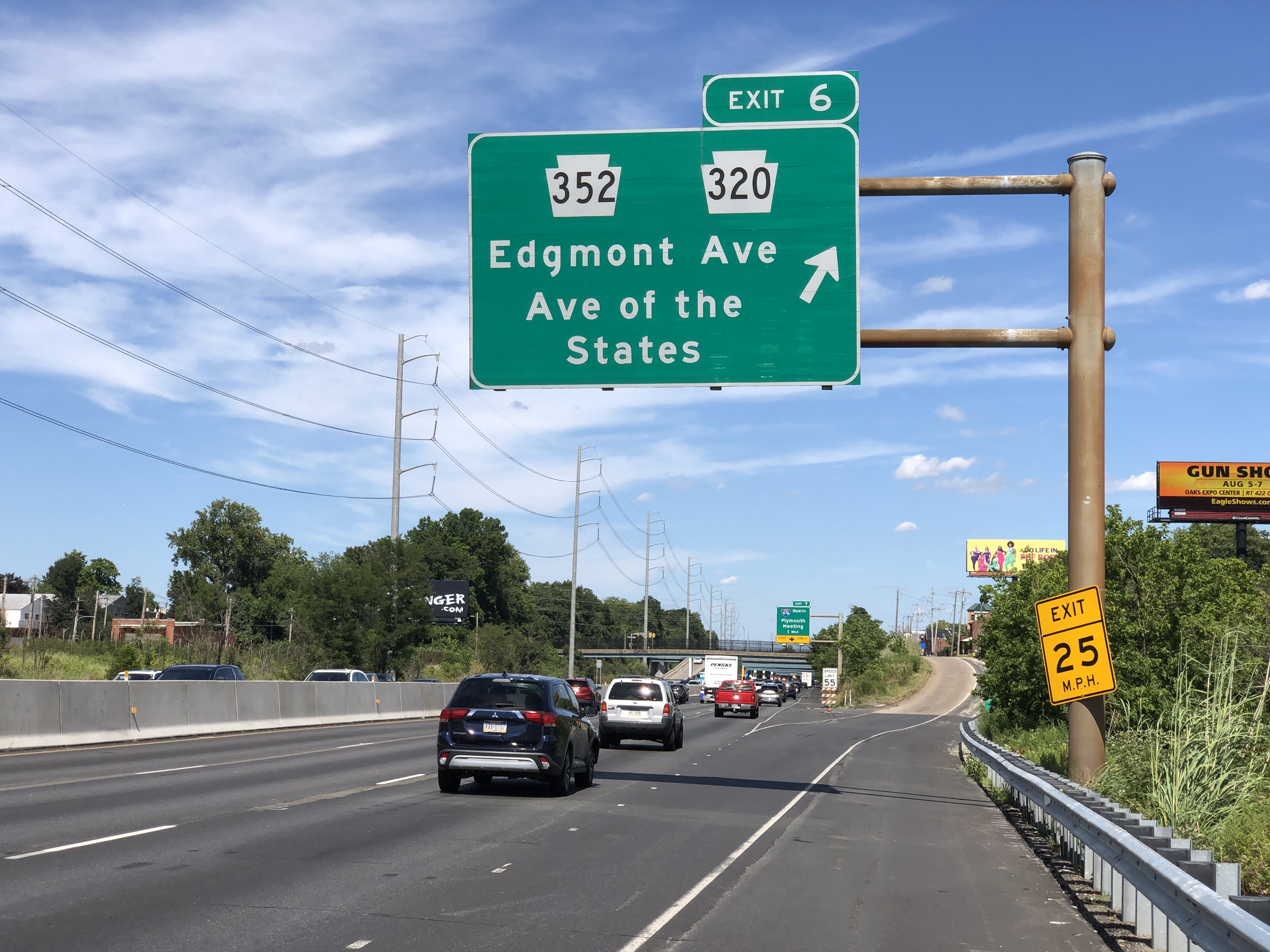
I-95 North in Upland

As of 2014, there were 9.88 miles (15.90 km) of public roads in Upland, of which 2.38 miles (3.83 km) were maintained by the Pennsylvania Department of Transportation (PennDOT) and 7.50 miles (12.07 km) were maintained by the borough.

Interstate 95 is the main highway serving Upland; portions of Interchange 6 are located within the borough.

== Points of interest ==
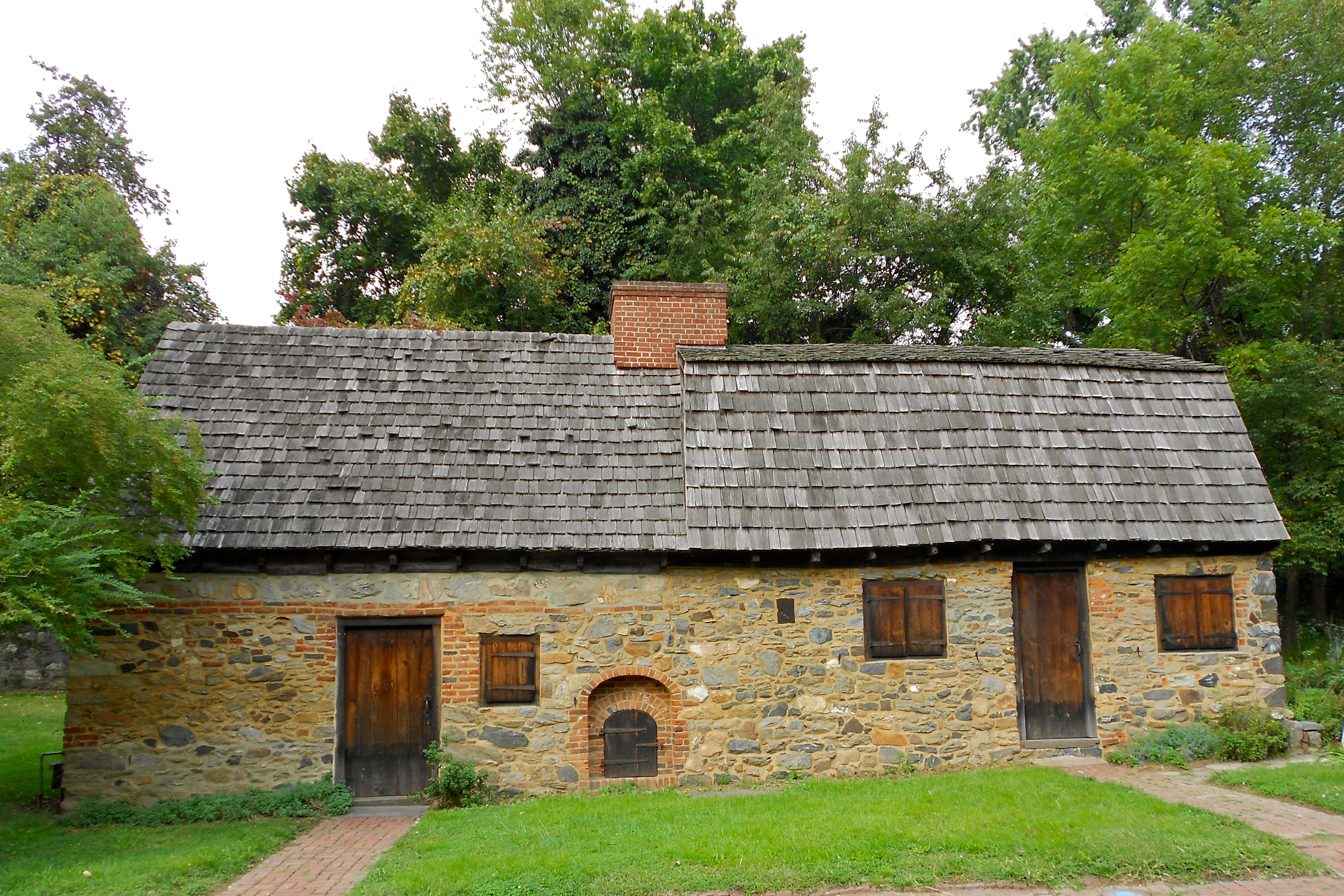
The Caleb Pusey house is the oldest existing structure known to have been visited by William Penn

- Caleb Pusey House
- Crozer Arboretum
- Crozer Chester Medical Center
- Crozer Theological Seminary
- John P. Crozer II Mansion
- Upland Baptist Church

== Notable people ==
- Clarence D. Bell, former Pennsylvania State Senator
- Danny Murtaugh, Pittsburgh Pirates player and manager, died in Upland
- John Price Crozer, textile manufacturer and philanthropist
- John K. Hagerty, former Pennsylvania State Representative
- Heather Lind, actress, Boardwalk Empire and TURN
- George Plafker, geologist and seismologist

== Other sources ==
- Jordan, John W. A History of Delaware County, Pennsylvania (Lewis Historical Publishing Company, New York. 1914)
- Ward, Christopher L. New Sweden on the Delaware (Philadelphia: University of Pennsylvania Press, 1938)
- Armstrong, Edward; William H. Denny The Record of the Court at Upland, in Pennsylvania. 1676 to 1681 (Kessinger Pub Company. 2007) ISBN 0-548-29249-3
