= Chester Creek =

Stream in Pennsylvania, United States

Coordinates: 39.892156°N 75.442257°W

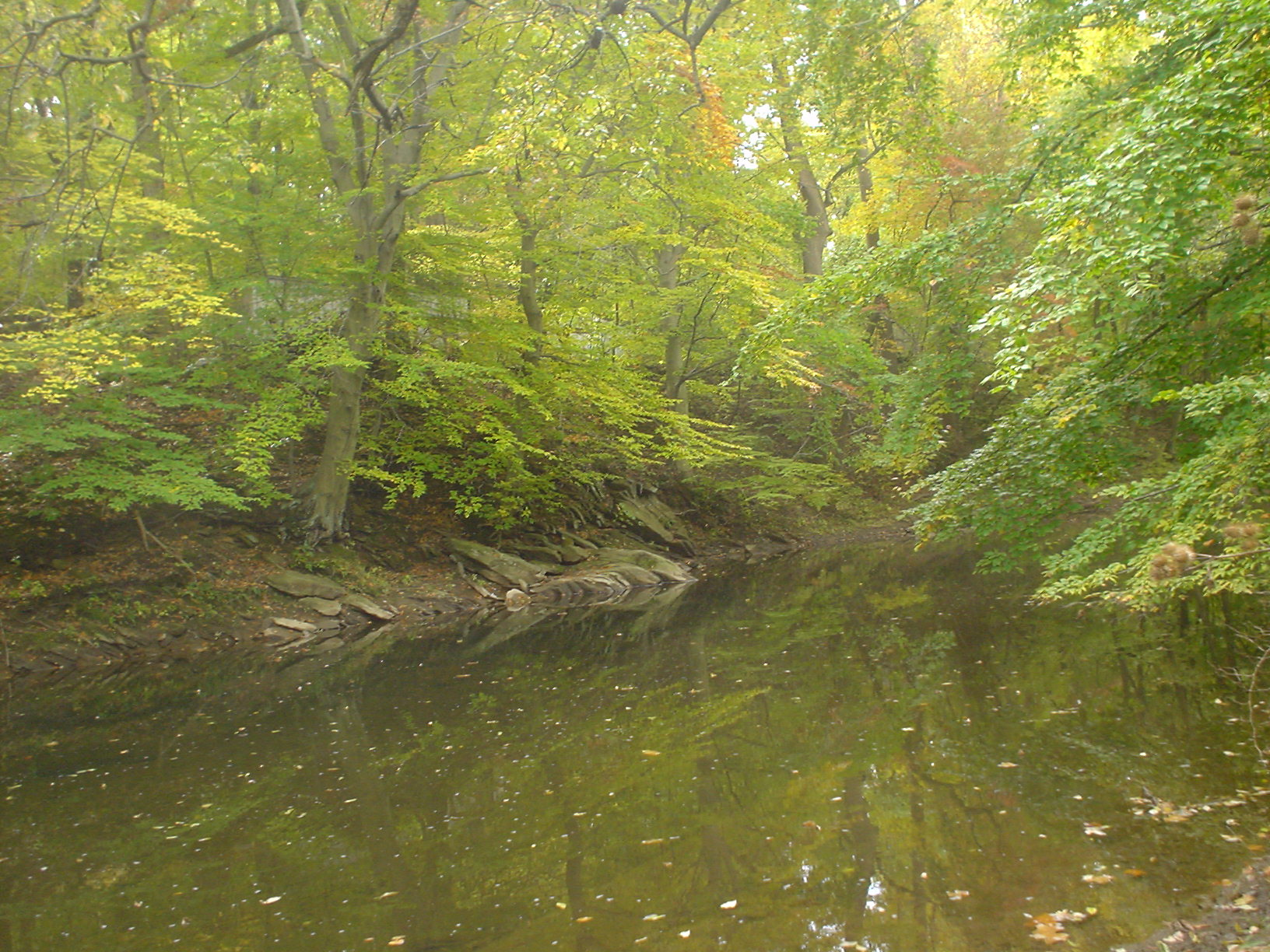
Chester Creek near Upland, Pennsylvania

Chester Creek is a 9.4-mile-long (15.1 km) tributary of the Delaware River in Delaware County, Pennsylvania, in the United States.

== East Branch Chester Creek ==
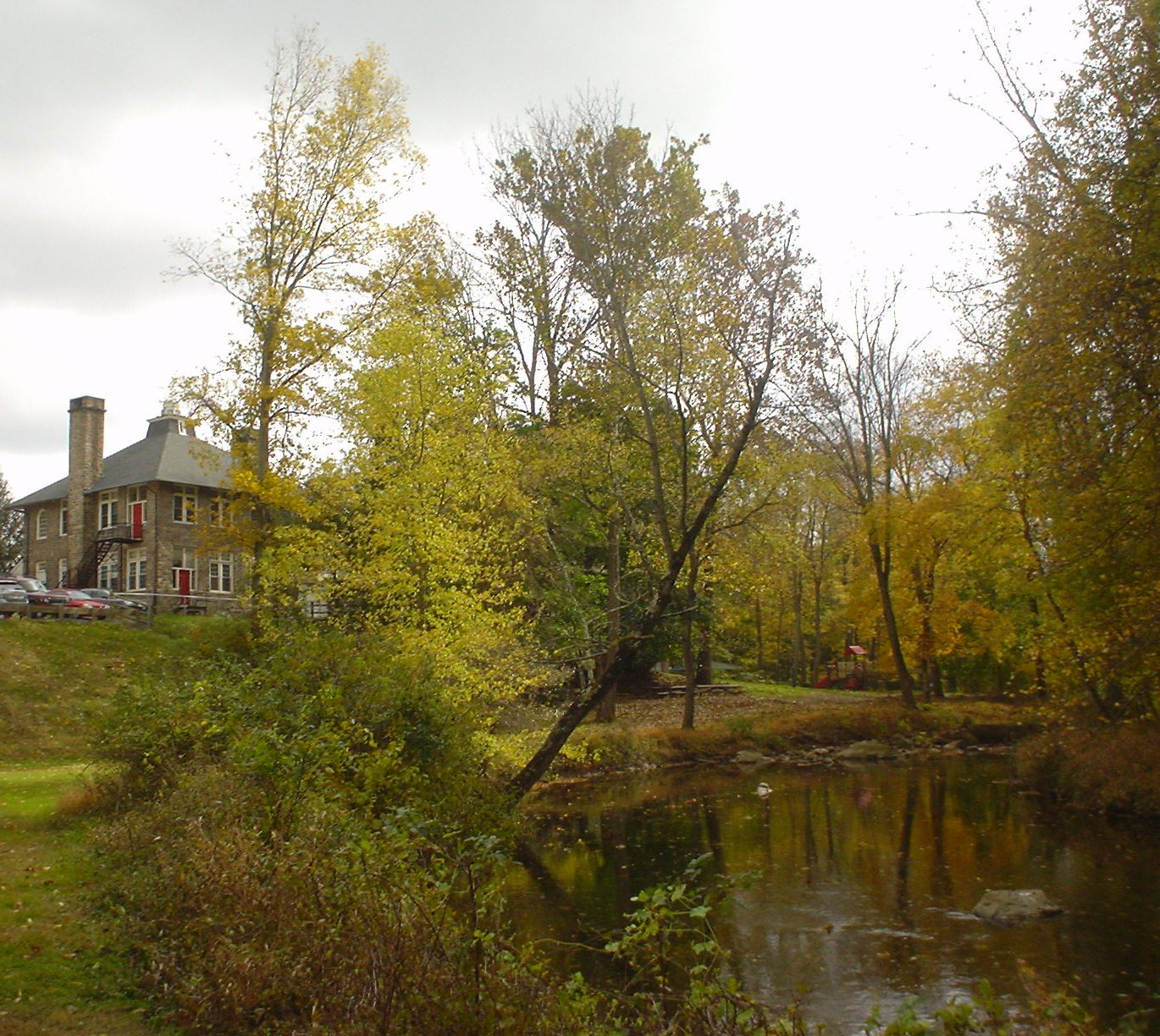
By the Malvern School in Thornbury Township

The East Branch of Chester Creek is 17.1 miles (27.5 km) long. Rising near Kirkland, it crosses under the junction of U.S. Route 202 and Pennsylvania Route 100. Just below, it is dammed to form the West Chester Reservoir. Flowing southward, it is dammed just above the Pennsylvania Route 3 crossing to form the Milltown Reservoir. It flows south from there to Westtown, where Goose Creek enters and the former West Chester and Philadelphia Railroad (now owned by SEPTA) runs alongside it. The stream runs easterly about two miles, then turns south and passes a large stone quarry at Glen Mills.

== West Branch Chester Creek ==
The 9.1-mile-long (14.6 km) West Branch originates near Dilworthtown, in Chester County and flows generally eastward. Just before entering Delaware County, it is dammed to form Brinton Lake. At Markham, Webb Creek enters at the site of the historic Newlin Grist Mill. From here to Chester Heights, the creek is paralleled by the abandoned right-of-way of the Octoraro Branch, damaged in flooding from Hurricane Agnes in 1972. The creek loops southward in a deep gorge to skirt the "Heights" and comes north to meet the East Branch below Lenni.

== Main stream ==
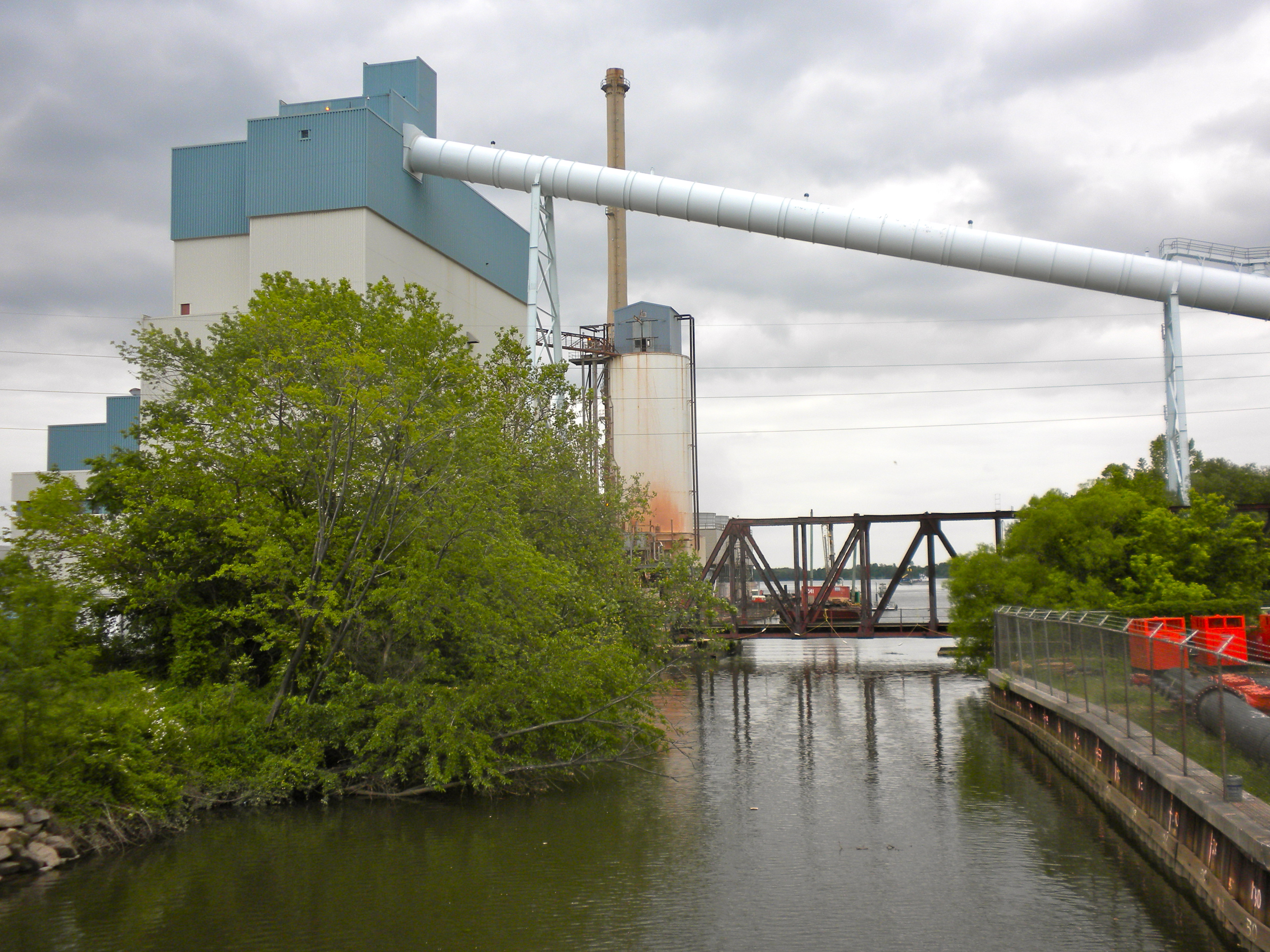
Mouth of Chester Creek in Chester

The two branches converge between Lenni and Glen Riddle. The main stream winds southward and eastward through a rocky gorge, formerly the site of many mills that tapped its power. The Chester Creek Railroad (later the Chester Creek Branch of the Pennsylvania Railroad), built in 1869, paralleled it from Lenni to Upland, where it turned away from the creek. In 1972 the rail line was severely damaged by flooding from Hurricane Agnes.

Chester Creek joins the tidal Delaware River at the Port of Chester in Chester.

== History ==
The original Indian name of Chester Creek was Meechoppenackhan which means "the large potato stream" or "the stream along which large potatoes grow", where "potatoes" refers to the tubers of Apios americana, commonly known as American groundnut, potato bean, or Indian potato.

The lower watershed of the creek served as a tobacco plantation beginning in 1644. The land on the west bank of the creek was deeded to John Ammundson Besk and family on August 20, 1653. Swedish settlers were the first non-natives to live in the area.

In 1729 one of the earliest paper mills established in the American colonies was built by Thomas Wilcox on this creek.

== Ecology ==
Ironically (as Chester is largely associated with pollution and industry), Chester Creek is undoubtedly, the healthiest of the nearby Pennsylvania-originating creeks (Darby, Crum, Ridley, and Chester) that feed into the Delaware River. Of these nearby creeks, its banks look the closest to how they would have when William Penn arrived in Pennsylvania in 1681, with many boulders, non-eroded gradients between water and land, and native vegetation along the creek.

While all streams and rivers in Pennsylvania natively boasted a presence of Brook Trout, only Chester Creek still most-likely holds this feat. Furthermore, Freshwater Eels are still making their pilgrimage up the river, with sightings in both the East and West Branches, many miles upstream. These two facts alone indicate a very healthy ecosystem.

== Tributaries ==
=== East Branch ===
- Goose Creek
- Westtown Run
- Hickman Run
- Forsythe Run
- Rocky Run

=== West Branch ===
- Green Creek
- Webb Creek (known as Concord Creek on USGS publications)
- Deborahs Run

=== Main stream ===
- Crum Run
- Chrome Run
- Baldwin Run

== See also ==
- List of rivers of Pennsylvania
- List of Delaware River tributaries
