= Conrad Henry Moehlman =

American historian

Conrad Henry Moehlman, 1952

Conrad Henry Moehlman (May 26, 1879 – September 19, 1961) was an American professor of church history at Colgate Rochester Divinity School, where he was emeritus professor. A Baptist and known as theologically liberal, he was a strong proponent of the separation of church and state and wrote a number of books on religion and education, church history, and Christianity.

== Life ==
Moehlman was born in Meriden, Connecticut. He graduated from the University of Michigan in 1902 with a Bachelor of Arts degree. He received a Bachelor of Divinity degree from the Baptist Rochester Theological Seminary in 1905 and two years later, began teaching Hebrew and Old Testament history there. Moehlman received his PhD from the University of Michigan in 1918. After the departure of Walter Rauschenbusch, Moehlman became the professor of church history at Rochester, which later merged with Colgate University. An active member of the American Society of Church History, Moehlman was the organization's president in 1933.

After retiring from Colgate Rochester in 1944, he went on to teach at the University of Rochester, University of Southern California and Oberlin College. He taught in fields such as Hebrew literature, Biblical languages, New Testament interpretation, and church history.

Theologically liberal, Moehlman was dedicated to the separation of church and state. He wrote a number of books on Christianity, religion and education, and church history. His book The Christian-Jewish Tragedy: A Study in Religious Prejudice (1933—see Publications below) was praised by Rabbi Philip S. Bernstein in a letter to the editor, Democrat & Chronicle, Rochester, NY, September 25, 1961: "He was the first American Christian scholar to undertake a serious study of the impact of religious teaching on religious prejudice... He demonstrated the effect of certain Christian doctrines and observances on ani-Semitism.... Many were shocked to learn that ancient phrases to which they had long been habituated, created and perpetuated ugly stereotypes of other groups.... He possessed absolute intellectual integrity, with the moral courage to back it up." See also his article, "Contemporary American Protestantism and Anti-Semitism," in Religious Education (39:2, 1944, pp. 82–83).

Moehlman engaged in a 3-way forum with Rabbi Philip Bernstein and Clarence Darrow (billed as an agnostic), chaired by David Rhys Williams, at the Rochester Convention Center on May 31, 1932, which attracted "some 2000 persons" according to an account in the Democrat & Chronicle, Rochester, NY, June 1, 1932. The article went on to say: "When Doctor Moehlman had completed telling why he was a Christian, Mr. Darrow said he would be willing to subscribe to Doctor Moehlman's theology, but was very much in doubt if the Christian Church would...."

He was married to Bertha Young Moehlman, who died in 1949. He married Carol Webster in 1953, who outlived him. He and Bertha had four children: Arthur Henry Moehlman (1907–1978), a professor of history and philosophy at the University of Texas at Austin; Robert S. Moehlman (1910–1986), a geologist and oil exploration company executive; Frederick Moehlman, who died of diphtheria in 1920 at about age 7; and Grace Moehlman Forbes (1915–1994) who married Gilbert B. Forbes (1915–2003), a noted pediatrician. A granddaughter, Constance F. Citro, is a noted statistician. Moehlman died in Avon Park, Florida in 1961 and is buried in Riverside Cemetery in Rochester, NY.

== Publications (partial list) ==
- The combination Theos Soter as Explanation of the Primitive Christian use of Soter as Title and Name of Jesus
- Is the Study of the History of Christianity Practical? (1925)
- A Syllabus Of The History of Christianity (1926)
- The Unknown Bible, a Study of the Problem of Attitude Toward the Bible (1926)
- The Story of the Ten Commandments: A Study of the Hebrew Decalogue in its Ancient and Modern Application (1928)
- The Catholic-Protestant Mind: Some Aspects of Religious Liberty in the United States (1929)
- The Christian-Jewish tragedy: A Study in Religious Prejudice (1933)
- Baptist View of the State (1935)
- The American Constitutions and Religion: Religious References in the Charters of the Thirteen Colonies and the Constitutions of the Forty-eight States (1938)
- In Defense of the American Way of Life (1939)
- Protestantism's Challenge: An Historical Study of the Survival Value of Protestantism (1939)
- School and Church: the American Way — An Historical Approach to the Problem of Religious Instruction in Public Education (1944)
- The Church as Educator (1947)
- Sayings of Jesus (1950)
- The Wall of Separation Between Church and State: An Historical Study of Recent Criticism of the Religious Clause of the First Amendment (Beacon Studies in Freedom and Power) (1951)
- Ordeal by Concordance: An Historical Study of a Recent Literary Invention (1955)
- How Jesus became God: An Historical Study of the Life of Jesus to the Age of Constantine (1960)
