= Cedar Grove Cemetery (University of Notre Dame) =

Cemetery in St. Joseph County, Indiana, US

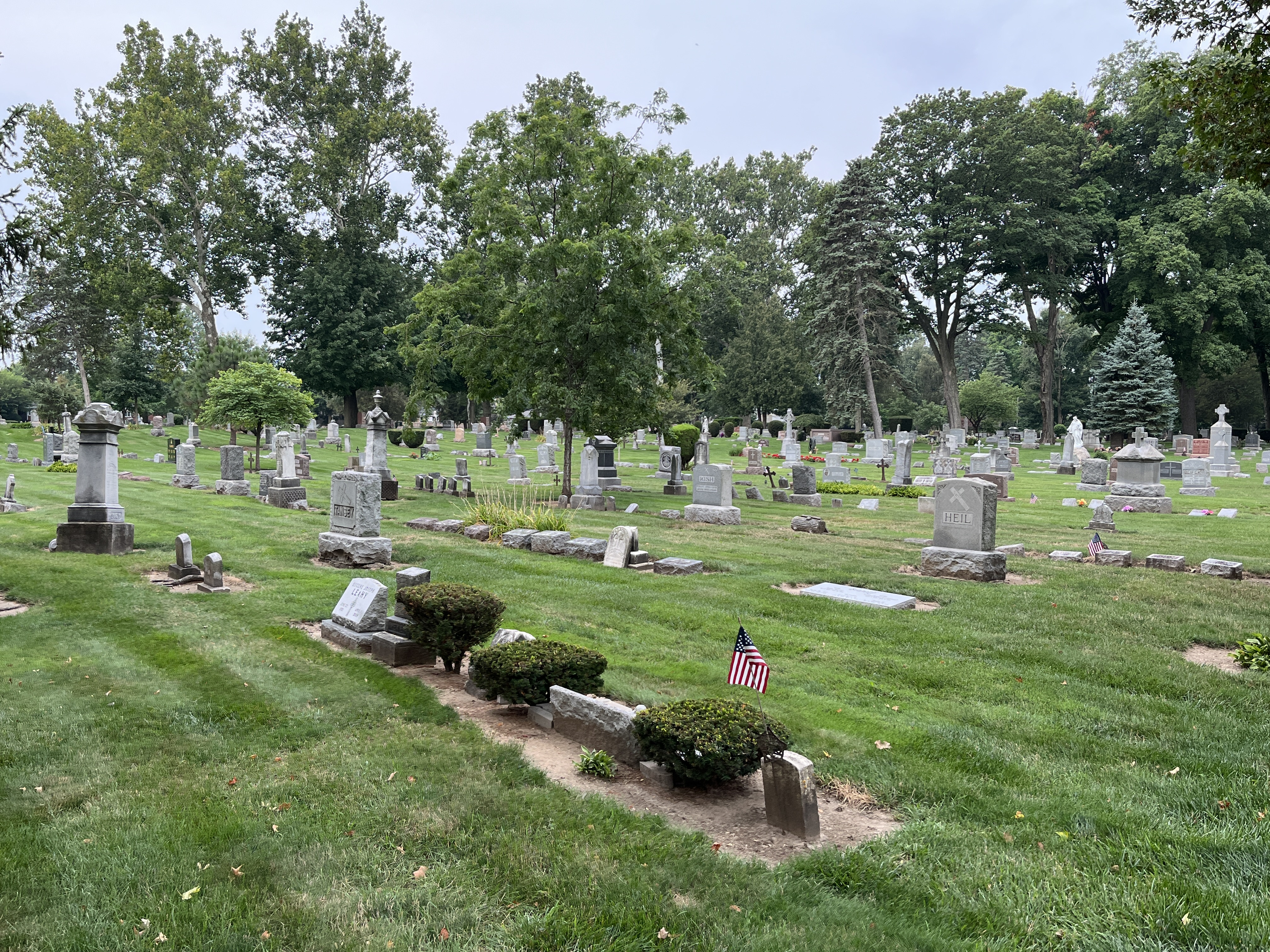
- The cemetery in 2023
- Interactive map of Cedar Grove Cemetery

Details
- Location: Notre Dame, Indiana
- Country: United States
- Coordinates: 41°41′40″N 86°14′25″W

Cedar Grove Cemetery is a cemetery on the University of Notre Dame campus in Notre Dame, Indiana. The 22-acre cemetery opened in c. 1844.

== History ==
The cemetery was established in 1843 by Rev. Edward Sorin, soon after he founded the university.

Brothers of the congregation also established a mortuary, one of the first in Indiana. Throughout the 19th and 20th centuries it was a Catholic cemetery open to the public. In 1977 ownership was transferred from the Congregation to the university. At this time it became a private cemetery, and burials were reserved for Notre Dame faculty, staff, and retirees with the requisite years of service. Despite recent expansions that brought it to 22 acres, space is very limited. In response to persistent requests, in recent years it has been opened to Notre Dame alumni with the creation of four mausoleums complexes.

== Burials ==
- Alexis Coquillard (1795–1855), founder of South Bend, Indiana
- Joe Boland (1904–1960), football player and coach
- Dave Duerson (1960–2011), football player
- Arthur Erich Haas (1884–1941), scientist
- Knute Rockne (1888–1931), American football player and coach
- Leon Hart (1928–2002), football player
- Lou Holtz (1937–2026), football coach
- Joe Kernan (1946–2020), politician
- Moose Krause (1913–1992), basketball player
- Ray Lemek (1934–2005), football player
- Ralph McInerny (1929–2010), author
- Ara Parseghian (1923–2017), college football coach
- Dick Rosenthal (1933–2024), basketball player
- Regis Philbin (1931–2020), television presenter
- Arunas Vasys (1943–2024), football player
- Catherine LaCugna (1952–1997), Catholic theologian
