= Constance Citro =

American political scientist and statistician

- Born: Constance Ann Forbes; June 9, 1942 (age 84); St. Louis, Missouri, U.S.
- Education: University of Rochester; Yale University (PhD)
- Spouse: Joseph F. Citro (m. 1965-2020; his death)
- Children: 1
- Scientific career
- Fields: Statistics; Political science
- Workplaces: National Academies of Sciences, Engineering, and Medicine

Constance ("Connie") F. Citro (née Constance Ann Forbes; born June 9, 1942) is an American political scientist and statistician. She is the former director of the Committee on National Statistics of the National Academies of Sciences, Engineering, and Medicine and works as a senior scholar for the Committee on National Statistics. She also works as an independent consultant and is currently a member of the project team for the American Statistical Association Project on Assessing the Health of the Federal Statistical Agencies.

== Education and career ==
Constance Ann Forbes was born on June 9, 1942, in St. Louis, Missouri, to Gilbert B. Forbes, a pediatrician, and Grace (Moehlman) Forbes. She was the granddaughter of Baptist minister and theological scholar Conrad Henry Moehlman.

She studied political science as an undergraduate at the University of Rochester, graduating Phi Beta Kappa and summa cum laude in 1963. Her father was on the faculty of the U of R Medical School, and numerous relatives were graduates, including both her parents, her late husband, Joseph F. Citro (1941-2020), whom she married on June 19, 1965, and their son, Jeremy F. Citro. She went to Yale University for a master's degree and Ph.D. in political science, studying under James David Barber.

Citro joined the Committee on National Statistics in 1984 and directed the committee from 2004 to 2017. She was previously vice president of Mathematica Policy Research, vice president of Data Use and Access Laboratories (DUALabs), and social science analyst with the US Census Bureau.

== Recognition ==
Citro became a Fellow of the American Statistical Association in 1987. She is an elected member of the International Statistical Institute.

She won the 1997 Roger Herriot Award for Innovation in Federal Statistics, for contributions including directing panel studies on poverty measurement, microsimulation for social welfare programs, and the 1990 and 2000 censuses. She won the Waksberg Award in survey methodology in 2014.

In 2018, the American Statistical Association established an annual award, the Links Lecture Award, "to honor the contributions of Constance Citro, Robert Groves, and Fritz Scheuren".

Citro was selected to give the 32nd Morris Hansen Lecture on September 26, 2024. Her topic was: "Challenges in Measuring Income and Poverty: Why Is It So Hard? Why Is It So Important?".
