= Albert Nicholas Arnold =

American clergyman

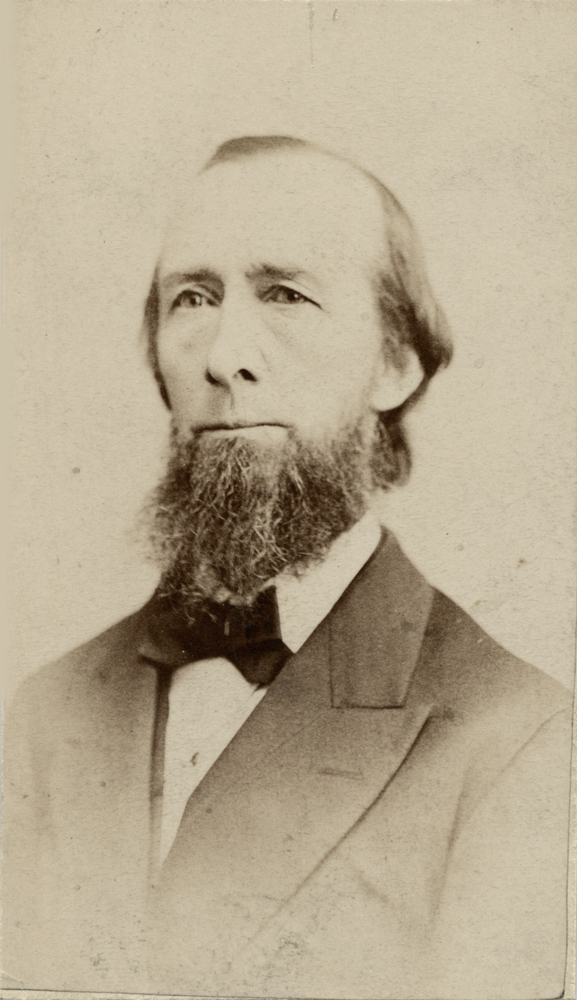
- Born: February 12, 1814; Cranston
- Died: October 11, 1883 (aged 69); Cranston

Albert Nicholas Arnold (February 12, 1814 – October 11, 1883) was a Baptist minister.

Albert Nicholas Arnold was born on February 12, 1814 in Cranston, Rhode Island. He graduated from Brown University in 1838, studied at Newton Theological Seminary, and on 14 Sept., 1841, was ordained pastor of the Baptist church at Newburyport, Mass. From 1844 to 1854 he was a missionary to Greece, from 1855 to 1857 he was professor of church history at Newton Seminary, and in 1858 he became pastor at Westborough, Mass., where he remained until 1864. He was then chosen professor of biblical interpretation and pastoral theology in the Baptist Seminary at Hamilton, N. Y., and from 1869 to 1873 held the professorship of New Testament Greek in Baptist theological seminary at Chicago. Arnold published, in 1860, Prerequisites to Communion, in 1871 One Woman's Mission, and in 1889, Commentary on the Epistle to the Romans with David Barnes Ford. Albert Nicholas Arnold died on 11 October 1883 in Cranston.
