= Augustus Rauschenbusch =

German Baptist minister (1816–1899)

Karl August Heinrich Rauschenbusch (13 February 1816, in Altena – 5 December 1899, in Wandsbek), better known as Augustus Rauschenbusch in English, was a German Baptist (Lutheran early in his career) clergyman who worked mostly in the United States.

== Biography ==
He graduated from the gymnasium at Elberfeld, and at 19 went to the University of Berlin to study for the Lutheran ministry. Subsequently, he spent some time at the University of Bonn in the study of natural science and theology. On the death of his father, who was a Lutheran pastor in Altena, the son was chosen in 1841 as his successor. His ministry here, while fruitful in spiritual results, excited so much opposition, and was so hampered by his ecclesiastical relations, that he resolved to emigrate to the United States.

He arrived in the U.S. in 1846, and preached for some time to the Germans in Missouri. In 1847 he moved to New York City, where he edited the German tracts published by the American Tract Society. While he was residing in New York, his views on the question of baptism underwent a change, and in 1850 he entered the Baptist communion, though retaining his connection with the Tract Society until 1853. From 1853 to 1858, he served German Baptist churches in Missouri. In 1858 he was called to take charge of the German department of Rochester Theological Seminary, which place he continued to fill until 1888. He received the honorary degree of D.D. from the University of Rochester.

In 1890 he returned to Germany, where he devoted himself to literary work.

== Works ==
- Geschichte der Erzväter (New York, 1859)
- Die Bedeutung des Fusswaschens Christi (Hamburg, 1861)
- Die Vorläufer der Reformation (Cleveland, 1875)
- Gehören die Apokryphen in der Bibel hinein (Hamburg, 1895)
- Die Entstehung der Kindertaufe (1897)
- Biblische Frauenbilder (1897)
- Die Entstehung der Kindertaufe im 3. Jahrhundert nach Christum and die Wiedereinführung der biblischen Taufe im 17. Jahrhundert (1898)
- Handbüchlein der Homiletik für freikirchliche Prediger und für Stadtmissionäre (Cassel, 1900)

== Family ==
He is the father of Baptist clergyman Walter Rauschenbusch.
