= Village Gate Square =

Mixed-use complex in Rochester, New York

- Interactive map of the Village Gate Square area

General information
- Status: Active
- Location: 274 North Goodman Street, Rochester, New York 14607
- Coordinates: 43.1585°N 77.5932°W
- Year built: c. 1900
- Renovated: 1981
- Owner: Stern Properties

Website
- sternproperties.com

Village Gate Square is a mixed-use development in the Neighborhood of the Arts (NOTA) district of Rochester, New York, United States. The complex occupies seven former industrial buildings on a 14-acre (5.7 ha) site totaling more than 500,000 square feet (46,000 m^{2}) of space. Originally built around 1900 as the Rochester plant of the Stecher-Traung Lithographic Corporation, the complex was converted into a commercial and residential center in 1981 by developer Gary Stern. Village Gate Square houses restaurants, retail shops, art studios, technology firms, offices, and residential loft apartments, and is credited with helping to spark the revitalization of the surrounding neighborhood.

== History ==
=== Stecher Lithographic Company ===
In 1871, Charles F. Muntz, Frank A. Stecher, and Anton Rahn founded Charles F. Muntz & Company as a chromolithography firm in Rochester. The partnership was reorganized as Mensing, Rahn & Stecher in 1874, and in late 1886 the firm incorporated as the Stecher Lithographic Company. The company opened a plant on St. Paul Street in 1882 and grew to become one of the world's largest lithographic printing operations, producing labels, posters, and decorative fruit and flower plates.

During the 1920s and 1930s, the Traung Label and Lithography Company of San Francisco merged with Stecher to form the Stecher-Traung Lithographic Corporation. In 1966, Schmidt Lithograph was acquired and the company became Stecher-Traung-Schmidt. The Rochester plant ceased operations in 1980, leaving the large industrial complex vacant.

=== Conversion ===
In 1981, Rochester developer Gary Stern purchased the vacant complex at a price of $1.50 per square foot. Stern was inspired by Larimer Square in Denver, a pioneering adaptive reuse project developed by Dana Crawford. Rather than following a formal master plan, Stern allowed Village Gate to evolve organically. The first and second floors initially operated as a flea market, then shifted to antique shops before developing into the diverse tenant mix that characterizes the complex today.

Stern subsequently acquired adjacent former factory buildings, including those of the Schlegel Manufacturing Company (an automobile upholstery maker) and the American Chicle Company (a chewing gum manufacturer), expanding the complex to its present scale. The rehabilitation, which cost approximately $10.5 million, was carried out in partnership with the Leighton Design Group.

=== Expansion and recent development ===
In 2010, the Lofts at Village Gate residential apartments opened, adding housing to the complex.

Around 2016, a $10.2 million expansion added three new mixed-use buildings comprising approximately 52,000 square feet (4,800 m^{2}) of space, along with new lighting, landscaping, and more than 200 additional parking spaces. LeFrois Builders served as the project manager for the expansion.

In 2018, Safran Federal Systems established its headquarters at 320 North Goodman Street within the complex. The company expanded its operations by approximately 10,000 square feet (930 m^{2}) in 2024.

In 2019, Colgate Rochester Crozer Divinity School relocated to an 11,000-square-foot (1,000 m^{2}) space at Village Gate, though the school subsequently moved to the Sibley Triangle Building in 2023.

== Tenants ==
Village Gate Square houses a mix of restaurants, specialty retail, technology companies, professional offices, art studios, and residential apartments. Dining establishments have included Lento, California Rollin', and Carnegie Cellars, among others. Technology tenants include Safran Federal Systems and Dataflow Inc. The upper floors contain artist studios and galleries, while the Lofts at Village Gate offer one- and two-bedroom residential units ranging from approximately 1,140 to 2,160 square feet (106 to 201 m^{2}).

A second-floor glass-enclosed atrium serves as an event space with a capacity of up to 450 people. The complex also features a central outdoor courtyard with bistro lighting and public art installations.

== Architecture ==
The buildings retain their original exterior appearance dating to circa 1900. Interior spaces preserve exposed industrial ceilings and structural elements. When the second floor was removed to create the atrium, the original wood flooring, beams, and steel were salvaged and reused elsewhere in the complex. Common areas feature brightly colored structural poles and art installations suspended from ceilings.

== Neighborhood ==
Village Gate Square is situated in the Neighborhood of the Arts, a cultural district spanning approximately 15 blocks in length and three blocks in width on Rochester's east side. Nearby institutions include the Rochester Public Market, the Memorial Art Gallery, the George Eastman Museum, and Writers & Books.

The complex is widely credited with catalyzing the revitalization of the surrounding area. As recently as the 1990s, the neighborhood was considered blighted and marred by abandoned and decaying industrial buildings. City of Rochester Director Dana Miller has stated: "Gary Stern took a risk and he bet on Rochester."

== Gary Stern ==
Gary Stern (1943–2016) founded Stern Properties and developed Village Gate Square over the course of more than three decades. Stern died on November 3, 2016, at the age of 73. His son Allan Stern succeeded him as the operator of Stern Properties and Village Gate Square.

On June 7, 2019, the City of Rochester designated a portion of College Avenue adjacent to the complex as "Gary Stern Way" in recognition of his contributions to the neighborhood.

== See also ==
- Neighborhood of the Arts
- Rochester, New York
- Adaptive reuse
- Larimer Square
