= Joe Boland =

American football player, coach, and broadcaster (1904–1960)

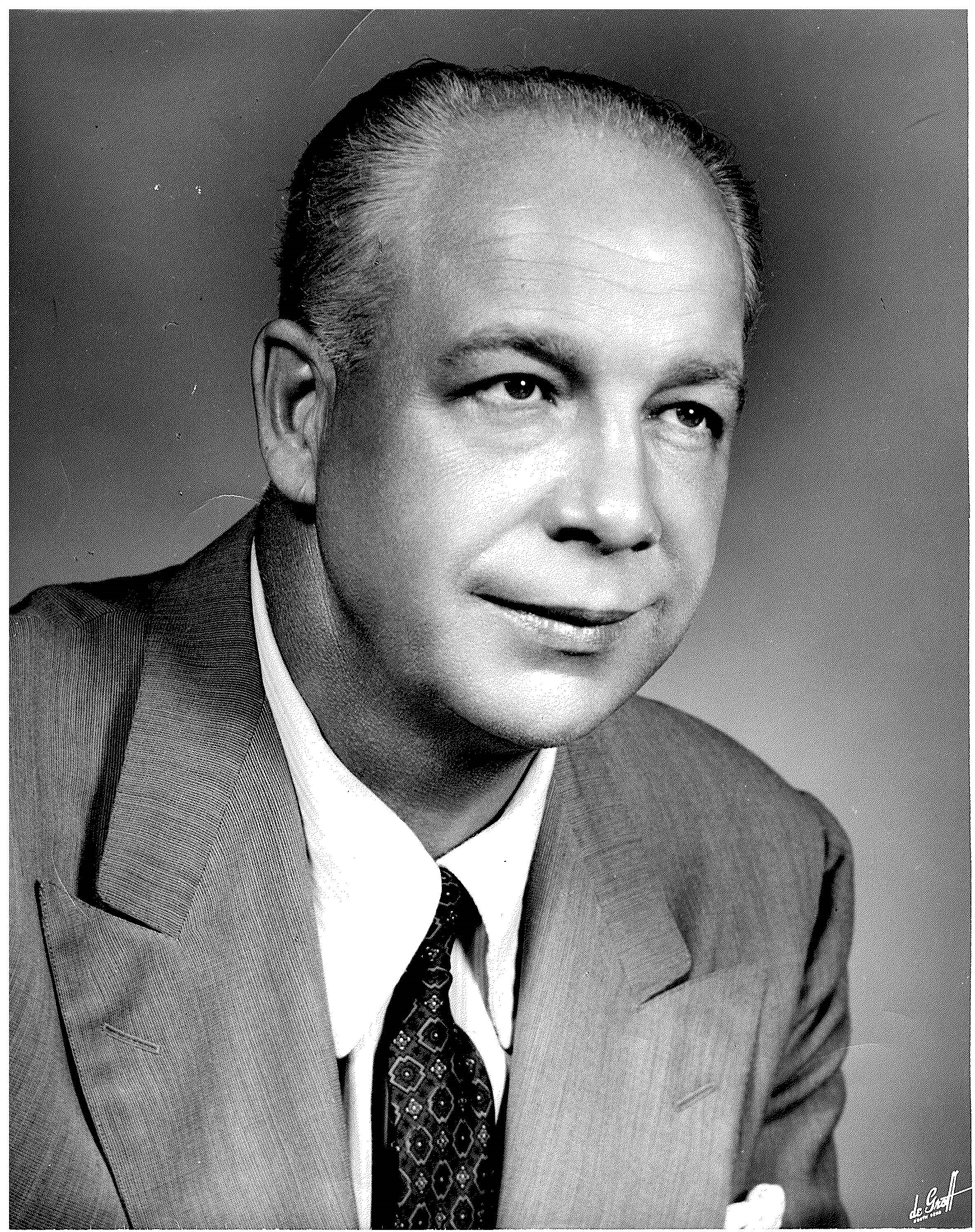
- Boland in his later years

Biographical details
- Born: September 7, 1904; Philadelphia, Pennsylvania, U.S.
- Died: February 29, 1960 (aged 55); South Bend, Indiana, U.S.

Playing career

Football
- 1924–1925: Notre Dame

Coaching career (HC unless noted)

Football
- 1929–1932: St. Thomas (MN)
- 1934–1940: Notre Dame (line)

Ice hockey
- 1932–1933: St. Thomas (MN)

Head coaching record
- Overall: 22–9–2 (football)

Accomplishments and honors

Championships
- As coach: MIAC (1930); As player: National (1924)

Joseph Martin Boland (September 7, 1904 – February 26, 1960) was an American football player and coach and sports broadcaster. He played on the 1924 Notre Dame Fighting Irish football team coached by Knute Rockne. Boland was also a shot putter for the Notre Dame Fighting Irish track and field team, finishing 6th at the 1926 NCAA Track and Field Championships.

Boland also served as the head football coach at the University of St. Thomas in St. Paul, Minnesota from 1929 to 1932. He also served as the offensive line coach at his alma mater, the University of Notre Dame from 1934 to 1940 under the head coach of Elmer Layden. After his coaching career, he conceived and started the Irish Football Network becoming the first voice of Notre Dame, as well as calling the Chicago Cardinals games of the National Football League (NFL).

Boland died of a heart attack on February 26, 1960, and was buried at Cedar Grove Cemetery.

He was posthumously inducted into the Indiana Football Hall of Fame on June 7, 2024.

== Head coaching record ==
=== Football ===
Year	Team	Overall	Conference	Standing	Bowl/playoffs
St. Thomas Cadets/Tommies (Minnesota Intercollegiate Athletic Conference) (1929)
1929	St. Thomas	7–2	4–2	3rd	
1930	St. Thomas	6–2	4–0	T–1st	
1931	St. Thomas	4–3–1	3–1	T–2nd	
1932	St. Thomas	5–2–1	3–1	T–2nd	
St. Thomas:		22–9–2	14–4		
Total:		22–9–2			
National championship Conference title Conference division title or championship game berth

== Gallery ==
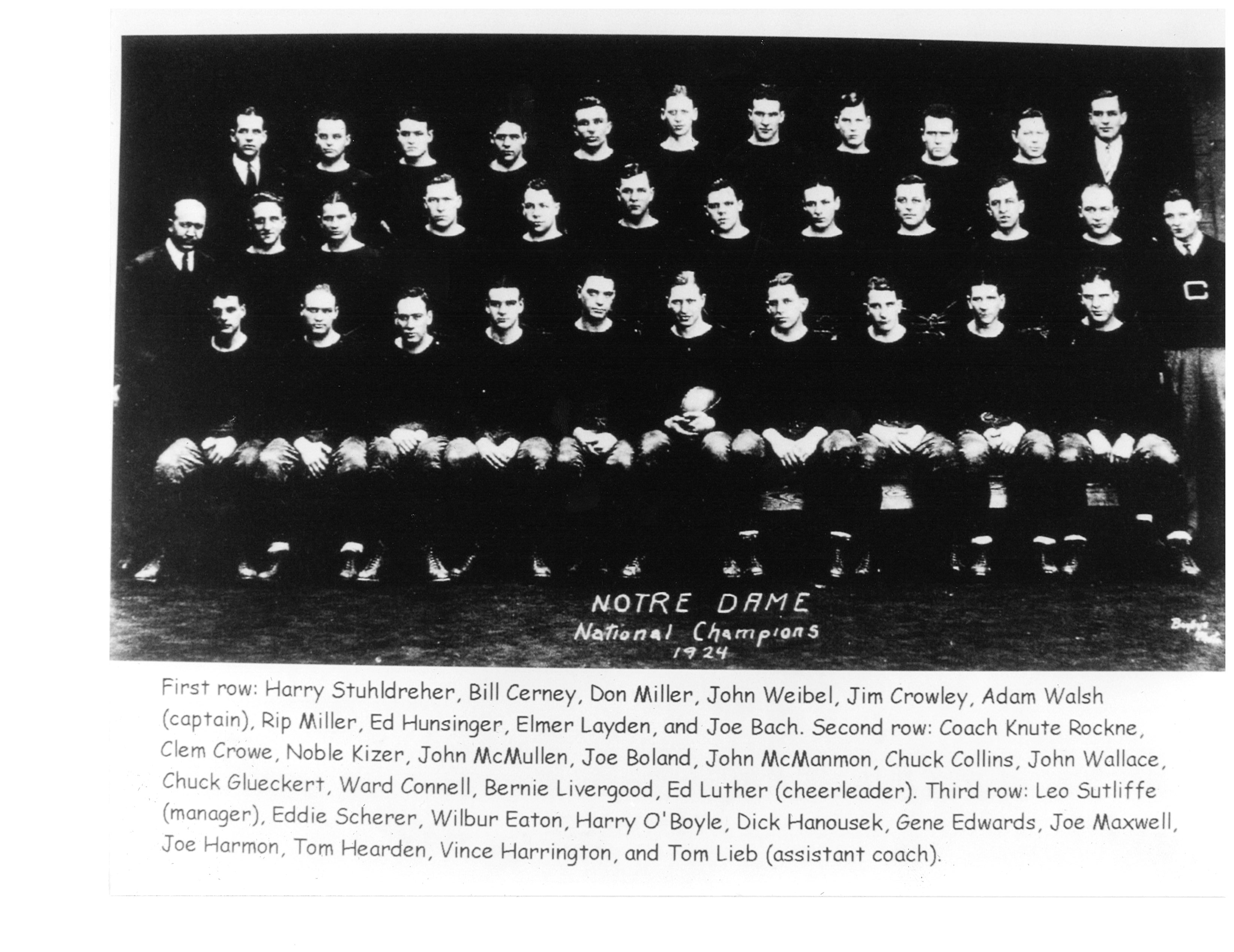
Team picture of the Notre Dame football team 1924 national championship team with Joe Boland and Knute Rockne

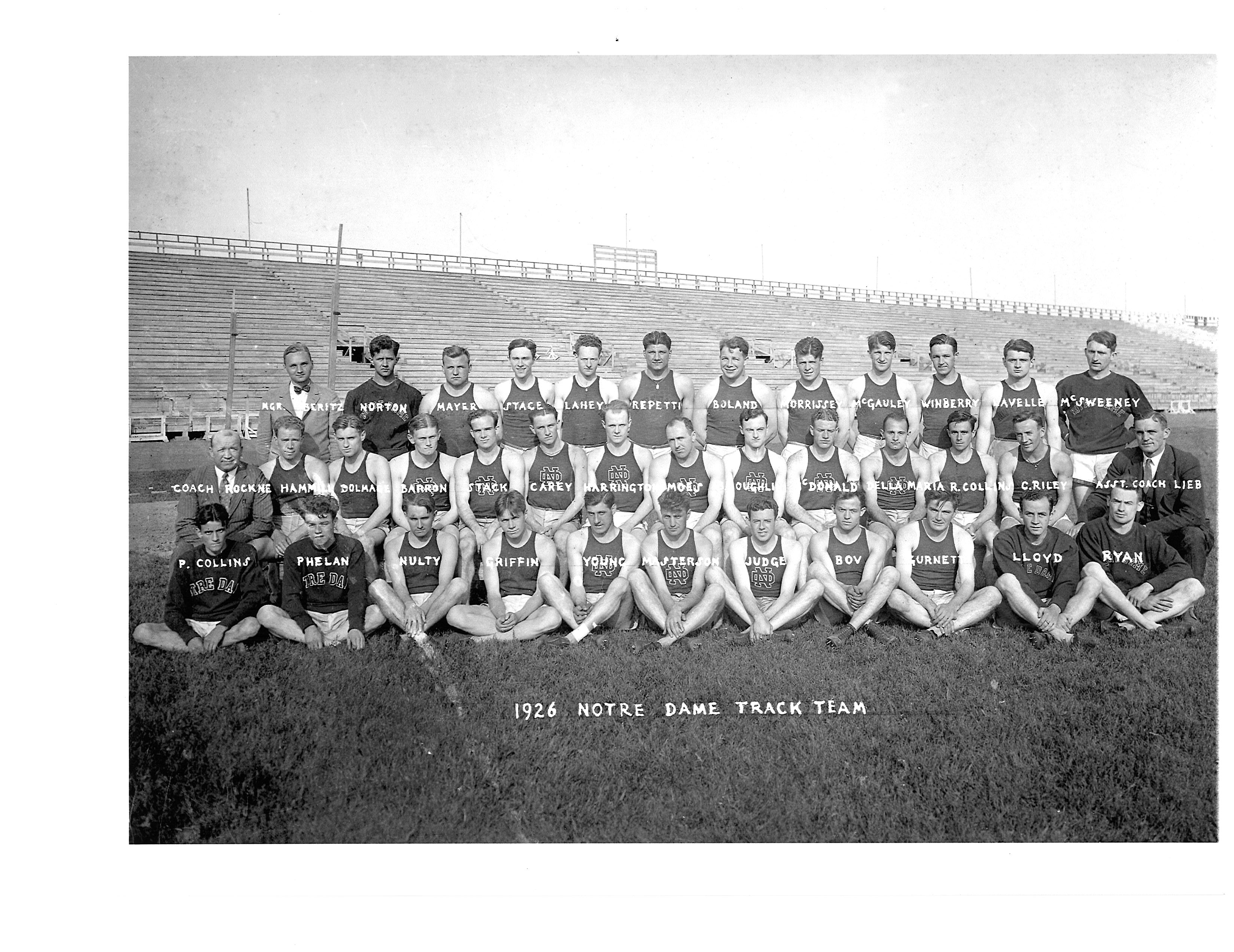
Team Picture of 1926 Notre Dame track team

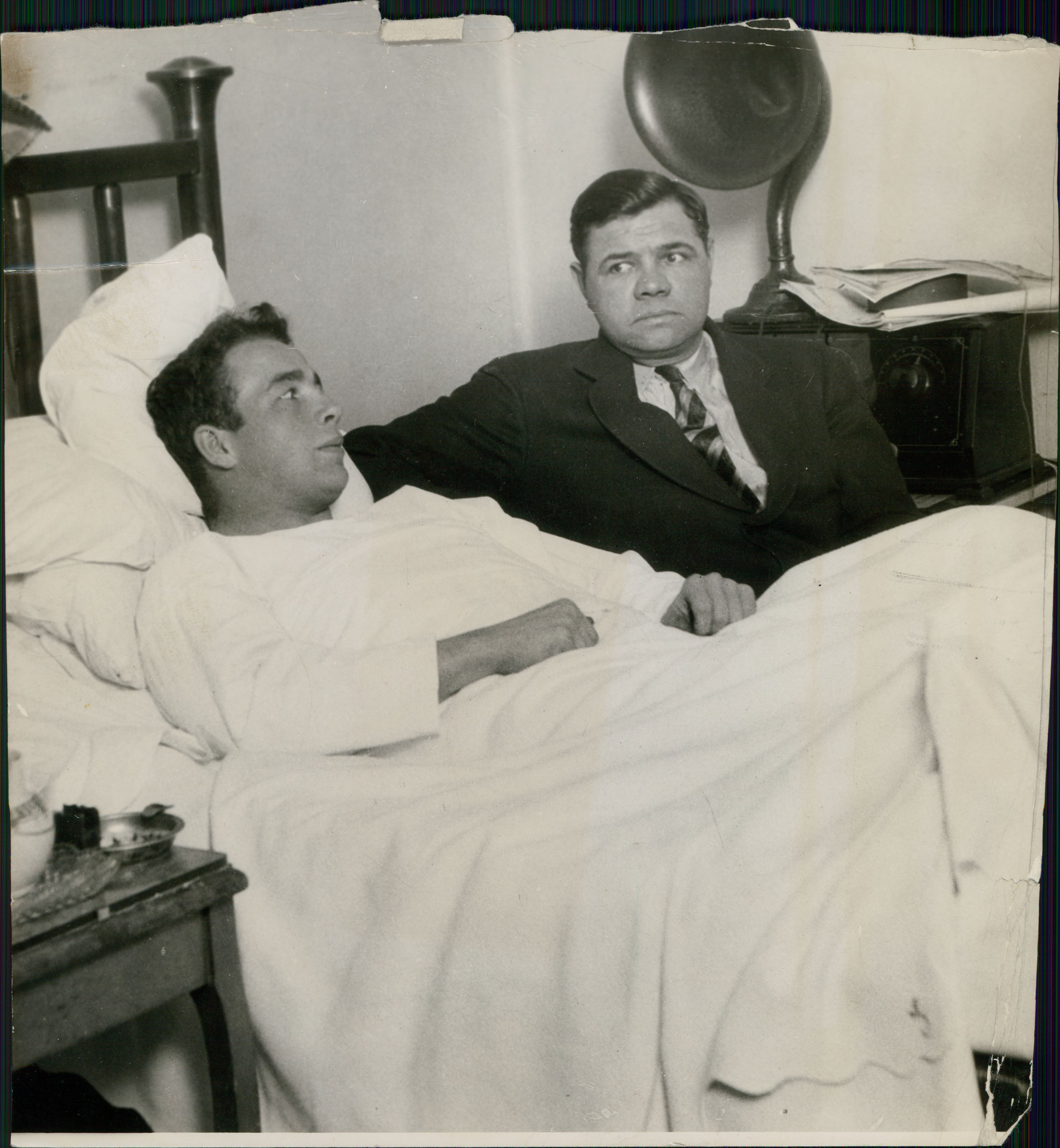
Joe Boland being visited by Babe Ruth in the hospital after his leg injury in 1926

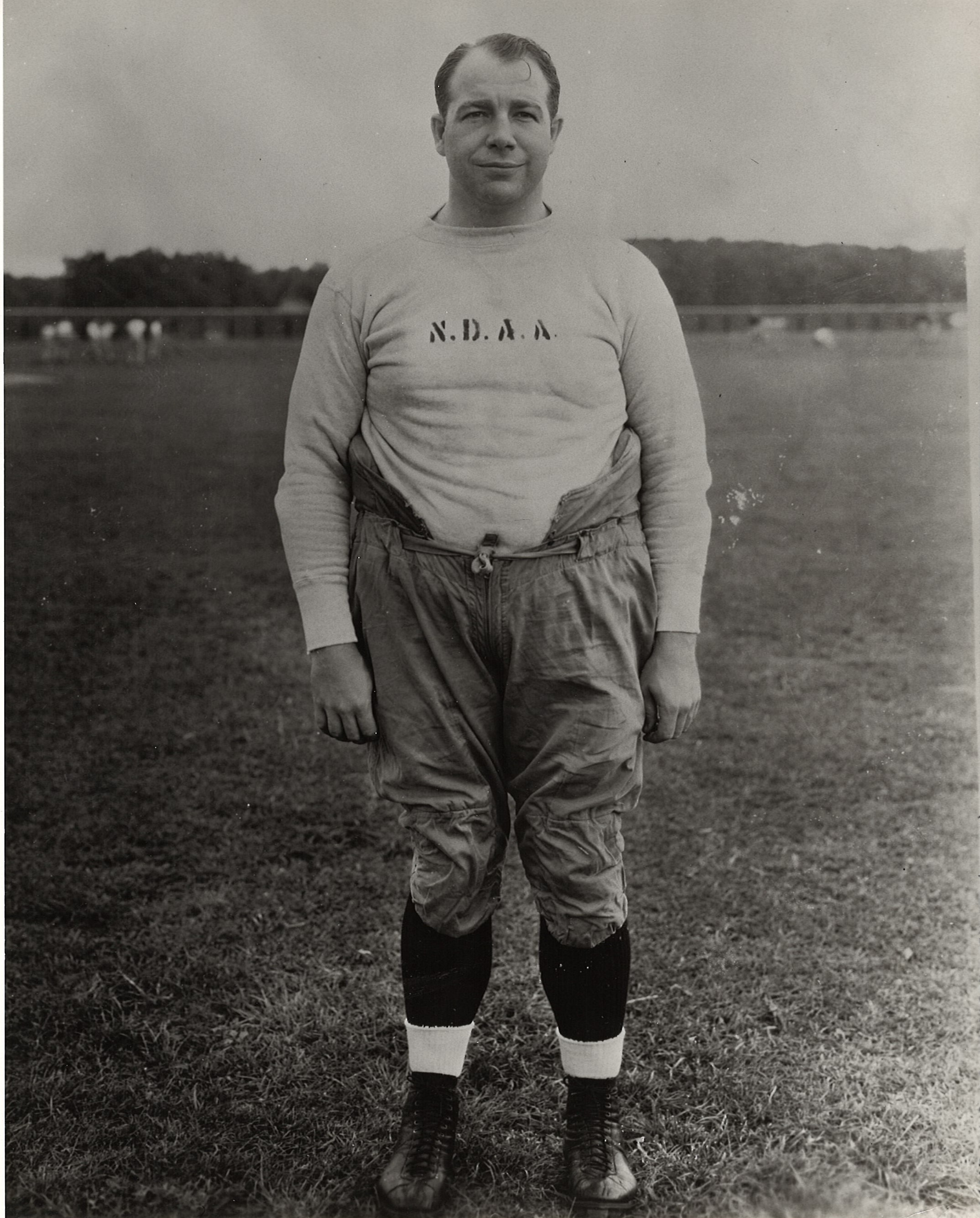
Joe Boland as a young line coach as Notre Dame in 1935

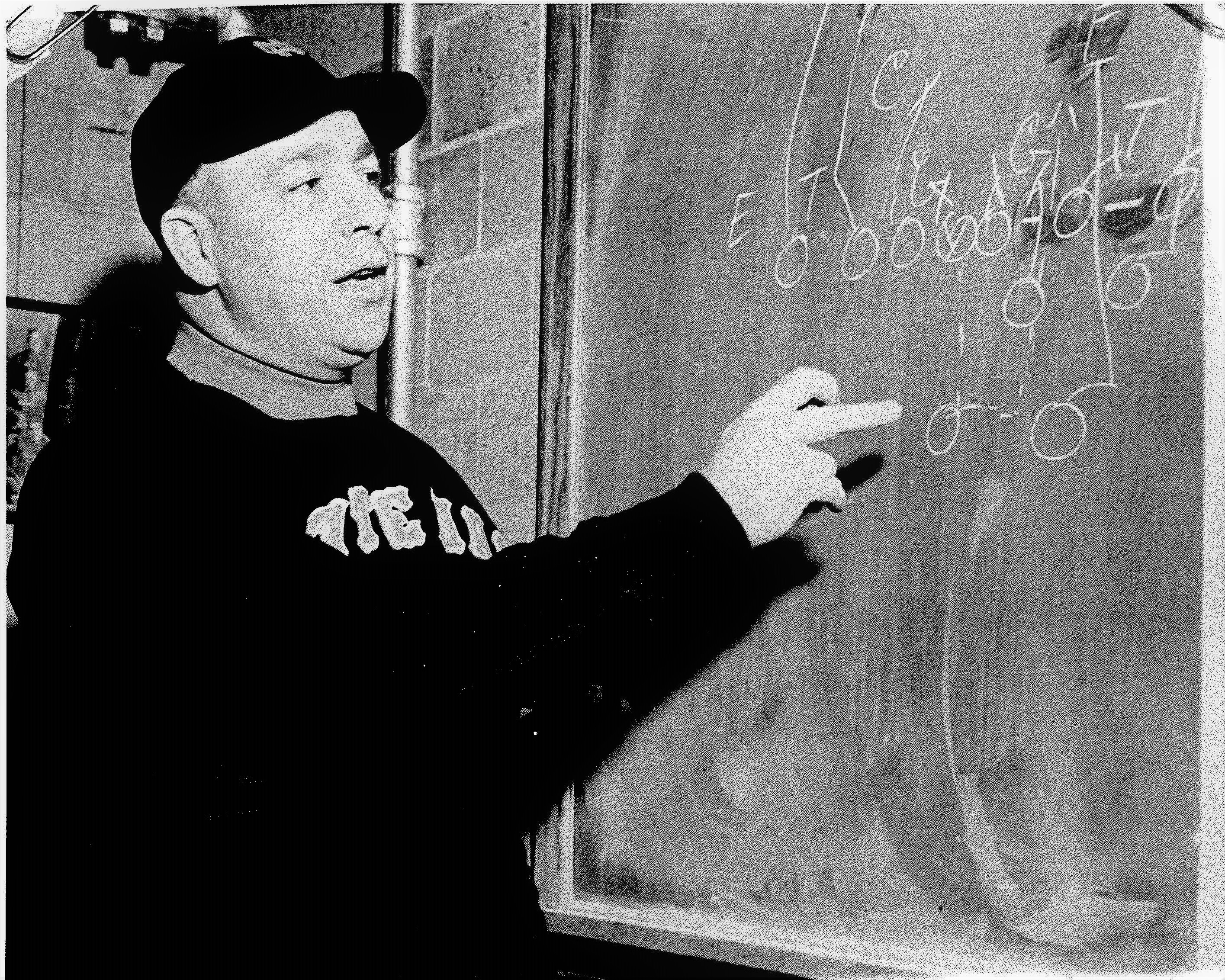
Joe Boland as line coach at Notre Dame

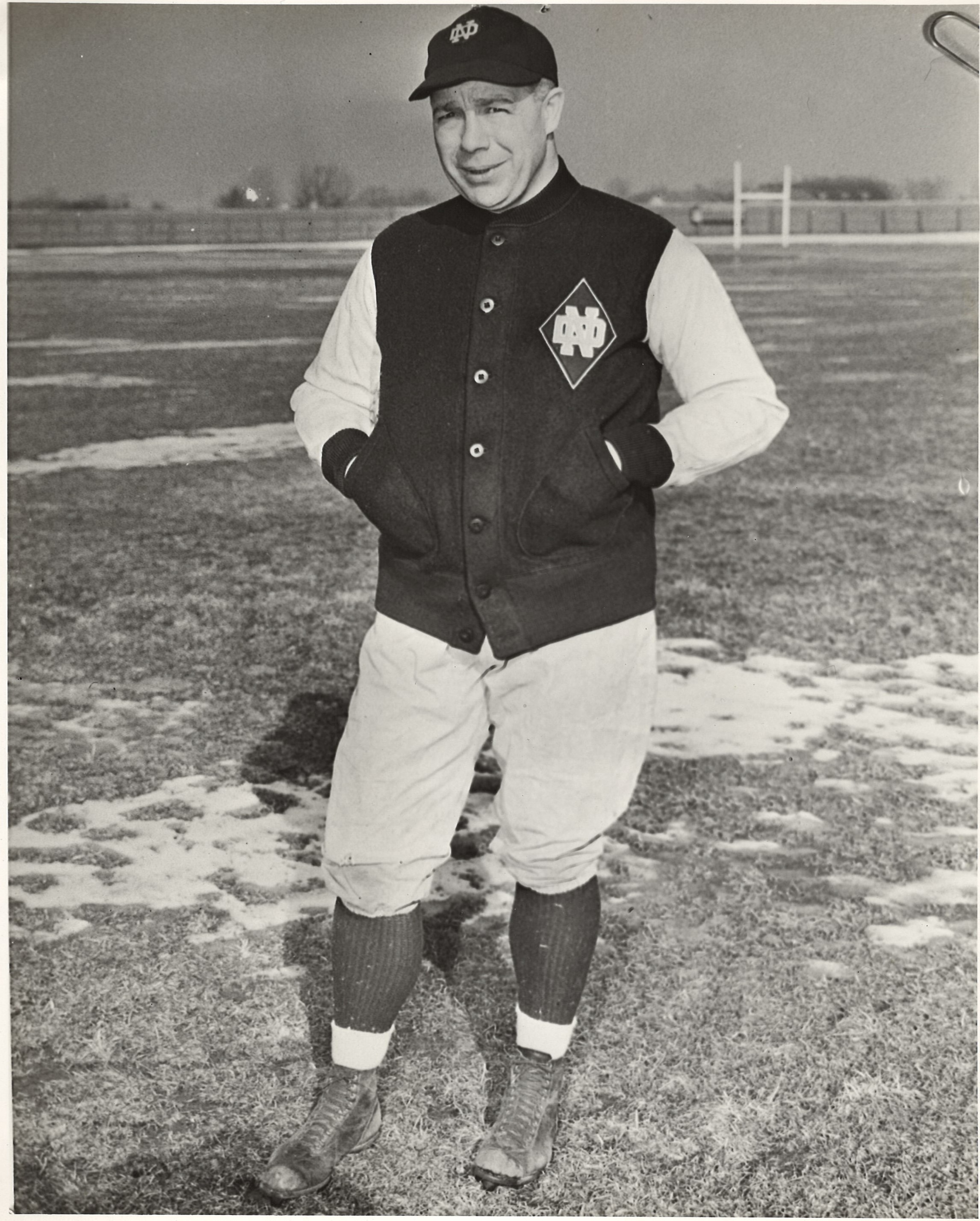
Joe Boland - Coaching Years at Notre Dame

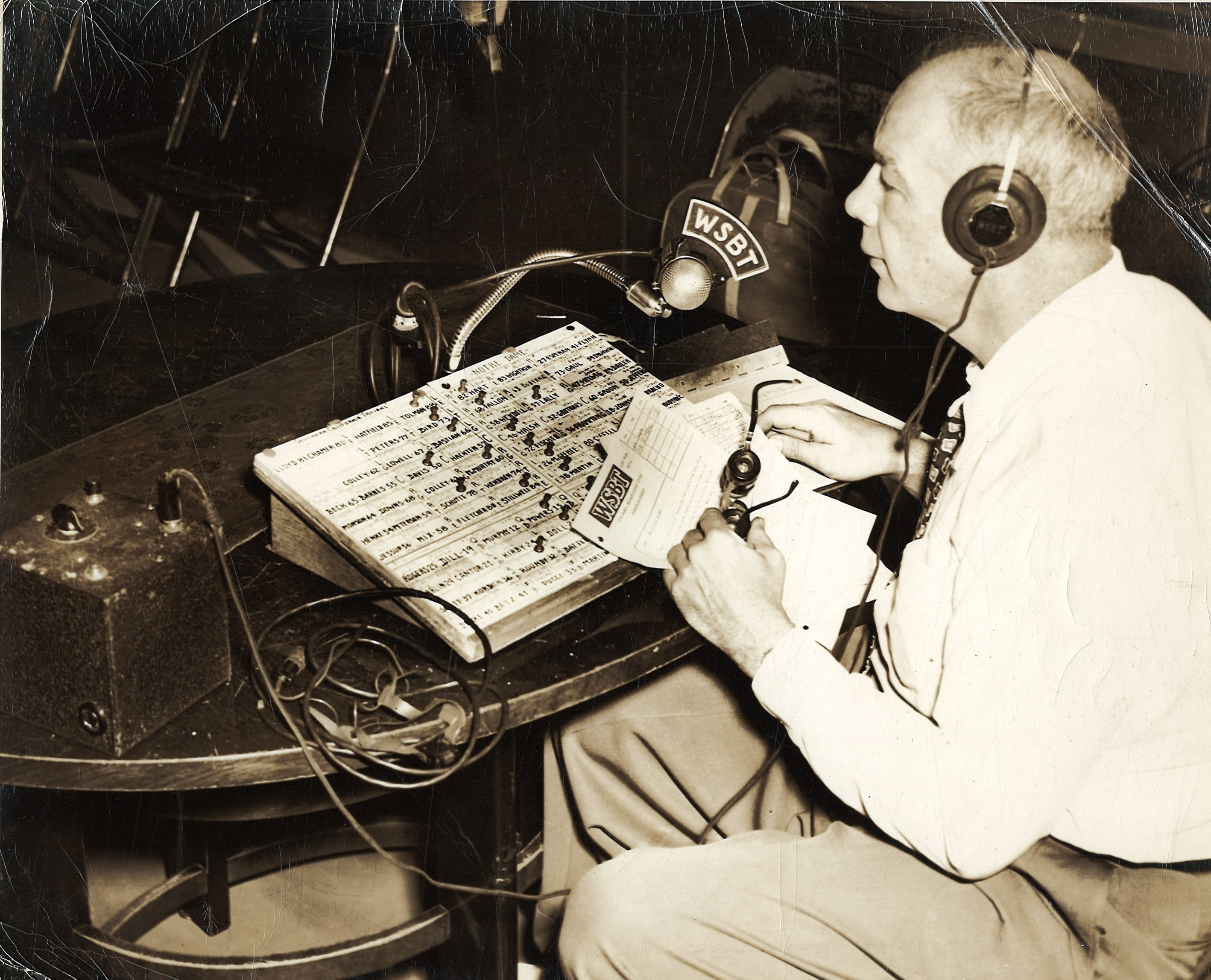
Joe Boland calling a football game for Notre Dame on WSBT radio

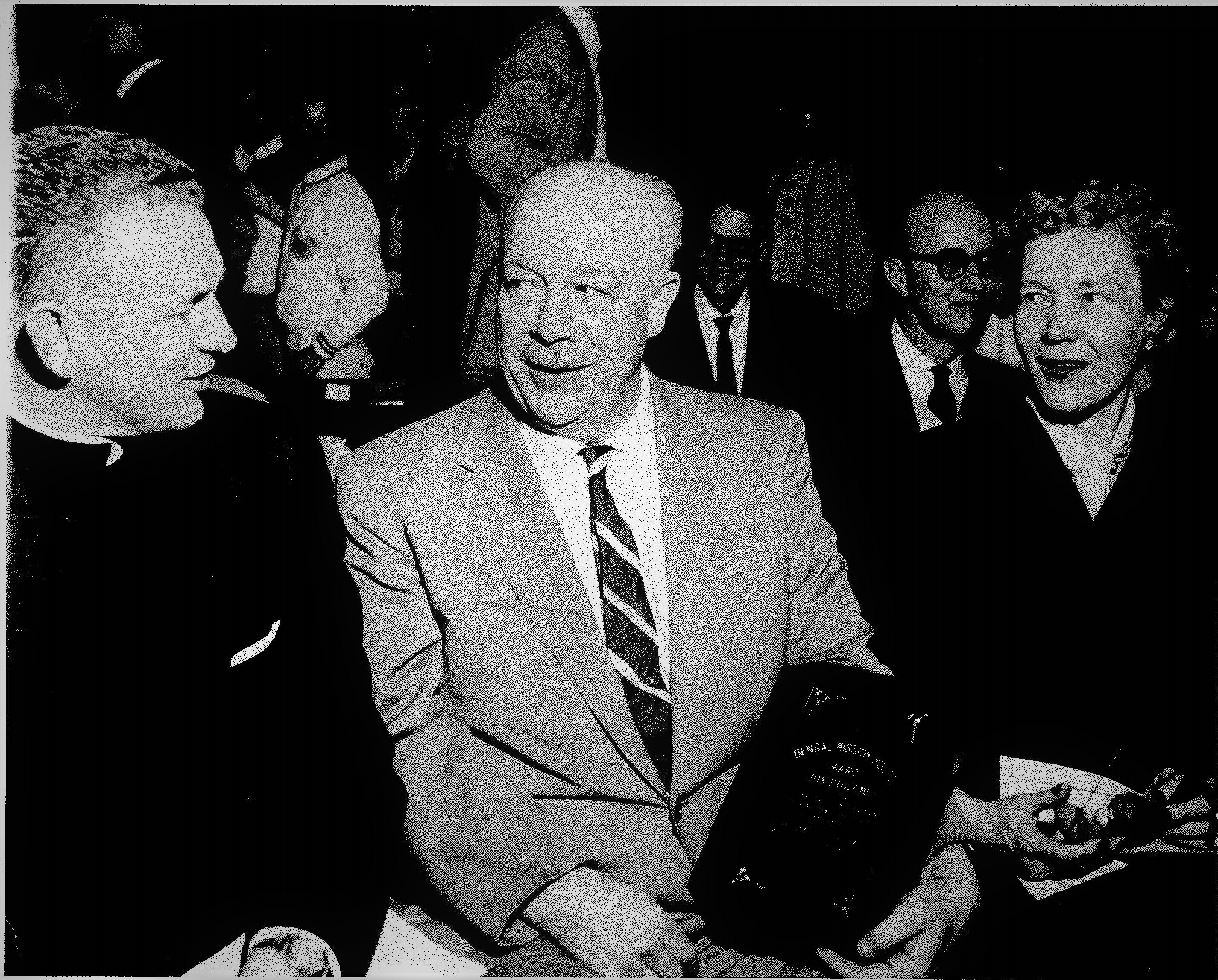
Joe Boland and his wife Peg Boland with Fr. Edmund Joyce of Notre Dame

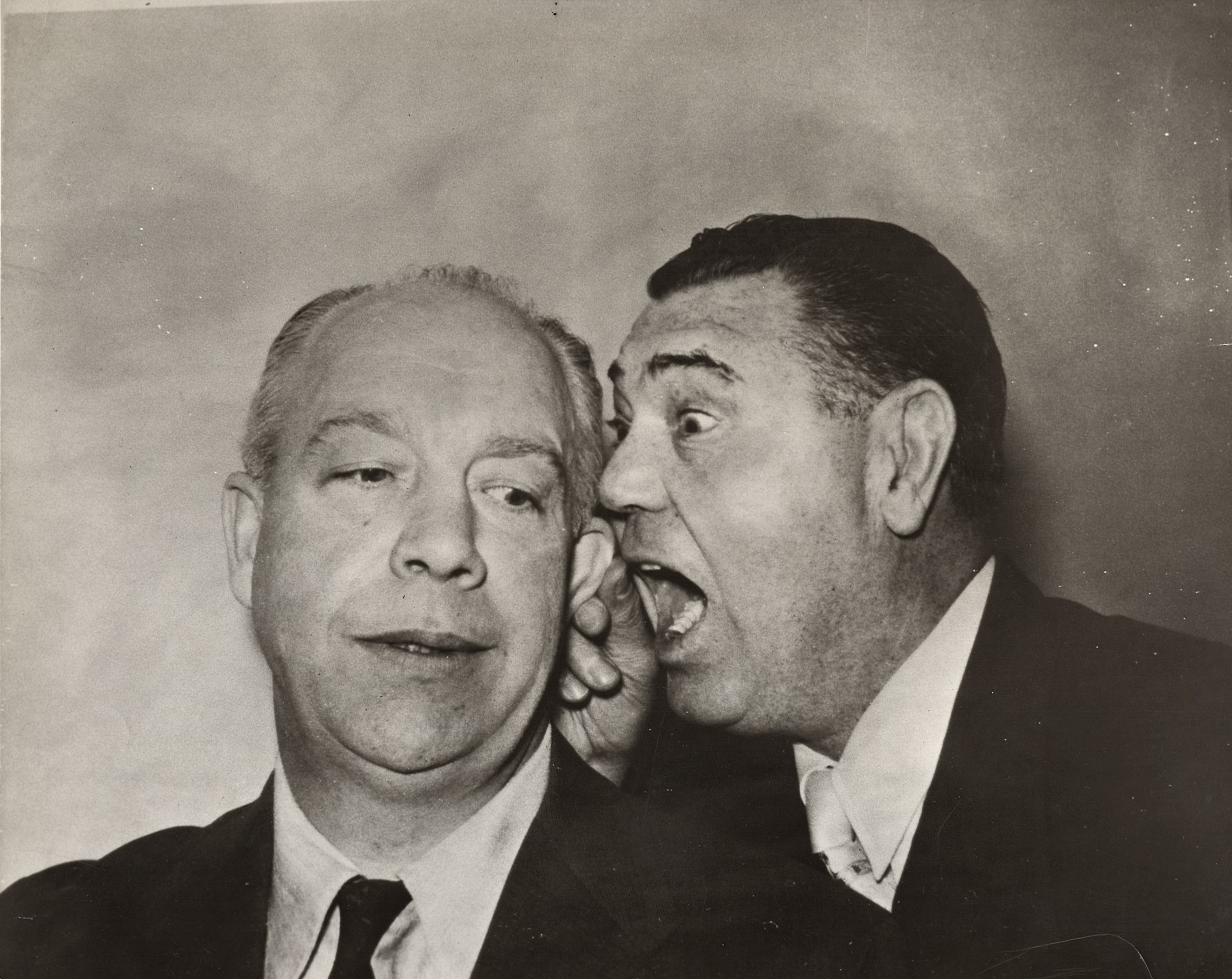
Joe Boland and Jack Dempsey at WSBT studio in South Bend, Indiana
