= Regis Philbin =

American television personality (1931–2020)

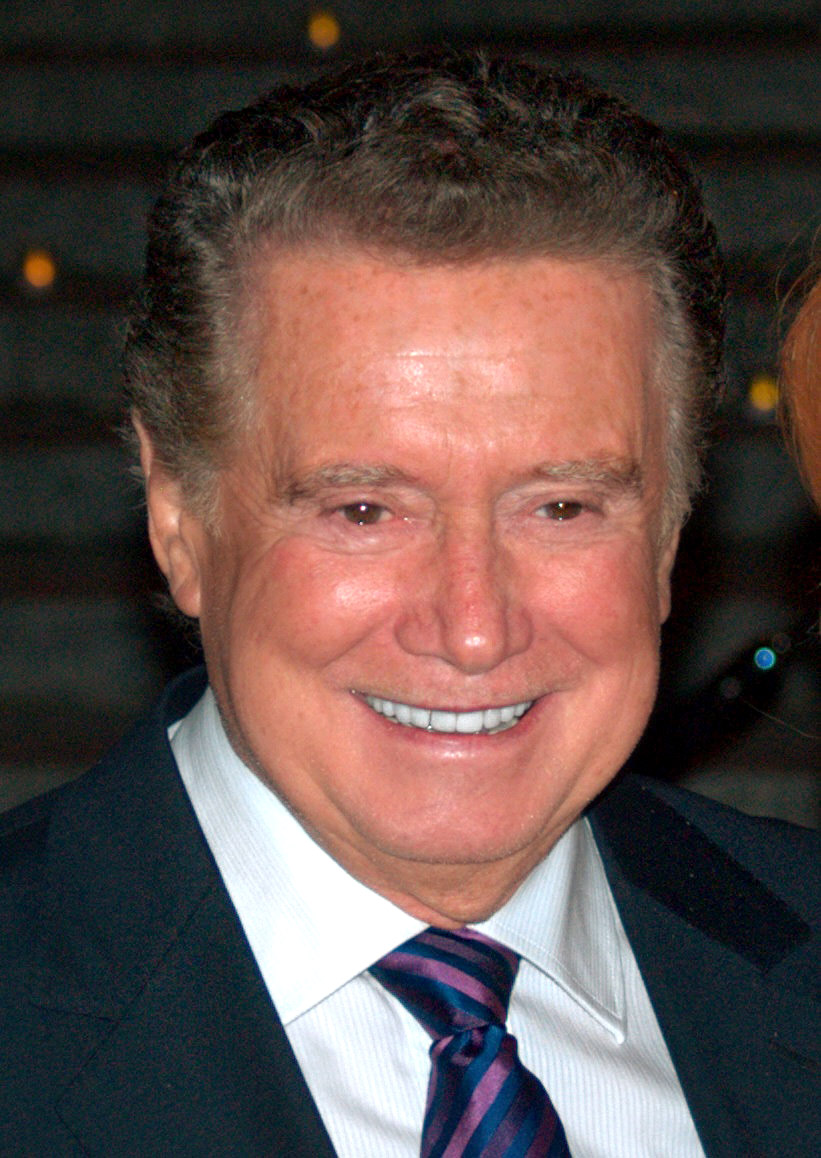
- Philbin in 2009
- Born: Regis Francis Xavier Philbin; August 25, 1931; New York City, U.S.
- Died: July 24, 2020 (aged 88); Greenwich, Connecticut, U.S.
- Burial place: Cedar Grove Cemetery
- Education: University of Notre Dame (BA)
- Occupations: Television presenter; talk show host; game show host; actor; singer
- Years active: 1955–2020
- Notable credits: Live with Regis and Kathie Lee (1988–2000); Who Wants to Be a Millionaire (1999–2002); Live! with Regis and Kelly (2001–2011)
- Spouses: Catherine Faylen (m. 1955; div. 1968) Joy Senese (m. 1970)
- Children: 4, including J.J.

Regis Francis Xavier Philbin (/ˈriːdʒɪs ˈfɪlbɪn/ REE-jis; August 25, 1931 – July 24, 2020) was an American television presenter, comedian, actor, and singer. Once called "the hardest-working man in show business", he continues to hold the Guinness World Record for the most hours spent on US television (posthumously).

Philbin was born and raised in New York City. After graduating from the University of Notre Dame, he served in the US Navy and got his television start serving as a page for The Tonight Show in the 1950s. Philbin got his first network television exposure in 1967 as Joey Bishop's sidekick on The Joey Bishop Show. He is most widely known as the co-host of the New York City–based nationally syndicated talk show Live! with Regis and Kathie Lee, starting in 1988, which became Live! with Regis and Kelly in 2001, and continued as Live! with Kelly after Philbin's departure in 2011. He is also well known as the original host of the American version of Who Wants to Be a Millionaire, the most-watched prime-time series of the 1999–2000 US television season.

Philbin also hosted Million Dollar Password and the first season of America's Got Talent.

== Early life ==
Regis Francis Xavier Philbin was born on August 25, 1931, in the Manhattan borough of New York City. His father, Francis "Frank" Philbin, was a US Marine of Irish descent who served in the Pacific, and his mother, Filomena ("Florence"; née Boscia), was a member of an Albanian-Italian immigrant family from Greci. Philbin had a Catholic upbringing. He was supposedly named "Regis" because his father wanted him to attend his alma mater, the prestigious Regis High School. It was long believed that he was an only child, but he announced on Live with Regis and Kelly in February 2007 that he had a brother named Frank (March 1, 1951 – January 27, 2007), who had died from non-Hodgkin lymphoma several days earlier. Philbin said his brother had asked not to be mentioned on television or in the press while still alive to protect his privacy.

Philbin was raised in the Van Nest neighborhood of the Bronx. He attended Our Lady of Solace grammar school and Cardinal Hayes High School. After graduating from high school, he attended the University of Notre Dame, where he lived in Fisher Hall, and graduated in 1953 with a degree in sociology. He later served in the US Navy as a supply officer Lieutenant Junior Grade and then went through a few behind-the-scenes jobs in television and radio before moving into broadcasting.

== Career ==
=== Early work ===
In his earliest show business work, Philbin was a page at The Tonight Show in 1955. Later he wrote for Los Angeles–based talk-show host Tom Duggan and nervously filled in one night when the hard-drinking Duggan failed to arrive. Philbin soon got a job at KCOP as assistant news editor to Baxter Ward, and when the station's sportscaster did not arrive one day, Philbin filled in. In 1957, Regis left his job in Los Angeles and returned to New York City.

His first talk show was The Regis Philbin Show in 1961 on KOGO-TV (now KGTV) in San Diego. after serving as news anchor for the station. For budget reasons, he had no writing staff, so he began each show with what became his hallmark, the "host chat" segment influenced by Jack Paar, where he engaged his audience (and later his co-host) in discussions about his life and the day's events. In 1964, Westinghouse Broadcasting picked up Philbin's talk show for national syndication in the late night time slot (replacing Steve Allen). That Regis Philbin Show failed to attract many stations and Westinghouse replaced Philbin with Merv Griffin in 1965.

=== Talk shows ===
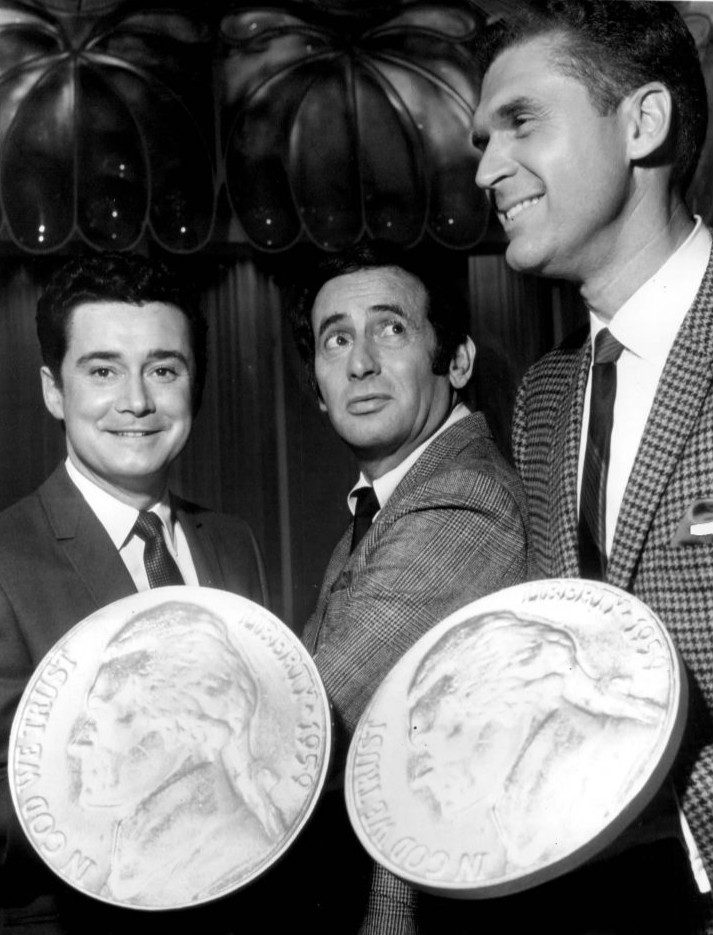
Philbin (left) with Joey Bishop and Johnny Mann on The Joey Bishop Show in 1969

In 1964, Philbin hosted That Regis Philbin Show, a nationally syndicated show for Westinghouse Broadcasting replacing The Steve Allen Show after Steve Allen returned to New York to replace Garry Moore as host of CBS-TV's I've Got a Secret. The audience did not accept Philbin as a replacement for Allen's zany antics and the appearance lasted slightly more than four months because of dismal ratings, especially compared to Johnny Carson in the same time slot. Nevertheless, Philbin has cited Carson as an influence.

Philbin gained his first network TV exposure in 1967 as Joey Bishop's sidekick on The Joey Bishop Show on television (1967–1969). In a Johnny Carson-Ed McMahon vein, Bishop would playfully tease Philbin and he would take the barbs in stride. But his feelings were hurt when he learned from the network grapevine that ABC executives were dissatisfied with his work and his thick accent, so during the opening of one 1968 program, he launched an unplanned diatribe about "not being wanted and letting down" the program and abruptly quit on air. A few nights later, assured by Bishop that all was well and the barbs were not personal, Philbin returned. As revealed in his 1995 book, I'm Only One Man!, this was actually a publicity stunt planned by Bishop and Philbin beforehand. He reiterates this assertion in his 2011 memoir, How I Got This Way, explaining that it was intended to draw in some of Johnny Carson's viewers. When The Joey Bishop Show was canceled, Bishop returned the favor and walked off the show on air unannounced, leaving Philbin to carry the night on his own. A 1978 book called The Great 1960s Quiz, authored by Dan Carlinsky (published by Harper & Row), asked: "Who was Regis Philbin?" (p. 7) The answer was "Joey Bishop's sidekick on his late night show." (p. 124)

During the early 1970s, Philbin co-hosted Tempo on Los Angeles station KHJ-TV (now KCAL-TV). He also commuted on weekends to St. Louis, where he filmed Regis Philbin's Saturday Night in St. Louis on KMOX-TV (now KMOV).

From 1975 to 1981, he co-hosted A.M. Los Angeles, a local morning talk show on KABC-TV, where Philbin was already working reviewing movies for newscasts on the station. He co-hosted first with Sarah Purcell (1975 to 1978), then with Cyndy Garvey (1978 to 1981). Philbin's presence brought the show from the bottom of the local ratings to No. 1.

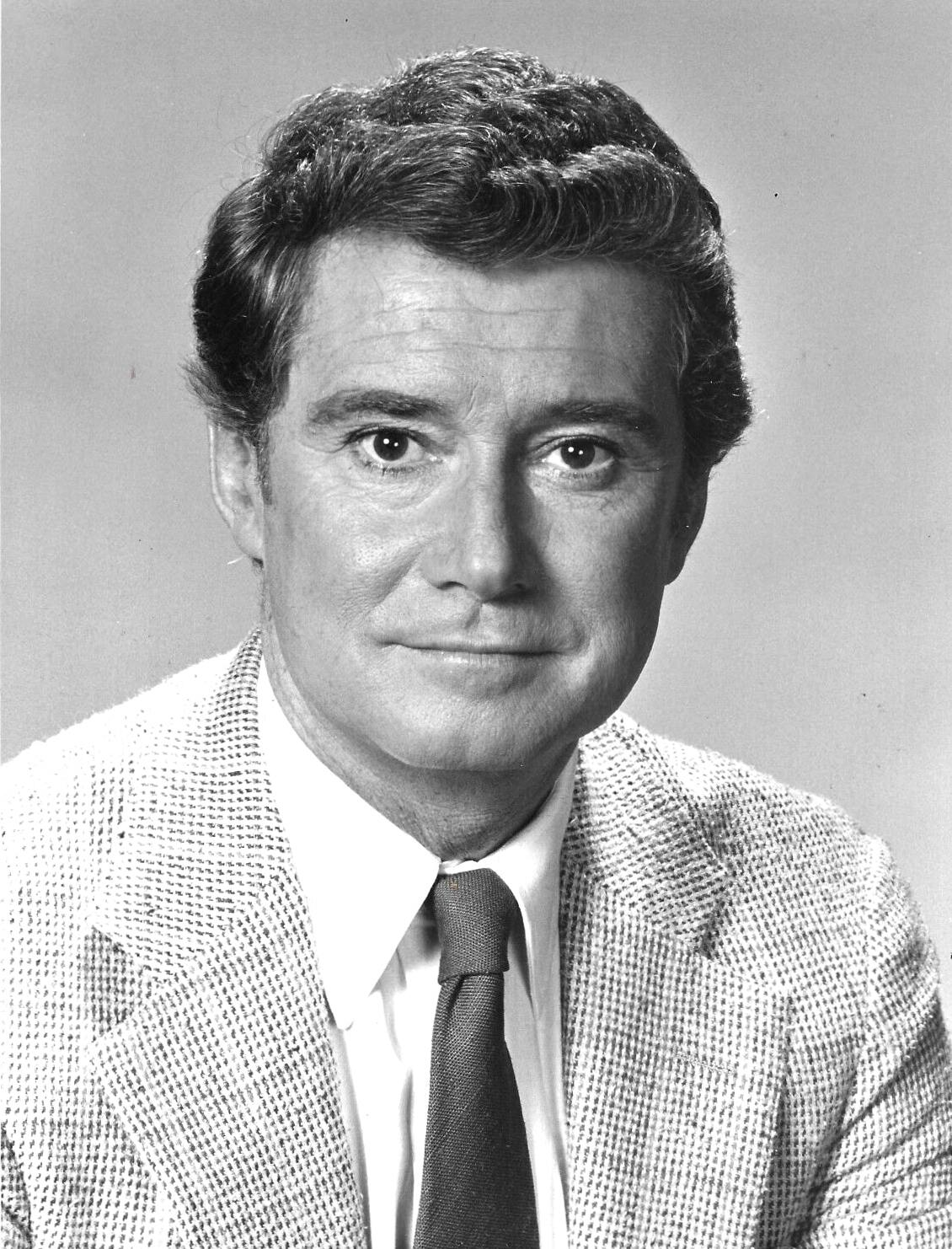
Philbin in 1982

From November 30, 1981, to April 9, 1982, Philbin and Mary Hart co-hosted "The Regis Philbin Show," a national morning variety series for NBC. Philbin was hoping to transfer his success from KABC to a national network show, but the show was not successful and lasted only 18 weeks. From 1982 to 1988, Philbin hosted the shows Health Styles and Lifestyles with Regis Philbin on the Cable Health Network and its successor, the Lifetime television network.

After Garvey left Los Angeles in 1982 and moved to New York City, Philbin rejoined her on The Morning Show, on WABC-TV starting on April 4, 1983. At the time, the 9 am time slot for WABC suffered from low Nielsen ratings because of competition from WNBC-TV's Donahue and WCBS-TV's game show block featuring The Joker's Wild and Tic Tac Dough. After Garvey left again and Ann Abernathy briefly shared co-hosting duties, Philbin was paired with Kathie Lee Johnson (later Gifford), in June 1985, and ratings improved significantly. The show became nationally syndicated on September 5, 1988, as Live! with Regis and Kathie Lee and the success continued. The program replaced A.M. Los Angeles upon its cancellation in 1991 and was eventually picked up by all of the ABC owned-and-operated stations except for WLS in Chicago, which aired The Oprah Winfrey Show in that time slot and had done so since the show's debut as A.M. Chicago.

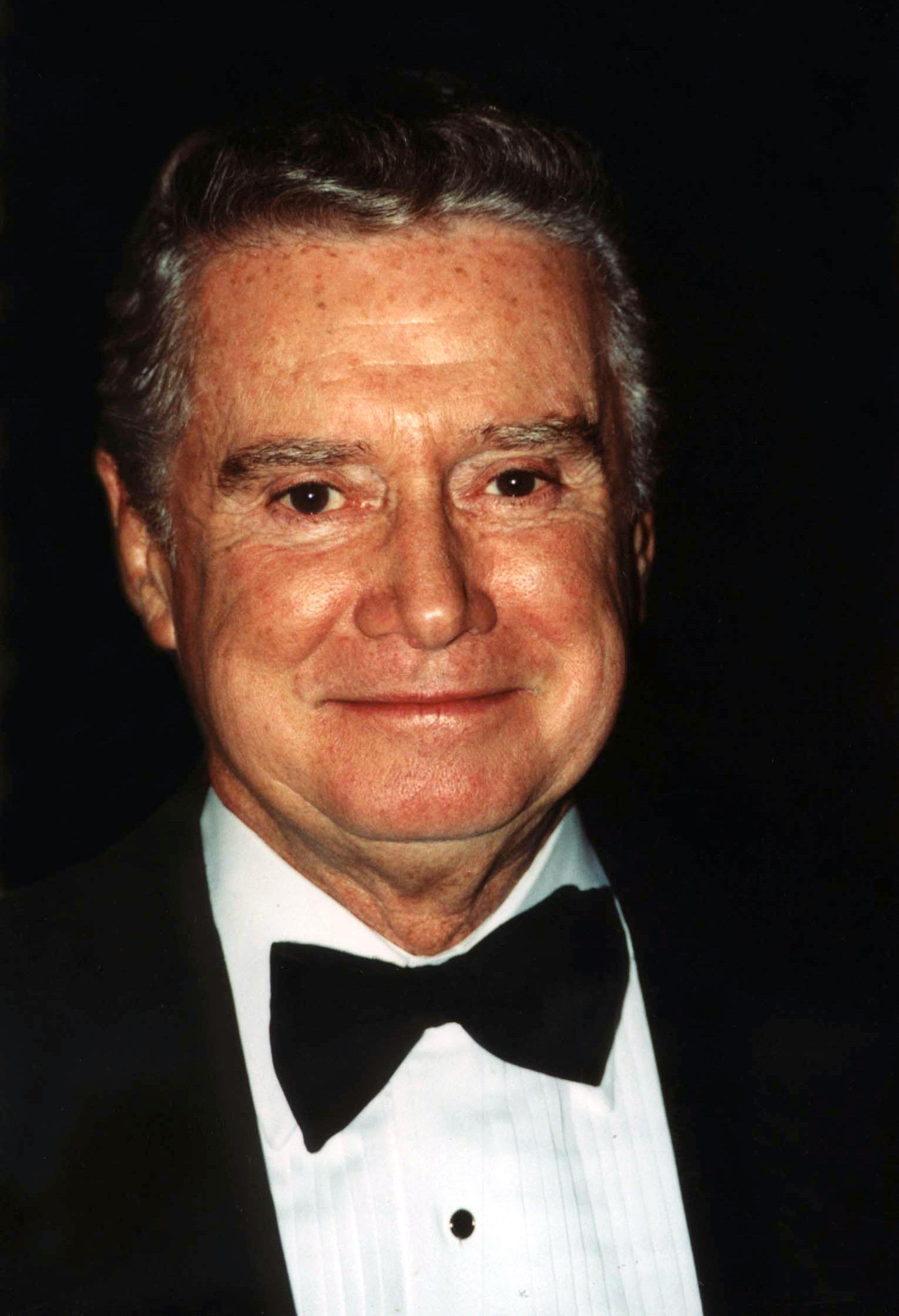
Philbin in Washington, D.C., in 2000

When Gifford departed in 2000, the show was temporarily named Live! with Regis. Philbin had guest co-hosts until a replacement was found. Philbin won a Daytime Emmy Award for Outstanding Talk Show Host in 2001. Kelly Ripa was chosen as the permanent co-host in February 2001, and the show was renamed Live! with Regis and Kelly. Their chemistry proved to be successful as the show continued to enjoy high ratings. Later in the year, Philbin and Ripa's show went to air several minutes after the first plane hit the north tower of the World Trade Center (1973–2001) during the September 11 terrorist attacks, with the two reacting in real time after the second plane crashed into the south tower and its subsequent collapse.

Philbin set a Guinness World Record for "Most Hours on Camera" on his August 20, 2004, Live show (surpassing Hugh Downs), which gave him a total of 15,188 hours on television.

In 2008, Philbin's contract with ABC was renewed through 2011. Under this contract, Philbin reportedly earned more than US $21 million per annum. He received a similar contract with CBS for hosting Million Dollar Password.

Philbin departed Live with Regis and Kelly after hosting his final show on November 18, 2011.

=== Game shows ===
Philbin was also a game show host. He hosted The Neighbors, a short-lived game show on ABC from late 1975 to early 1976. The show had two female contestants guessing which of her three women neighbors said gossipy things about her. In 1976, he was a "field reporter" for ABC's Almost Anything Goes, an American adaptation of the British game show, It's a Knockout.

Philbin was the original host of the US version of Who Wants to Be a Millionaire, an ABC game show that originated from the United Kingdom. Millionaire was a big ratings success in its 1999 debut, when it was intended as an occasional special series. ABC aired Millionaire as a regular series with frequent episodes, but its viewership slowly declined. After Millionaire was canceled, it was retooled in 2002 as a syndicated series hosted by Meredith Vieira. ABC brought back Millionaire in February 2004 with Philbin, retitled Who Wants to Be a Super Millionaire, a related series that was aired on a more limited basis.

In August 2009, Philbin hosted 11 episodes of a special edition of Who Wants to Be a Millionaire, celebrating the tenth anniversary of the show. He also was a celebrity contestant in this version on the final episode of the special. From 2007 to 2012, Millionaire (in its syndicated format) used guest hosts for selected weeks while Meredith Vieira was on assignment for the Today Show, and Philbin guest-hosted a week of episodes that aired in November and December 2009, coinciding with his December 2009 surgery.

Philbin's Millionaire hosting duties won him a Daytime Emmy Award for Outstanding Game Show Host in 2001. In a 2007 Time article, he was listed among the 15 Best Game Show Hosts in History. When Millionaire was honored on GSN's Gameshow Hall of Fame special, Philbin's tenure as the show's host was praised. Leigh Hampton, then executive producer of the syndicated version, said that he "[knew] when to take rein of it and when to sit back and let the contestant be the contestant," and Jennifer Slater of twogirlsandatv.com called him "the sweetest man on television." Philbin himself recalled his own Millionaire tenure on said special with the following statement:

You could only have a minute or two with it before the questions began. I did everything I could to make them more available for the right answer.

In November 2005, ABC announced that Philbin would host the network's revival of This Is Your Life. In August 2006, he reported that his option on the contract for the show had lapsed and he declined to renew it.

Philbin hosted the first season of America's Got Talent, a Simon Cowell–produced amateur talent search show on NBC, during the summer of 2006. He flew between New York City and Los Angeles during that time period to participate in both Live with Regis and Kelly and AGT. Because of his difficulty with commuting cross country and his health problems, he was replaced in 2007 by talk show host Jerry Springer. With regard to filling Philbin's spot, Springer noted that "no one fills in for Regis. He's the best there ever was at this so you pay homage to him."

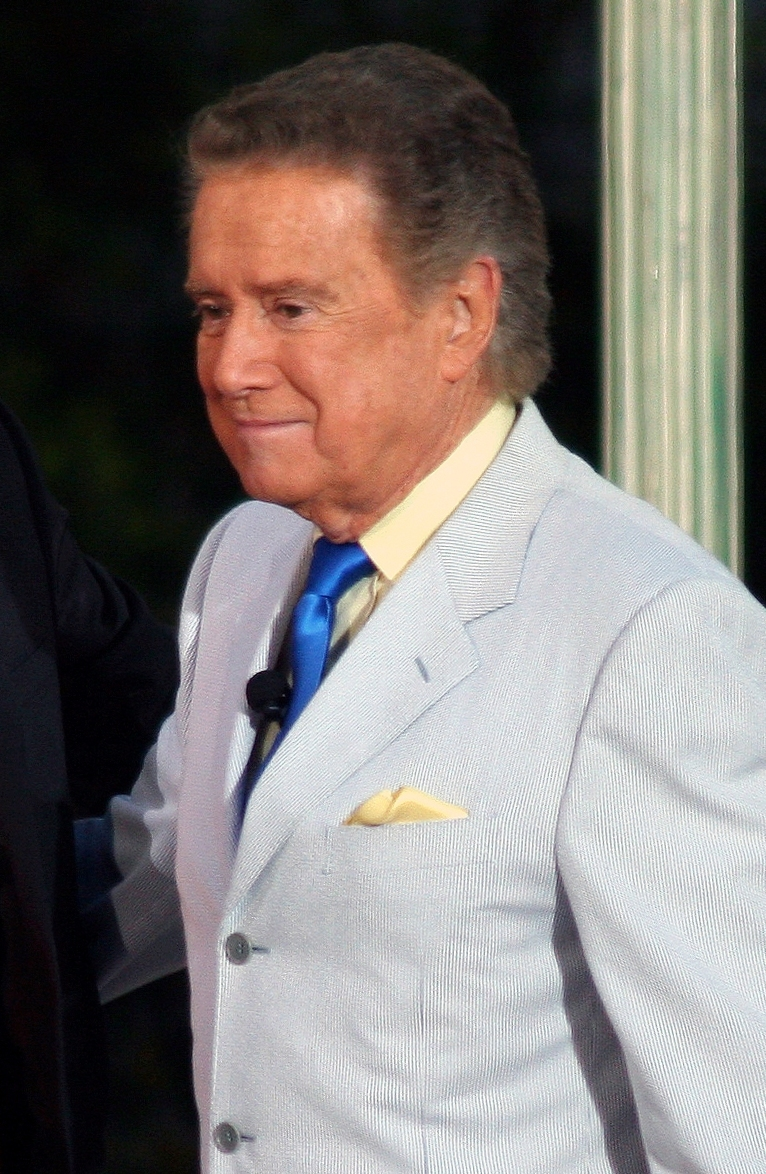
Philbin in 2009

Philbin's affiliation with Fremantle started to develop at this time. He hosted a revival of the Password franchise entitled Million Dollar Password, which premiered on June 1, 2008, and ended on June 14, 2009.

=== Other television ===
On December 31, 2004, Philbin filled in for Dick Clark on ABC's Dick Clark's New Year's Rockin' Eve, as Clark was recovering from a stroke. Philbin (who was a year and a half younger than Clark) lightheartedly claimed to have interrupted his previously planned vacation to do the show. The following year, Philbin hosted a competing special for Fox, replacing Clark's new co-host and eventual successor Ryan Seacrest.

Philbin was also the host of The Apprentice 2 finale on December 16, 2004, and the official 30-minute red carpet arrivals at the 80th Academy Awards ceremony on February 24, 2008.

Philbin hosted the 37th Daytime Emmy Awards on June 27, 2010.

=== Guest appearances ===
Philbin made regular guest appearances on Late Show with David Letterman. He was often introduced by Letterman as "Regis Lee Philbin", a play on his former morning co-host, Kathie Lee Gifford. He also appeared on other late-night talk shows; such as Jimmy Kimmel Live!, Late Night with Conan O'Brien, The Late Late Show with Craig Ferguson, and Late Night with Jimmy Fallon.

Philbin appeared on the sitcoms Spin City, How I Met Your Mother, Mad About You, Hope & Faith, Seinfeld, and The Fresh Prince of Bel-Air, as well as the sketch-comedy programs The Dana Carvey Show, Mad TV, and The Larry Sanders Show. He appeared in an episode of The Big Valley called "The Challenge" which first aired on March 18, 1968. In 1970, he appeared in an episode of the ABC crime drama The Silent Force, and also in an episode of the series That Girl.

In 1991, Philbin was a celebrity guest at WrestleMania VII in Los Angeles, commenting on the main event between Hulk Hogan and Sgt. Slaughter.

In 1998, Philbin made an appearance in Disney's Hercules as the voice of the mythical monster Typhon; Kathie Lee Gifford was also present as the voice of Typhon's mate, Echidna.

On December 25, 2000, Philbin appeared as a panelist on the first season championship game of the ESPN game show 2 Minute Drill.

On February 28, 2004, Philbin guest-starred in the Lilo & Stitch: The Series episode "Drowsy".

On May 15, 2006, Philbin appeared as a special guest, alongside Howie Mandel, for a two-hour special episode of Deal or No Deal on NBC.

Philbin appeared three times on Celebrity Jeopardy!, the most appearances for any competing celebrity on the game show Jeopardy!. In November 2006, he won his competition and earned $50,000 for Cardinal Hayes High School, his alma mater.

Philbin appeared as a contestant on Celebrity Are You Smarter Than a 5th Grader? in November 2007. He again played for his alma mater, Cardinal Hayes High School. He dropped out of the game and went home with $175,000 for the school.

In September 2008, Philbin guest starred as himself on How I Met Your Mother, where he joined the cast in the search for New York's best hamburger. The show revealed that he worked out at Barney's gym. During the best-burger hunt, his picture hung in the "Best Burger" restaurant and every other suspected best-burger restaurant, such as Corner Bistro and Veggie Heaven. In the show, he hosted a "show within a show" called Million Dollar Heads or Tails, which made reference to both Million Dollar Password and Millionaire.

On December 25, 2009, Philbin attended Christmas Mass with Father Edward L. Beck and Timothy Dolan, the current Archbishop of New York, at The Sunday Mass and gave a special interview discussing how being a Catholic had influenced his life.

In February 2011, Philbin made an appearance on Take Two with Phineas and Ferb. On July 3, 2011, he was a celebrity guest on The Marriage Ref, along with Tracy Morgan and Susie Essman.

He appeared as himself in a 2020 episode of the ABC sitcom Single Parents, which was created by his daughter, J. J. Philbin.

=== After Live! ===
On May 29, 2012, Philbin appeared on CNN's Piers Morgan Tonight during the show's Guest Host Week. Philbin's guest was his long-time friend, fellow television host David Letterman.

From September 2012 to October 2017, Philbin was an official recurring monthly co-host on Rachael Ray.

On Fox Sports 1, Philbin began co-hosting Crowd Goes Wild, a daily sports panel show, on August 17, 2013. He once again partnered with his producer from Millionaire, Michael Davies. In February 2014, he announced his leaving. He returned to occasionally host from March until its cancellation on May 8.

Philbin guest-hosted two episodes of The Late Late Show in January 2015. That July, he appeared on Today with Kathie Lee and Hoda. He reappeared on the program roughly once a month, and sometimes joined Gifford as a guest host on Hoda Kotb's days off.

== Writing and singing ==
Philbin's two autobiographies (with co-author Bill Zehme), I'm Only One Man! (1995) and Who Wants To Be Me? (2000), are written in the conversational or anecdotal style of his host chats. The first follows a year (1994–1995) in his life, his memories of celebrities, and work on Live with Regis and Kathie Lee, among other things. The next was a response to the success of Who Wants to Be a Millionaire. In 2011, upon leaving Live!, HarperCollins released his final memoir, How I Got This Way.

Philbin was a crooner in the styles of his favorite singers: Dean Martin, Perry Como, and Frank Sinatra. He tested the musical waters with his 1968 pop vocal release, It's Time for Regis! After receiving poor reviews, he was reluctant to record another studio album, but he occasionally sang on Live, usually duets. In 2004, he recorded When You're Smiling, a traditional pop album.

The Regis Philbin Christmas Album was released in September 2005 by Hollywood Records. It features several duets, with friend Donald Trump ("Rudolph the Red-Nosed Reindeer"), Steve Tyrell ("Marshmallow World"), and wife Joy ("Baby, It's Cold Outside" and "Winter Wonderland"). A special edition was produced, including tracks sung with the Notre Dame Glee Club.

== Personal life ==
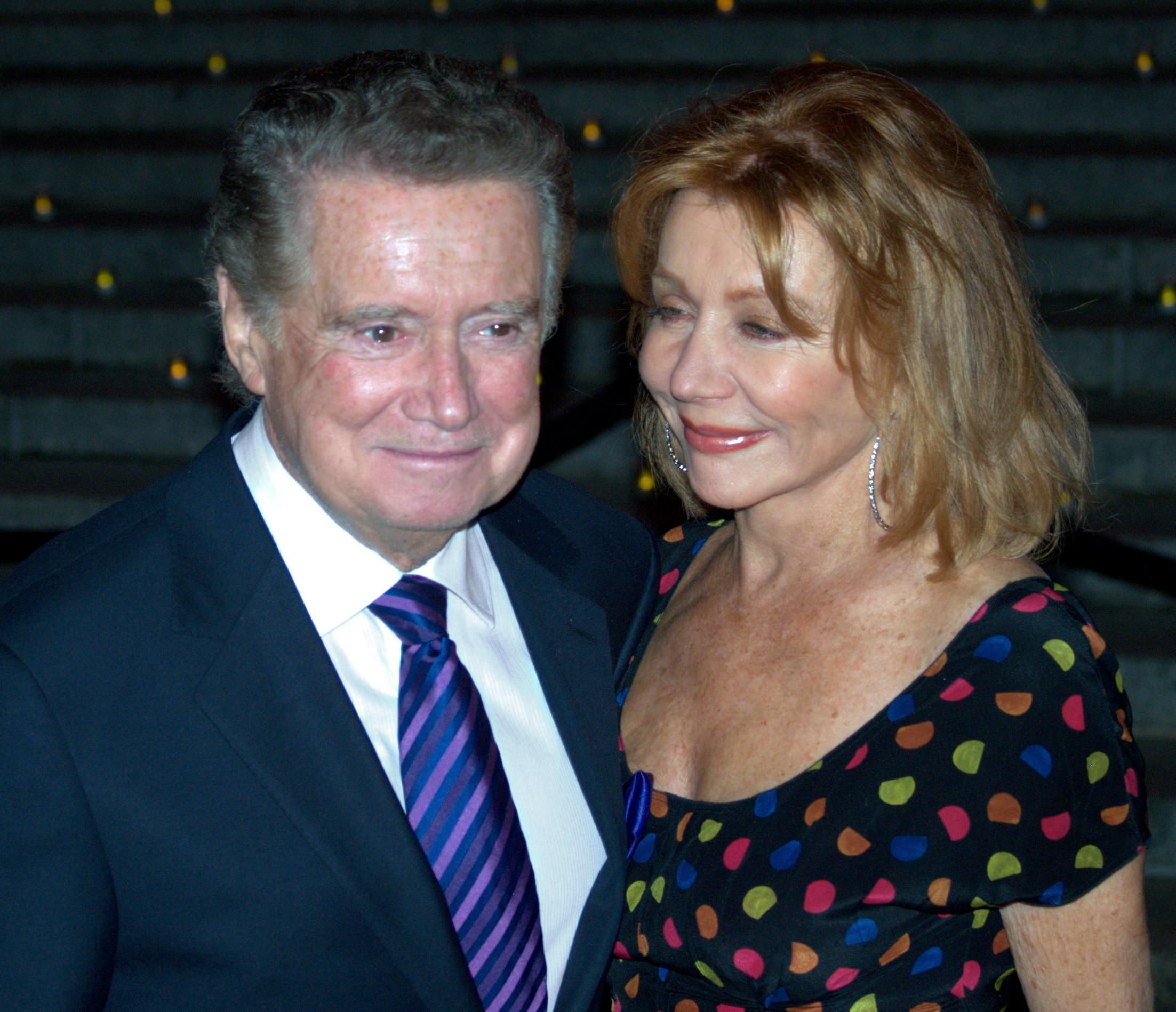
Philbin and his wife Joy in New York City, 2009

Philbin was married to Catherine Faylen, the daughter of actor Frank Faylen, from 1955 to 1968; they had a daughter named Amy (born 1961) and a son named Daniel before divorcing. He married interior decorator Joy Senese in 1970. Prior to their meeting, she had worked as an assistant for Joey Bishop. They had two daughters: Joanna (born 1973) and J.J. (born 1974). Joy occasionally co-hosted with Philbin. He split his time between his Manhattan apartment (near the WABC-TV studios) and his house in Greenwich, Connecticut. Joy also appeared on episodes of Hope & Faith, and as herself in Miss Congeniality 2: Armed and Fabulous.

Philbin followed sports extensively, especially baseball and football. He was an avid fan of the New York Yankees and a proud supporter of the Notre Dame Fighting Irish, the sports teams of his alma mater. He narrated the two audio CDs that accompanied Joe Garner's book Echoes of Notre Dame Football: Great and Memorable Moments of the Fighting Irish, and he was unwilling to waver even when St. John's basketball coach Steve Lavin asked Regis to trade his allegiance.

After graduating from Notre Dame in 1953, he returned to campus often for football games, concerts, pep rallies, banquets, and other events, and donated $2.75 million to the university to build the Philbin Studio Theatre for performance arts productions. When he heard that Larry King had never visited Notre Dame Stadium, he invited King and insisted on giving him a tour of the "greatest college campus in the world", which he did in October 2002 with Tim Russert also in attendance.

Philbin played on the Notre Dame tennis team, casting doubt on claims he made in an ad that he had learned to play tennis from Joy. Notre Dame football coaches such as Charlie Weis, Tyrone Willingham, and Lou Holtz have appeared on Live. Along with being a Yankees fan, Philbin was also "keeping an eye on the Florida Marlins". On May 5, 2009, he delivered the first pitch at a Marlins game. He also supported the Pittsburgh Pirates in his final years.

In March 1984, Philbin opened a Ford dealership in Gilbert, Arizona, as a side investment during his career in television. The dealership, Philbin Ford, suffered due to the already-saturated auto market in the area, and it was closed in late 1988.

=== Health and death ===
Philbin had an angioplasty in 1993. On March 14, 2007, he underwent triple bypass surgery at Weill Cornell Medical Center because of plaque in his arteries. Before the surgery, Philbin talked with David Letterman, for whom he had substituted on Late Show with David Letterman during Letterman's own quintuple bypass surgery. After Philbin's successful heart surgery, he returned to the show on April 26. On December 1, 2009, Philbin had hip replacement surgery. He returned to his regular hosting duties on January 4, 2010. In May 2010, he underwent surgery to have a blood clot removed from his calf, and returned to work the next day.

Philbin died from heart disease due to coronary artery disease at a hospital in Greenwich, Connecticut, on July 24, 2020, at the age of 88. His funeral was held at the Basilica of the Sacred Heart and he is buried in Cedar Grove Cemetery, both on the campus of his alma mater, the University of Notre Dame.

In October 2020, three months after his death, Millionaire host Jimmy Kimmel closed an episode with a tribute to Philbin. He said Philbin had been a devoted friend and “was exactly the same off the air as he was on it. He was so much fun, so full of energy, and truly one of the great television personalities.” Additionally, Kimmel said he and the producers of the show made donations to several charities Regis had supported over the years, in the name of Regis and Joy.

== Popular culture ==
=== Acting roles ===
Philbin was cast as car salesman Handsome Hal on Kelly Ripa's sitcom Hope & Faith. He was chosen as the voice of Mabel, the sister of the Ugly Stepsister (played by Larry King), in Shrek the Third. His final film was Jack and Jill, in which he played himself as an extra for a Pepto Bismol commercial.

=== Who Wants to Be a Millionaire ===
During the successful first run of Who Wants to Be a Millionaire, Philbin popularized the monochromatic look in men's formal wear that emphasizes color rather than pattern in ties and dress shirts. His look was a suit, shirt and tie coordinated in solid, slightly varying shades of the same, usually dark or muted, color. A Van Heusen clothing line based on this look, called Regis, was short-lived.

When Philbin hosted Who Wants to Be a Millionaire, he used the phrase "Is that your final answer?" whenever he had to confirm a contestant's answer. Adopted from the original UK host Chris Tarrant, this became Philbin's catch phrase during his tenure with the show.

In August 2009, Philbin returned to host a two-week miniseries of new Millionaire episodes celebrating the American primetime show's 10th anniversary. The eleven shows (Sunday-to-Thursday twice, plus one extra Sunday) started airing on August 9 on ABC primetime.

Philbin (along with Steve Harvey and John Henson) were named the 2009–10 guest hosts of the daily Millionaire. Philbin's episodes aired November 30 – December 4, 2009, and debuted new rules on the show.

=== 2007 Neiman Marcus Christmas Book ===
In October 2007, Philbin was featured in the 100th anniversary issue of the Neiman Marcus Christmas Book. He was a host of the Classical Superstars Fantasy Concert, which included piano virtuoso Lola Astanova with Russia's Kirov Orchestra led by conductor Valery Gergiev. The super concert for 500 guests was offered for sale at $1.6 million.

== Awards and honors ==
In Van Nest, Bronx, Cruger Avenue between Sagamore Street and Bronxdale Avenue was co-named Regis Philbin Avenue.

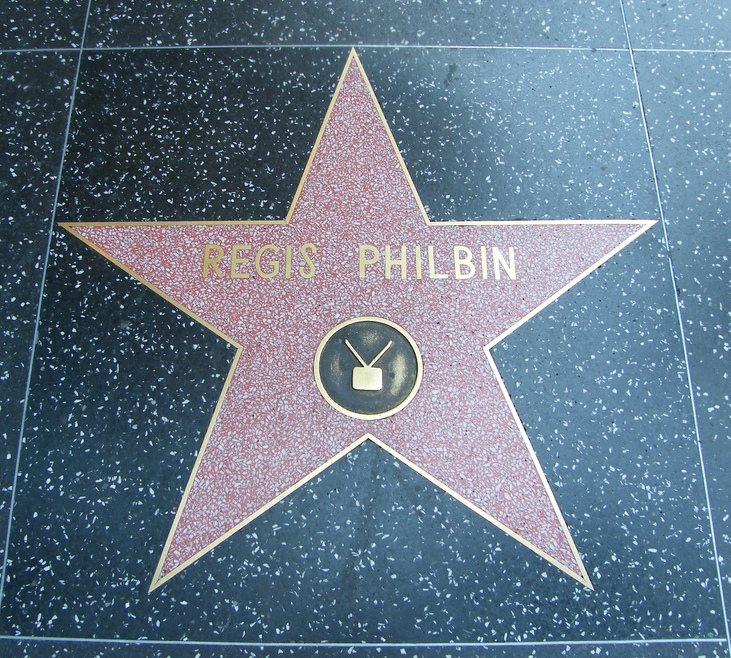
Philbin's star at the Hollywood Walk of Fame

- 1997: Bronx Walk of Fame
- May 2001: winner, Daytime Emmy Award for Outstanding Game Show Host, Who Wants to Be a Millionaire
- May 2001: winner, Daytime Emmy Award for Outstanding Talk Show Host, Live with Regis (tie with Rosie O'Donnell)
- February 2001: winner, TV Guide Award Personality of the Year
- January 1, 2002: grand marshal of Tournament of Roses Parade
- February 2003: winner, Walter Camp Distinguished American Award
- April 10, 2003: receives star on Hollywood Walk of Fame
- August 20, 2004: sets Guinness World Record for "Most Hours on Camera" – 15,188 hours
- July 2005: winner, PR.com "Best Celebrity Nickname"
- April 2006: inducted into the National Association of Broadcasters Hall of Fame
- April 2006: inducted into Television Hall of Fame
- September 2008: Guinness World Record updated to 16,100 hours
- June 2008: Lifetime Achievement Award from the Daytime Emmy Awards
- 2009: Guinness World Record updated to 16,540.5 hours
- 2010: Golden Mike's Broadcast Legend Award, Radio and Television News Association of Southern California
- 2011: winner, Daytime Emmy Award for Outstanding Talk Show Host, Live with Regis and Kelly (tie with Dr. Oz)
- August 19, 2011: recipient of the Disney Legends award, for his contributions in Television.
- September 15, 2011: Guinness World Record updated to 16,746.5 hours
- November 18, 2011: Philbin received a key to the City of New York from Mayor Michael Bloomberg to honor his 28-year contribution to New York media.
- May 9, 2015: honorary Doctor of Humane Letters degree from Trine University

== Legacy ==
The Regis Philbin Studio Theatre in the Marie P. DeBartolo Performing Arts Center was named after him. It is a 2,333-square-foot (216.7 m^{2}) black box theater with configurable seating and staging and a system of five catwalks.

== Discography ==
Studio albums

Year	Album details	Peak positions
Year	Album details	US
1968	It's Time for Regis!: Released: 1968; Label: Mercury Records	—
2004	When You're Smiling: Released: September 28, 2004; Label: Hollywood Records	54
2009	Just You. Just Me.: Released: November 24, 2009; Label: Big Dot Records	9
"—" denotes releases that did not chart

Holiday albums

Year	Album details	Peak positions		
Year	Album details	US	US Holiday	UK
2005	The Regis Philbin Christmas Album: Released: September 27, 2005; Label: Hollywood Records	74	9	163

Singles

Year	Single	Album
2005	"Rudolph the Red-Nosed Reindeer" (with Donald Trump)	The Regis Philbin Christmas Album
2005	"Frosty the Snowman"	The Regis Philbin Christmas Album

== Books ==
- Philbin, Regis; Gifford, Kathie L.; Albright, Barbara (1993). Cooking with Regis & Kathie Lee. New York: Hyperion. ISBN 978-1-56282-752-6.
- Philbin, Regis; Gifford, Kathie L.; Albright, Barbara (1994). Entertaining with Regis & Kathie Lee: Year-round Holiday Recipes, Entertaining Tips, and Party Ideas. New York: Hyperion. ISBN 978-0-7868-6067-8.
- Philbin, Regis; Zehme, Bill (1995). I'm Only One Man!. New York: Hyperion. ISBN 978-0-7868-8911-2.
- Philbin, Regis (1997). "Foreword". In Faust, Gerry; Love, Steve (eds.). Gerry Faust: The Golden Dream. Champaign, Illinois: Sagamore Pub. ISBN 978-1-57167-118-9.
- Philbin, Regis; Zehme, Bill (2000). Who Wants to Be Me?. New York: Hyperion. ISBN 978-0-7868-6739-4.
- Philbin, Regis (2005). "Foreword". In Langford, Jim; Langford, Jeremy (eds.). The Spirit of Notre Dame: Legends, Traditions, and Inspiration from One of America's Most Beloved Universities. New York: Doubleday. ISBN 978-0-8245-2542-2.
- Philbin, Regis (2009). "Foreword". In Lurie, Dan; Robson, David (eds.). Heart of Steel: The Dan Lurie Story. Bloomington, Indiana: AuthorHouse. ISBN 978-1-4343-8545-1.
- Philbin, Regis (2011). How I Got This Way. It Books. ISBN 978-0-06-210975-0.
