= Larry L. Greenfield =

Larry L. Greenfield is a Baptist writer, educator, theologian, minister, non-profit executive and interfaith activist. He is the former executive director of the Parliament of the World's Religions and was the executive minister of American Baptist Churches USA. Greenfield is a former dean of students at the University of Chicago and also served as the president of the Colgate Rochester Crozer Divinity School.

== Awards ==
Greenfield was awarded the University of Chicago Divinity School Alumni of the Year award in 1990. He received his Ph.D. from the school.
