= Walter Rauschenbusch =

American theologian and Baptist pastor (1861-1918)

The Reverend Walter Rauschenbusch
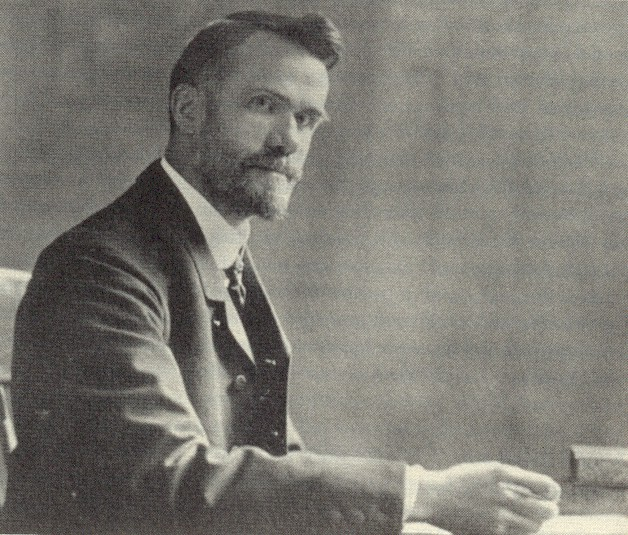
- Born: October 4, 1861; Rochester, New York, U.S.
- Died: July 25, 1918 (aged 56); Rochester, New York, U.S.
- Spouse: Pauline Rother Rauschenbusch (m. 1893)
- Parents: Augustus Rauschenbusch; Caroline Rump

Ecclesiastical career
- Religion: Christianity (Baptist)
- Ordained: 1886

Academic background
- Education: University of Rochester; Rochester Theological Seminary
- Influences: W. D. P. Bliss; Horace Bushnell; Richard T. Ely; Henry George; Washington Gladden; Adolf von Harnack; Johann Gottfried Herder; Immanuel Kant; Gottfried Wilhelm Leibniz; Albrecht Ritschl; Frederick William Robertson; Friedrich Schleiermacher; Josiah Strong; Johannes Weiss

Academic work
- Discipline: Theology; history
- School or tradition: Christian socialism; Social Gospel
- Institutions: Rochester Theological Seminary
- Notable works: A Theology for the Social Gospel (1917)
- Influenced: Frederic M. Hudson; Martin Luther King Jr.; Lucy Randolph Mason; James McClendon; Reinhold Niebuhr; Richard Rorty; Norman Thomas; Desmond Tutu

Walter Rauschenbusch (Note: Pronounced /ˈwɔːltər ˈraʊʃənbʊʃ/.) (1861–1918) was an American theologian and Baptist pastor who taught at the Rochester Theological Seminary. Rauschenbusch was a key figure in the Social Gospel and single tax movements that flourished in the United States during the late 19th and early 20th centuries. He was also the maternal grandfather of the influential philosopher Richard Rorty and the great-grandfather of Paul Raushenbush.

== Biography ==
=== Early life and education ===
Walter Rauschenbusch was born October 4, 1861, in Rochester, New York, to Germans Augustus Rauschenbusch and the former Caroline Rump.

Though he went through a youthful rebellious period, at age 17 he experienced a personal religious conversion which "influenced [his] soul down to its depths." Like the Prodigal Son, he wrote, "I came to my Father, and I began to pray for help and got it." But he later felt that this experience was incomplete, focused on repentance from personal sins but not from social sins.

After high school, he went to study in a gymnasium (equivalent to a preparatory school) in Gütersloh in Germany. Thereafter, he returned to the United States and studied at the University of Rochester where he obtained a Bachelor of Arts in 1884. Then, he studied theology at the Rochester Theological Seminary of the American Baptist Churches USA and obtained a Bachelor of Divinity in 1886.

When he attended Rochester Theological Seminary, his early teachings were challenged. He learned of higher criticism, which led him to comment later that his "inherited ideas about the inerrancy of the Bible became untenable." He also began to doubt the substitutionary atonement; in his words, "it was not taught by Jesus; it makes salvation dependent upon a trinitarian transaction that is remote from human experience; and it implies a concept of divine justice that is repugnant to human sensitivity." But rather than shaking his faith, these challenges reinforced it.

=== Ministry ===
In 1886, Rauschenbusch began his pastorate in the Second German Baptist Church in "Hell's Kitchen", New York. Urban poverty and funerals for children led him to social activism. For him, the Church had an essential role in the fight against systemic injustices among all groups and for each person.

In 1892, Rauschenbusch and some friends formed a group called the Brotherhood of the Kingdom. Pastors and leaders joined the organization to debate and implement the social gospel.

In 1897, he began teaching the New Testament at Rochester Theological Seminary in Rochester, New York, until 1902, where he taught Church history.

In 1907, he published the book Christianity and the Social Crisis which would influence the actions of several actors of the social gospel.

In 1917, the publication of the book A Theology for the Social Gospel will rally at the cause of the social gospel many liberal Protestant churches. In this book, he explains that Christians must be like the Almighty who became man in Jesus Christ, who was with everyone equally and considered people as a subject of love and service.

=== Death and legacy ===
Walter Rauschenbusch died in Rochester on July 25, 1918, at the age of 56.

Rauschenbusch's work influenced, among others, Martin Luther King Jr., Desmond Tutu, Lucy Randolph Mason, Reinhold Niebuhr, Norman Thomas, George McGovern, James McClendon, and his grandson, Richard Rorty. Even in the 21st century Rauschenbusch's name is used by certain social-justice ministries in tribute to his life and work, including such groups as the Rauschenbusch Metro Ministries in New York and the Rauschenbusch Center for Spirit and Action in Seattle.

The North American Baptist Conference Archives in Sioux Falls, South Dakota, and the American Baptist Historical Society in Atlanta, Georgia, both maintain extensive Rauschenbusch collections. The Archives of the Orchard Community Church in Greece, New York, contain the original baptismal records of Walter and membership records for his wife and father.

A stained-glass window was given to the Andrews Street Baptist Church (known as the First German Baptist Church until 1918) in Rochester around 1929 by Mrs. Edmund Lyon. The building was vacant during the late 1960s and some of the windows were stolen, including part of the original Rauschenbusch window. A new congregation purchased the building and a stained-glass expert repaired and re-created some of the windows; however, the upper portion of the Rauschenbusch window is substantially different from the original. A photograph of the original window appears in a booklet that was published for the centennial celebration of the church in 1951.

== View of Christianity ==
Rauschenbusch's view of Christianity was that its purpose was to spread the Kingdom of God, not through a "fire and brimstone" style of preaching, but by the Christlike lives led by its members. Rauschenbusch did not understand Jesus' death as an act of substitutionary atonement; rather, he came to believe that Jesus died "to substitute love for selfishness as the basis of human society." Rauschenbusch wrote that "Christianity is in its nature revolutionary" and tried to remind society of that. He taught that the Kingdom of God "is not a matter of getting individuals to heaven, but of transforming the life on earth into the harmony of heaven."

In Rauschenbusch's early adulthood, mainline Protestant churches were largely allied with the social and political establishment, in effect supporting such practices as the use of child labor and the domination of robber barons. Many church leaders did not see a connection between these issues and their own congregations, so did nothing to address the suffering. But Rauschenbusch saw it as his duty as a minister and student of Christ to act with love by trying to improve social conditions.

=== Social responsibility ===
In Christianity and the Social Crisis (1907), Rauschenbusch wrote, "Whoever uncouples the religious and the social life has not understood Jesus. Whoever sets any bounds for the reconstructive power of the religious life over the social relations and institutions of men, to that extent denies the faith of the Master." The significance of this work is that it spoke of the individual's responsibility toward society.

In his Theology for the Social Gospel (1917), he wrote that for John the Baptist, the baptism was "not a ritual act of individual salvation but an act of dedication to a religious and social movement."

Concerning the social depth and breadth of Christ's atoning work, Rauschenbusch wrote: "Jesus did not in any real sense bear the sin of some ancient Briton who beat up his wife in B. C. 56, or of some mountaineer in Tennessee who got drunk in A. D. 1917. But he did in a very real sense bear the weight of the public sins of organized society, and they in turn are causally connected with all private sins."

Rauschenbusch enumerated

six sins, all of a public nature, which combined to kill Jesus. He bore their crushing attack in his body and soul. He bore them, not by sympathy, but by direct experience. Insofar as the personal sins of men have contributed to the existence of these public sins, he came into collision with the totality of evil in mankind. It requires no legal fiction of imputation to explain that "he was wounded for our transgressions, he was bruised for our iniquities." Solidarity explains it.

These six "social sins" which Jesus, according to Rauschenbusch, bore on the cross:

Religious bigotry, the combination of graft and political power, the corruption of justice, the mob spirit [being "the social group gone mad"] and mob action, militarism, and class contempt – every student of history will recognize that these sum up constitutional forces in the Kingdom of Evil. Jesus bore these sins in no legal or artificial sense, but in their impact on his own body and soul. He had not contributed to them, as we have, and yet they were laid on him. They were not only the sins of Caiaphas, Pilate, or Judas, but the social sin of all mankind, to which all who ever lived have contributed, and under which all who ever lived have suffered.

Rauschenbusch also devoted considerable effort to explicating the problem of evil, which he saw embodied not in individuals, but in "suprapersonal entities", which were socio-economic and political institutions. He found four major loci of suprapersonal evil: militarism, individualism, capitalism, and nationalism. To these he juxtaposed four institutional embodiments of good: pacifism, collectivism, socialism, and internationalism.

=== A Theology for the Social Gospel ===
The social gospel movement was not a unified and well-focused movement, as it contained members who disagreed with the conclusions of others within the movement. Rauschenbusch stated that the movement needed "a theology to make it effective" and likewise "theology needs the social gospel to vitalize it." In A Theology for the Social Gospel (1917), Rauschenbusch took up the task of creating "a systematic theology large enough to match [our social gospel] and vital enough to back it." He believed that the social gospel would be "a permanent addition to our spiritual outlook and that its arrival constitute[d] a state in the development of the Christian religion", and thus a systematic tool for using it was necessary.

In A Theology for the Social Gospel, Rauschenbusch wrote that the individualistic gospel had made the sinfulness of the individual clear, but it had not shed light on institutionalized sinfulness: "It has not evoked faith in the will and power of God to redeem the permanent institutions of human society from their inherited guilt of oppression and extortion." This ideology would be inherited by liberation theologians and civil rights advocates and leaders such as Martin Luther King Jr.

The idea of the Kingdom of God is crucial to Rauschenbusch's proposed theology of the social gospel. He stated that the ideology and "doctrine of the Kingdom of God" of which Jesus Christ "always spoke" had been gradually replaced by that of the church. This was done at first by the early church out of what appeared to be necessity, but Rauschenbusch called Christians to return to the doctrine of the Kingdom of God. Of course, such a replacement has cost theology and Christians at large a great deal: the way we view Jesus and the synoptic gospels, the ethical principles of Jesus, and worship rituals have all been affected by this replacement. Rauschenbusch saw four practical advantages in emphasizing the Kingdom of God rather than the Church: The Kingdom of God is not subject to the pitfalls of the Church; it can test and correct the Church; it is a prophetic, future-focused ideology and a revolutionary, social and political force that understands all creation to be sacred; and it can help save the problematic, sinful social order.

== Works ==
- "Das Leben Jesu". Cleveland, 1895.
- Evangeliums-Lieder 1 & 2 (Gospel Hymns) mit Deutschen Kernliedern. Edited with Ira Sankey. Chicago: Bigelow and Main Co., 1904.
- Christianity and the Social Crisis. New York: Macmillan, 1907.
- For God and the People: Prayers of the Social Awakening. Boston: The Pilgrim Press, 1910.
- "Unto Me." Boston: The Pilgrim Press, 1912.
- Christianizing the Social Order. New York: Macmillan, 1912.
- "Some Moral Aspects of the 'Woman Movement,'" The Biblical World, vol. 42 (Oct. 1, 1913), pp. 195–199.
- Dare We Be Christians. Boston: The Pilgrim Press, 1914.
- A Theology for the Social Gospel. New York: Abingdon Press, 1917.
- The Social Principles of Jesus. New York: The Association Press, 1918.

=== Contributions ===
- Freedom and the Churches (chapter one: The Baptist Contribution), 1913
- The Path of Labor (chapter six: Justice and Brotherhood), 1918

== See also ==
- Charles Sheldon
