= Catherine LaCugna =

Catholic theologian (1952–1997)

Catherine Mowry LaCugna (August 6, 1952 – May 3, 1997) was a feminist Catholic theologian and author of God For Us. Her work on the Trinity sought to explore its relevance to the lives of modern Christians.

== Early life and education ==
Catherine LaCugna was born in Seattle, Washington on August 6, 1952, one of six children of Catherine Leahy Mowry and Charles Sebastian LaCugna; her father was a political science professor at what is now Seattle University. She attended Holy Names Academy and then in 1974 earned her bachelor's degree in philosophy at Seattle University and went on to earn her master's degree from Fordham University. Her doctorate in theology (1979) was also from Fordham.

== Career ==
LaCugna taught briefly at Fordham University (1976–80) and Vassar College (1981) and then joined the faculty at University of Notre Dame in 1981. There, she taught systematic theology to graduate and undergraduate students, eventually holding the Nancy Reeves Dreux Chair of Theology. In 1985-86, she served as a resident scholar at the Collegeville Institute, an ecumenical study center in the Benedictine tradition.

== Trinitarian theology ==
LaCugna, a Western theologian, sought common ground with Eastern Christians through re-examining early Christian scholars or Church Fathers. She rejected modern individualist notions of personhood and emphasised the self-communication of God.

Dennis Toohey contends that "LaCugna also approaches the doctrine of the Trinity from the economy of salvation." Building on the work of Karl Rahner, LaCugna argued that the "demise of the doctrine of the Trinity" started when early church theologians had to respond to the teachings of Arius, arch-heretic of the Christian Church. Arius' doctrine required a response, and the Church Fathers' response began the theological trek into speculation on the inner, hidden life of God, commonly referred to as the Immanent Trinity. Whereas before, theologians had concentrated on the nature of God as revealed in God's actions in history (commonly called the Economic Trinity).

According to LaCugna, the Church Father Augustine furthered this divide between economic and immanent Trinity with his psychological model of the Trinity, which described the inner life of God as being like a human's memory, intellect, and will. Thomas Aquinas's scholastic theology significantly expanded the scope of theological inquiry.

Against Rahner and Karl Barth (in Church Dogmatics I/1, §9), LaCugna wished to retain the use of the word persons in relation to the three persons of the Trinity (cf. God for us, p. 252). LaCugna saw Rahner's manners of subsisting and Barth's modes (or ways) of being as too easily adopting the modern notion of individualistic personhood, instead of a relational and interdependent model.

LaCugna says that God is known ontologically only through God's self-revelation in the economy of salvation, and that "[t]heories about what God is apart from God's self-communication in salvation history remain unverifiable and ultimately untheological." She says faithful Trinitarian theology must be practical and include an understanding of our own personhood in relationship with God and each other, which she calls "living God's life with one another". LaCugna wrote that “God is essentially relational” and argued that, through grace, humans are invited to participate in divine love.

LaCugna's doctrine of the Trinity has been challenged by theologians such as Nicholas Lash and James William McClendon, Jr.

== Awards ==
Professor LaCugna received two significant teaching awards from Notre Dame University. In 1993, she received the Frank O'Malley undergraduate teaching award, and she received the Charles E. Sheedy Teaching Award in 1996. Her 1991 book, God for Us: The Trinity and Christian Life, won a first place award from the Catholic Press Association.

== Death and Legacy ==
Catherine LaCugna taught at University of Notre Dame until her death from cancer. She finished her spring semester 1997 classes on April 29 and then died on May 3, 1997. She is buried at the university's Cedar Grove cemetery. Her grave marker includes a sentence from her book God for Us, "We were created for the purpose of glorifying God by living in right relationship as Jesus Christ did, by becoming holy through the power of the Spirit of God, by existing as persons in communion with God and every other creature."

In 2005, the Catholic Theological Society of America created the Catherine Mowry LaCugna Award. It is given annually "to new scholars for the best academic essay in the field of theology within the Roman Catholic tradition."

== Published works ==
- The Theological Methodology of Hans Kung ISBN 0891305467
- God for Us: The Trinity and Christian Life ISBN 0-06-064913-5
- Freeing Theology : The Essentials of Theology in Feminist Perspective ISBN 0-06-064935-6 (editor)
