= Gilbert B. Forbes =

American pediatrician

Gilbert Burnett Forbes (1915-2003) was an academic pediatrician who held appointments at Children's Hospital, St. Louis, MO; Southwest Medical School, Dallas, TX; and the University of Rochester Medical Center, Rochester, NY. He studied the measurement of body composition and pediatric nutrition.

== Education and career ==
Gilbert Burnett Forbes was born in Rochester, NY, to Gilbert de Leverance Forbes, MD, doctor for the town of Kendall, NY, and Lillian Burnett Forbes on November 9, 1915, the oldest of three children. He was the seventh generation of a branch of the Forbes family that emigrated from Scotland to NYC in the early 1700s. He graduated from Kendall Central School at age 16, spent a year at Genesee Wesleyan Seminary in Lima, NY, and matriculated at the University of Rochester in 1932, graduating in 1936. He graduated from the University of Rochester Medical School in 1940.

He married Grace Ann Moehlman, daughter of theologian Conrad Henry Moehlman and Bertha Young Moehlman, on July 8, 1939.

He interned in pediatrics at Strong Memorial Hospital, Rochester, NY, in 1940-41; completed his residency in pediatrics at St. Louis Children's Hospital, St. Louis, MO, in 1941-43; and was instructor, assistant professor, and associate professor of pediatrics at the Washington University School of Medicine, St. Louis, MO, 1943-1950 (with a year as pediatrician at the Los Alamos Hospital, Los Alamos, NM, in 1946-47). He served as chair of the Department of Pediatrics, Southwestern Medical School; medical director, Texas Children’s Hospital; and chief of pediatric staff, Parkland Hospital--all in Dallas, TX, in 1950-53. (Note that the picture of Forbes in "The History of the Department of Pediatrics" is misattributed; Forbes' picture is labeled "Edward Pratt.") In 1953, he returned to the University of Rochester School of Medicine & Dentistry, where he was associate professor (1953-57), professor (1957-1992), co-chair of the department (1974-76), and professor emeritus of pediatrics from 1992 until his death on June 26, 2003. He also held joint appointments in radiation biology and biophysics.

== Research ==
Forbes worked with radiation biologists to conduct research on body composition, metabolism, and the interactions of body fat and lean weight with both over and under nutrition. During his year (1946-47) as a practicing pediatrician in Los Alamos at the site of the Manhattan project, through an arrangement with the Washington University School of Medicine, he received training in radioisotope methods and techniques. He was first to systematically use the isotopic dilution method for estimating total body sodium in humans in a 1951 journal article. At the University of Rochester, he developed the technique of counting potassium-40 emissions from the human body and using the results to estimate people's lean weight (K-40 ions are relatively constant in lean mass) and their body fat, publishing the first article on the application of this method in 1961. Measurements, which he took periodically on himself for many years, in addition to recruiting people of all ages, involved the subject sitting in a comfortable chair in a steel-clad enclosure (whole-body counter) for about 30 minutes. Subjects were provided with earphones to listen to music and were carefully informed that they were not being exposed to radiation--rather, the machinery was counting the potassium-40 ions that the human body emits on a continuous basis. His measurements enabled him to get at longitudinal changes in lean body mass and body fat as influenced by normal growth, overfeeding, fasting, use of anabolic steroids, exercise, and pregnancy. One of several practically important lines of study was his work examining growth curves for lean weight for adolescent boys and girls. Boys gain lean weight at a faster rate than girls and have a longer adolescent growth spurt, hence requiring more nitrogen and calcium than girls and an equal amount of iron during their growth spurt as menstruating adolescent girls. He pulled together his work and observations in a textbook published by Springer-Verlag in 1987, Human Body Composition: Growth, Aging, Nutrition, and Activity.

== Awards and honors ==
Forbes held a National Institute of Child Health and Human Development Research Career Development Award for over 40 years (1962-2003).

He received the Borden Award of the American Academy of Pediatrics in 1964; the Dr. Albert David Kaiser Medal of the Rochester Academy of Medicine in 1979; the John Howland Award of the American Pediatric Society in 1992; and the University of Rochester Arthur Kornberg Research Award (1997). He was posthumously announced as the second recipient of the University of Rochester School of Medicine and Dentistry Alumni Service Award in 2003.

Forbes served as president of the Society for Pediatric Research (1960-61) and vice-president of the American Pediatric Society (1975-76).

He served on the editorial board of the American Journal of Diseases of Children (AJDC) (1964-73); as associate editor of the AJDC (1964-72); and as chief editor (1973-82). He was also associate editor of Nutrition Reviews (1961-71) and on the editorial board of Pediatrics beginning in 1984.
