= Philip Sidney Bernstein =

American rabbi and advisor to US Army during WW2

Philip S. Bernstein
- Title: Rabbi

Personal life
- Born: Philip Sidney Bernstein; June 29, 1901 Rochester, New York
- Died: December 3, 1985 (aged 84) Brighton, New York
- Education: Syracuse University; Jewish Institute of Religion

Religious life
- Religion: Judaism
- Denomination: Reform Judaism

Jewish leader
- Synagogue: Temple B'rith Kodesh

Philip Sidney Bernstein (June 29, 1901 – December 3, 1985) was a reform rabbi who served as the advisor to the U.S. Army during World War II. After the war he helped find homes for over 200,000 displaced Jews.

== Biography ==
Bernstein was born on June 29, 1901, in Rochester, New York. He would study at Syracuse University as well as the Jewish Institute of Religion.

At the age of 25, in 1926, Bernstein returned to Rochester to serve as assistant rabbi of Temple B'rith Kodesh. Within the year he would be made the rabbi of the synagogue and go on to serve there for over 43 years.

In his capacity as a rabbi, Bernstein would begin taking a prominent role in fighting antisemitism; exemplified by his correspondence with his acquaintance Cardinal Edward Mooney. Bernstein requested the Cardinal join him in combatting Father Charles Coughlin and his antisemitic National Union for Social Justice.

During World War II Bernstein, a reform rabbi acted as the official advisor on Jewish affairs to United States Army commanders in Europe. He would also relate the stories of the Holocaust to the United States beginning in 1943. He would continue to serve in Europe, in this capacity after the end of the War. After the war, Bernstein would assist in resettling over 200,000 displaced European Jews. At the petition of Orthodox Jews living in displaced persons' camps, he adopted their proposition that copies of the Talmud should be printed to help support Jewish education in the refugee camps.

In the 1950s and 60s, Bernstein served as the president of the Central Conference of American Rabbis and chairman of the American Israel Public Affairs Committee.

Bernstein died in Brighton, New York on December 3, 1985, of heart failure.
