= James William McClendon Jr. =

American Christian theologian and ethicist

James Wm. McClendon Jr., in his office in Pasadena, CA in April 2000, a few months before his death.

James William McClendon Jr. (1924–2000) was a Christian theologian and ethicist in the Anabaptist tradition, though he preferred the term 'baptist' with a lower-case 'b'. He was married to philosopher Nancey Murphy, who is a senior faculty member at Fuller Theological Seminary.

== Biography ==
McClendon was born in Shreveport, Louisiana in 1924. He studied at the University of Texas, where he took some undergraduate classes with Robert Lee Moore, whom McClendon credits with providing rigor in his theological work. McClendon served in the United States Navy during the tail end of World War II, and was profoundly affected by what he saw in post-war Japan. He returned to complete his theological studies at Princeton Theological Seminary, eventually earning a Th.D. from Southwestern Baptist Theological Seminary. His main teaching positions were at Golden Gate Baptist Seminary, the Graduate Theological Union, and in the latter decade of his life, Fuller Theological Seminary.

== Career ==
For 46 years, McClendon taught theology at several institutions, including Golden Gate Baptist Theological Seminary, the University of San Francisco, Stanford University, the University of Notre Dame, Fuller Theological Seminary, Baylor University, Temple University, Goucher College, Saint Mary's College of California, and Church Divinity School of the Pacific.

McClendon helped found what came to be known as the narrative theology movement in the late 1960s. His system is post-foundationalist and primarily oriented toward constructing a theological-biblical hermeneutic for Christian communities to live more faithful lives in the world. His ethics is nonviolent and communal, and his doctrinal emphases include ecclesiology, eschatology, Christology, and resurrection. His other books include Convictions: Defusing Religious Relativism, coauthored with James M. Smith, and Biography as Theology. McClendon is frequently mentioned alongside John Howard Yoder and Stanley Hauerwas in seeking to reclaim the importance of character in theological ethics.

McClendon took strong political stands in the 1960s that resulted in serious setbacks to his academic career. Some students and faculty at Golden Gate Baptist Theological Seminary, in Mill Valley, California, became vocal and active in support of the civil rights movement in the U.S. South. As a result, the seminary in 1966 fired a junior faculty member involved in this effort, LeRoy Moore (1931-) (later a peace activist in Boulder, Colorado), and this led McClendon to resign from his tenured position at the seminary.

McClendon then took up a teaching post at the Jesuits' University of San Francisco, becoming the first Protestant to teach theology at a Catholic university. In 1968, McClendon organized the writing of an open letter by Democratic faculty members to President Lyndon B. Johnson urging withdrawal from the War in Vietnam. McClendon believed that this action resulted in his contract not being renewed at USF, and he had temporary teaching positions for the next several years.

McClendon regained stable academic employment when he took up a post at the Church Divinity School of the Pacific in 1971. The main appointment in his career was his tenure at the school, then a part of the Graduate Theological Union, throughout the 1970s and 1980s.

== Philosophical background ==
McClendon was influenced by the philosophy of J. L. Austin, and credits Austin with showing him a different way of going about the task of theology than he had previously thought possible. McClendon relies on Austin heavily and explicitly in his book Convictions, but Austin's influence can also be seen throughout his work. Later in his life, McClendon came to associate this shift as part of a broader philosophical shift from modern to postmodern modes of thinking and speaking, although he was always careful to specify that he was an adherent of "Anglo-American" postmodernity.

== Biography as theology ==
McClendon is perhaps best known for his argument in Biography as Theology, which introduced him as a member of the budding narrative theology movement. His thesis is that by paying careful attention to certain "striking" lives that we see from time to time, we will be able to identify guiding images, narratives, and convictions that made such people who they were, and that such lives will provide the means by which people may judge how theology should faithfully evolve for the current and next generation. So, for example, McClendon provided biographies of Martin Luther King Jr., Charles Ives, Dag Hammarskjöld, and Clarence Jordan in Biography as Theology, and explored how their lives both confirmed and affected the doctrine of Atonement in Christianity. In later work, McClendon would focus on Dietrich Bonhoeffer, Dorothy Day, Jonathan Edwards and Sarah Edwards, and Ludwig Wittgenstein, among others. McClendon believed this method was a helpful corrective to what he called "decisionism" in theological ethics, particularly as associated with the situational ethics of Joseph Fletcher. In short, McClendon believed that it was impossible to attend to the question of what one would do when facing a particular "hard situation" without providing a thicker, more detailed understanding of the "who" that was facing a dilemma; in this way McClendon was in line with the reclamation of virtue ethics and character ethics that took place in some theological circles beginning in the 1970s.

== The baptist vision ==
McClendon worked in service to adherents of what he termed "the baptist vision." The 'b' was intentionally de-capitalized in order to point out the superfluity of the pejorative "ana" applied to the Anabaptists in the 16th century. For McClendon, the baptist vision is a communal hermeneutical orientation taken by congregations and individuals toward scripture and the world, in which the text is understood to be of immediate import to the community in question. McClendon often summarized the baptist vision with reference to Peter's speech in Acts 2:16 (KJV): "But this is that which was spoken by the prophet Joel"; in short, the baptist vision sees scripture and the world as though "this is that, and then is now."

Personal Life

McClendon grew up in Shreveport, Louisiana. Both sides of his family had deep roots in northwestern Louisiana, and were invested in forest land there. He continued this tradition through his life, and asked that his gravestone be inscribed with the phrase "tree farmer and baptist theologian." McClendon's first wife was the former Marie Miles (1929-2005); they had two sons, James William McClendon III (1950-) and Thomas Vernon McClendon (1954-). Before becoming a professor of theology, McClendon was pastor of churches in Ringgold, Louisiana and Sydney, New South Wales, Australia; late in life he was interim pastor of a Church of the Brethren in Altadena, California. McClendon was proud of his southern roots, but took deep enjoyment in his 46 years of living in California, including enjoying backpacking and sailing. Toward the end of his life, McClendon became involved with Shiloh Baptist Church, an African-American church bordering on forest land that McClendon owned in Mooringsport, Louisiana. McClendon's funeral was held at this church (where folk and blues star Leadbelly is buried), and he is buried on private land nearby.

== Selected bibliography ==
- Pacemakers of Christian Thought, Broadman Press, 1962.
- Biography as Theology, Abingdon Press, 1974.
- Understanding Religious Convictions, University of Notre Dame Press, 1975.
- Is God God? (edited with Axel D. Steuer), Abingdon Press, 1981.
- Convictions: Diffusing Religious Relativism (with James M Smith), Trinity Press, 1994. (revised version of Understanding Religious Convictions)
- Baptist Roots: A Reader in the Theology of a Christian People (with Curtis W. Freeman and C. Rosalee Velloso da Silva), Judson Press, 1999.
- Ethics: Systematic Theology Volume 1, Abingdon Press, 1986.
- Doctrine: Systematic Theology Volume 2, Abingdon Press, 1994.
- Witness: Systematic Theology Volume 3, Abingdon Press, 2000.
- The Collected Works of James Wm. McClendon, Jr.: Volume 1
- The Collected Works of James Wm. McClendon, Jr.: Volume 2
- The Collected Works of James Wm. McClendon, Jr.: Volume 3
