= Colgate Rochester Crozer Divinity School =

American Baptist seminary in New York

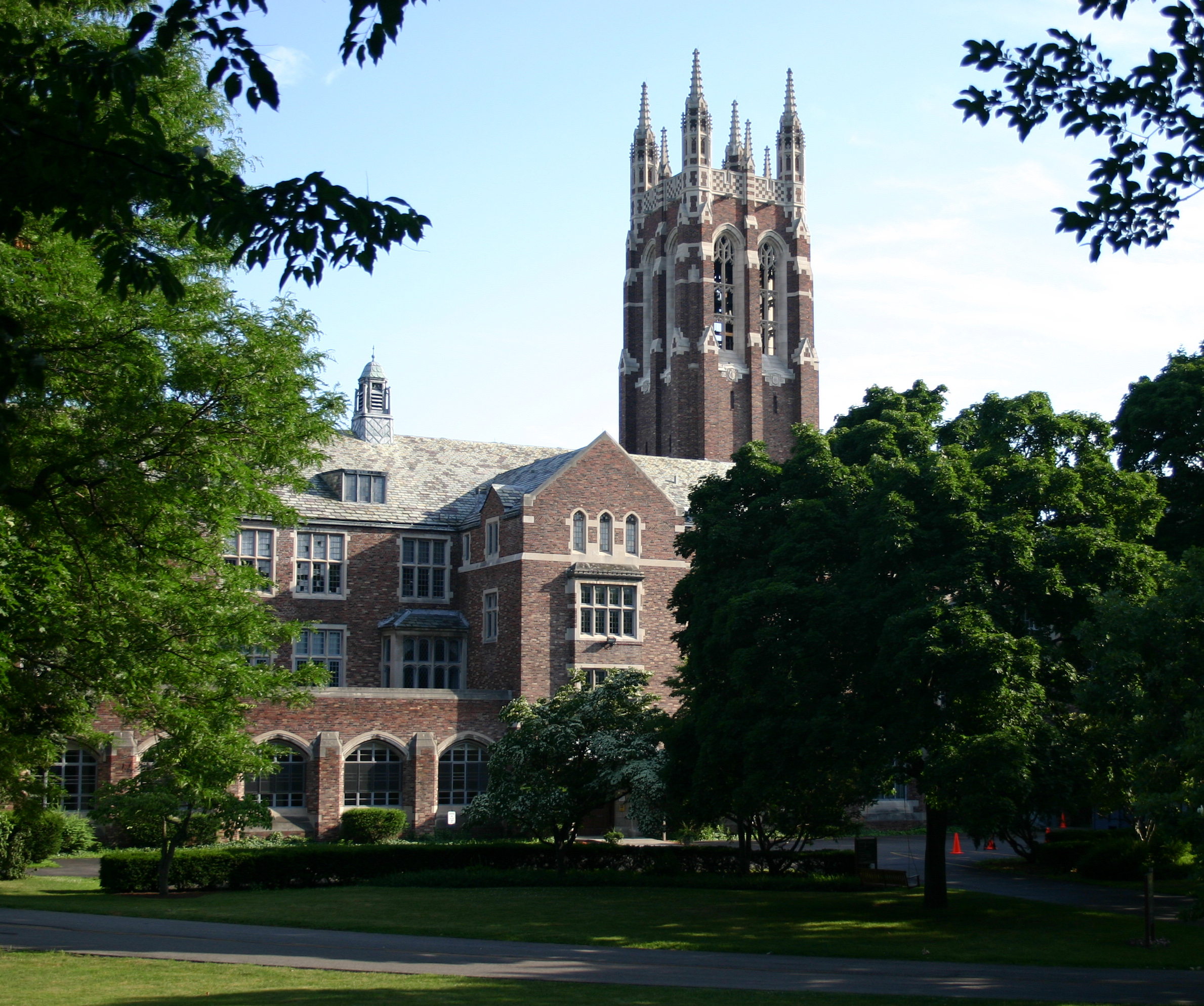
- 1100 S. Goodman St. campus (1928–2019)
- Other name: CRCDS
- Former names: Hamilton Theological Institution, Colgate Theological Seminary, Rochester Theological Seminary, Colgate Rochester Divinity School, Baptist Missionary Training School, Crozer Theological Seminary
- Type: Seminary
- Established: 1850; 176 years ago
- Religious affiliation: American Baptist Churches USA, Association of Welcoming and Affirming Baptists
- President: Angela D. Sims
- Faculty: 4
- Students: 77
- Location: Rochester, New York, United States; 43.159917°N 77.584028°W
- Campus: Urban
- Colors
- Website: www.crcds.edu

Colgate Rochester Crozer Divinity School is a Baptist seminary in Rochester, New York. It is affiliated with the American Baptist Churches USA and the Association of Welcoming and Affirming Baptists.

== History ==
=== 1820s–1960: Early history ===
Four Baptist institutions merged over the course of the 19th and 20th centuries to form Colgate Rochester Crozer Divinity School (CRCDS) as it exists today. Its earliest roots are in the Hamilton Literary and Theological Institution (later Colgate Theological Seminary), which began in Hamilton, New York, in the early 1820s under the auspices of the New York Baptist Union for Ministerial Education. Soap and candle magnate William Colgate, a devout Baptist, was an influential trustee in the Union for Ministerial Education and took an active role in financing and championing Hamilton Institution. Hamilton Literary and Theological Institution later evolved in part into Colgate University.

The present-day seminary's second heritage institution, the Rochester Theological Seminary, was formed in 1850 at the founding of the University of Rochester by a group from Colgate Theological Seminary who sought a more urban educational setting. Women were accepted, enrolled, and graduated as regular students beginning in 1920. The remainder of the Hamilton seminary had moved to Rochester by 1928, when the two seminaries merged to become Colgate Rochester Divinity School and moved to the 1100 South Goodman Street campus in Rochester.

=== 1960s: Time of turbulence ===
In 1961, the school was joined by its third legacy institution, the Baptist Missionary Training School, a women's school in Chicago founded by the Women's Baptist Home Mission Society.

Persuaded by student advocacy and protest throughout 1968 and 1969—namely by the school's Black Student Caucus—Colgate Rochester Divinity School hired more African-American professors to join the school's overwhelmingly white faculty, increased course offerings in African-American religious and cultural studies, and formally established the Martin Luther King Jr. Program of Black Church Studies in 1969. It was one of the first such programs instituted at a predominantly white seminary or divinity school in the U.S.

=== 1970–present: Colgate Rochester Crozer Divinity School ===
The last significant institutional merger took place in 1970, when Crozer Theological Seminary moved from Upland, Pennsylvania to merge with Colgate Rochester Divinity School, and form Colgate Rochester Crozer Divinity School in Rochester, New York.

The Divinity School shared its South Goodman Street facilities with several organizations over the years. St. Bernard's School of Theology and Ministry, a Roman Catholic theological school, occupied the South Goodman Street campus from 1981 until 2003, when it relocated to another site in the area. The American Baptist Historical Society, serving the American Baptist Churches USA, also occupied the South Goodman Street campus in varying capacity from 1955 to 2008, when the Society's offices and archival collections were relocated to Mercer University in Atlanta.

After selling its historic 90-year-old campus next to Highland Park in 2016, Colgate Rochester Crozer Divinity School moved 2.2 miles north in 2019 to Village Gate Square in Rochester's Neighborhood of the Arts, near the George Eastman Museum and Memorial Art Gallery.

=== Presidents ===
No.	Name	Term	Ref
Rochester Theological Seminary
1	Ezekiel Gilman Robinson	1868–1872	
2	Augustus Hopkins Strong	1872–1912	
–	Joseph W. A. Stewart (Note: Served as acting president)	1912–1915	
3	Clarence A. Barbour	1915–1928	
Colgate Rochester Divinity School
1	Clarence A. Barbour	1928–1929	
2	Albert W. Beaven	1929–1943	
–	George Barton Cutten	1943–1944	
3	Edwin M. Poteat	1944–1949	
4	Wilbour Eddy Saunders	1949–1960	
5	Gene Ebert Bartlett	1960–1970	
Colgate Rochester Crozer Divinity School
6	Arthur Raymond McKay	1970–1973	
7	Leon Pacala	1973–1980	
8	Larry L. Greenfield	1980–1989	
9	James H. Evans Jr.	1990–2000	
10	G. Thomas Halbrooks	2000–2006	
11	Eugene C. Bay	2006–2010	
–	Jack Marston McKelvey (Note: Served as interim president)	2010–2011	
12	Marvin A. McMickle	2011–2019	
13	Angela D. Sims	2019–present	

== Academics ==
Graduates programs include:

- Master of Arts (M.A.)
- Master of Divinity (M.Div.)
- Doctor of Ministry (D.Min.)

== Affiliations ==
Colgate Rochester Crozer Divinity School is accredited by the Association of Theological Schools in the United States and Canada (ATS). It is affiliated with the American Baptist Churches USA and the Association of Welcoming and Affirming Baptists.

== Beliefs ==
The school has an inclusive Christian mission statement.

== Notable people ==
=== Notable alumni ===
- James E. Cheek (1932–2010), former president of Howard University
- Isabel Crawford (1865–1961), Baptist missionary who worked with the Kiowa in Oklahoma Territory using Plains Indian Sign Language; graduated from Baptist Missionary Training School in Chicago
- Edwin T. Dahlberg (1892–1986), American Baptist Church leader, pacifist, and Colgate trustee
- Frederick German Detweiler (1881–1960), American sociologist
- Joseph K. Dixon (1856-1926), Photographer, advocate for American Indians
- James Alexander Forbes, Jr. (1935–), Senior Minister Emeritus of the Riverside Church in New York City.
- William Hamilton (1924–2012), leading theologian in the Death of God movement.
- Cecil Hobbs (1907–1991), historian specializing in Southeast Asia, charter member of the Association for Asian Studies, and United Methodist pastor
- Martin Luther King Jr. (1929–1968), minister, activist, prominent leader in the civil rights movement; attended Crozer Theological Seminary in Upland, Pennsylvania before its merger with Colgate Divinity School in 1970
- Samuel B. McKinney (1926–2018), Baptist pastor and civil rights leader
- Joanna P. Moore (1832–1916), Baptist missionary to freed African Americans in the Reconstruction era South; graduated from Baptist Missionary Training School in Chicago
- Michele Pollesel (1949–2025), Anglican bishop of Uruguay
- Lorraine K. Potter, Chief of Chaplains of the U.S. Air Force
- Howard Thurman, author, civil rights leader, Dean of Chapel for Howard University and Boston University
- Henry Clay Vedder, Professor of church history at Crozer Theological Seminary and author of twenty-seven books
- Wyatt Tee Walker, Co-founder of Southern Christian Leadership Conference (SCLC) (1957), Executive Dir. SCLC (1960–1964); Senior Pastor, Canaan Baptist Church in Harlem (1967–2004)
- Frederick B. Williams, Canon and Rector of Church of the Intercession, Harlem (1972–2005); Founder of Harlem Congregations for Community Improvement

=== Notable faculty ===
- Conrad Henry Moehlman (1879–1961), church historian
- Gayraud Wilmore (1921–2020), ethicist, historian, theologian, and civil rights leader known for scholarly contributions in the history of African American church and religious experience and black theology

=== Notable alumni/faculty ===
Notable individuals who both graduated from and served on the faculty of the school:

- Walter Rauschenbusch (1861–1918), Baptist pastor and theologian integral to the Social Gospel movement
- Leonard Sweet (1961–), author, preacher, scholar
