= Larry =

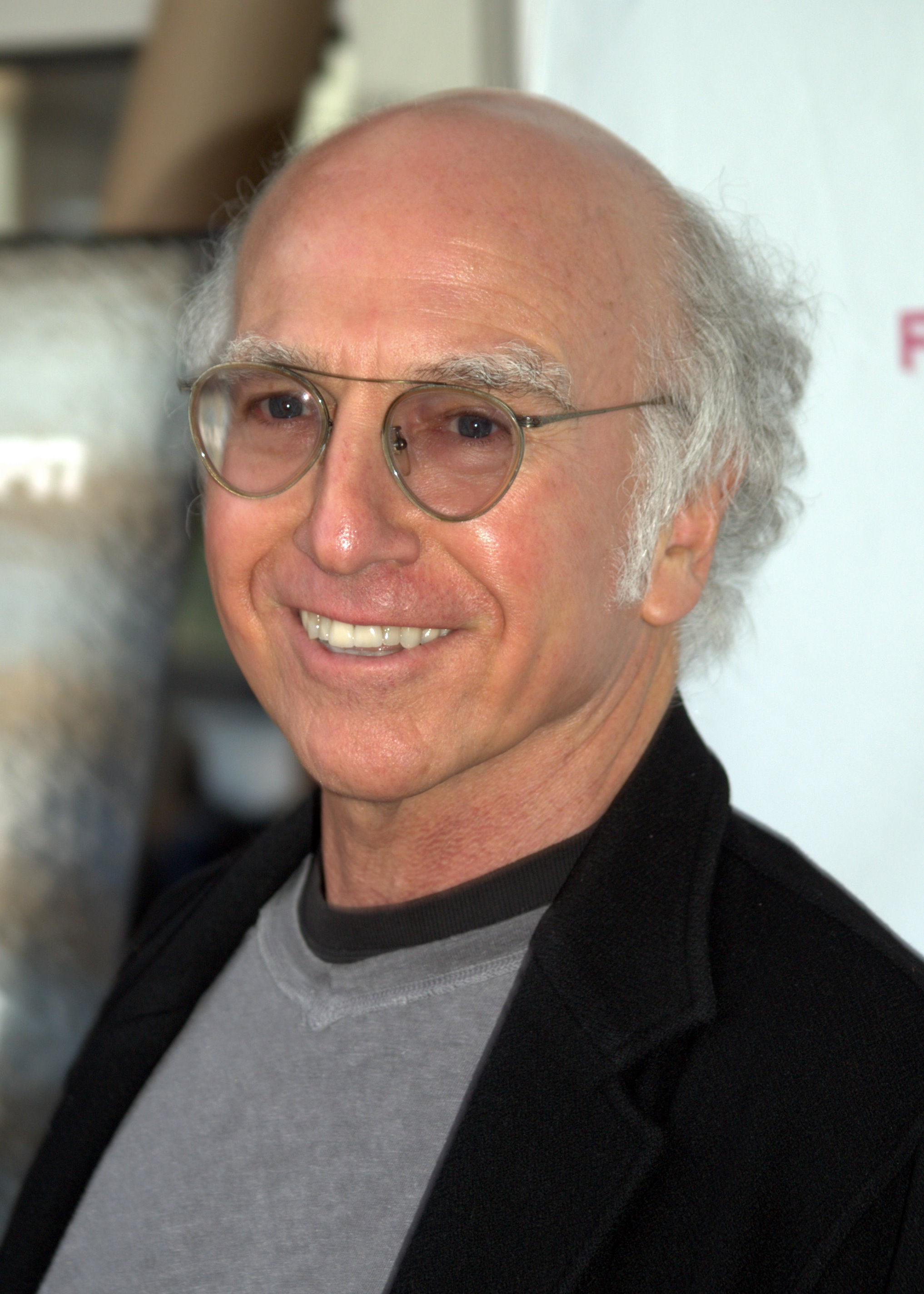
- Larry David in 2009
- Pronunciation: /ˈlæ.ri/
- Gender: Male

Origin
- Language: English
- Meaning: Laurel crowned or From Laurentum, Italy

Other names
- Related names: Lawrence, Laurence, Lorenzo

Larry is a masculine given name in English, derived from Lawrence or Laurence. It can be a shortened form of those names.

Larry may refer to the following:

== People ==
=== A ===
- Larry D. Alexander, American artist/writer
- Larry Andersen, American baseball pitcher and analyst
- Larry Allen, American football player

=== B ===
- Larry Boone, American country singer
- Larry Bakman, American attorney
- Larry Brown (infielder), major league infielder in the 1970s and 1980s, mainly with the Cleveland Indians
- Larry Bird, American Hall-of-Fame National Basketball Association player
- Larry Barretta, American football player
- Larry Beightol (1942–2024), American football coach
- Larry Borom (born 1999), American football player

=== C ===
- Larry Carlton (born 1948), American jazz guitarist and singer
- Larry Csonka, American wrestling journalist
- Larry Csonka, American football player

=== D ===
- Larry Drew (born 1958), American basketball player and coach
- Larry Drew II (born 1990), American basketball player
- Larry Dyck (born 1965), Canadian ice hockey goaltender
- Larry DeGraw, (born c. 1941), Canadian football player
- Larry Dossey (born 1940), Texas internist and author

=== E ===
- Larry Emdur, Australian television personality
- Larry Eyler, American serial killer and kidnapper

=== F ===
- Larry Feign, American cartoonist working in Hong Kong
- Larry Ferrari (1932-1997), American organist
- Larry Fine (1902–1975), American comedian and actor, one of the Three Stooges
- Larry Fitzgerald, American football player
- Larry Ford (American football), American football player
- Larry Flynt (1942–2021), American publisher

=== G ===
- Larry Gatlin, American country singer
- Larry Gayao (better known as Larry g(EE)), Filipino-American soul-pop artist
- Larry Gelbart (1928–2009), American screenwriter, playwright, director and author
- Larry Graham, founder of American funk band Graham Central Station
- Larry Gene Ashbrook, mass murderer
- Larry Gene Bell, American murderer and possible serial killer
- Larry Gbevlo-Lartey, Ghanaian soldier and businessman
- Larry L. Greenfield, educator

=== H ===
- Larry Hagman, American actor, best known for the TV series I Dream of Jeannie and Dallas
- Larry Heath, Australian entrepreneur and publisher, founder of the National Live Music Awards
- Larry Henley (1937–2014), American singer and songwriter, member of The Newbeats
- Larry Hovis, American actor and singer
- Larry Hisle, major league outfielder with Philadelphia Phillies, Brewers, and Twins
- Larry Hollyfield (born 1950/1951), American basketball player
- Larry Hughes, US basketball player
- Larry Huras, Canadian NHL ice hockey player and coach
- Larry Hennig (1936–2018), American professional wrestler
- Larry Holmes (born 1949), American boxer
- Larry Dewayne Hall (born 1962), American murderer, rapist, and possible serial killer
- Larry Hoover, gang leader
- Larry Gene Heien (1937–1991), American linguist
- Larry Huggins, (born c. 1950), president of Riteway-Huggins Construction Services

=== I ===
- Larry Ivie (1936–2014), American writer
- Larry Izamoje (born 1962), Nigerian journalist
- Larry Isaac, American sociologist
- Larry Ivy (born 1943), American athletic administrator

=== J ===
- Larry Joyner (born 1964), American football player
- Larry Johnson (basketball, born 1969), American basketball player
- Larry Johnson (running back), American football player
- Larry Jusdanis, Canadian football player
- Larry Jackson (racing driver) (born 1974), Canadian racing driver
- Larry C. Johnson, former CIA intelligence officer and political commentator
- Larry Chipper Jones, Atlanta Braves third baseman-outfielder

=== K ===
- Larry Kenney, American radio DJ and voice actor on Imus in the Morning
- Larry Keller, American football player
- Larry Koroloff (born 1951), Bulgarian historian and educator

=== L ===
- Larry Lavender, American dancer and scholar
- Larry Lujack (1940–2013), American radio disc jockey
- Larry Linne, American football player
- Larry L'Estrange (1934–2007), MBE, Irish rugby player
- Larry Lemanski, director of the Biomedical Institute for Regenerative Research
- M. Larry Lawrence, U.S. Ambassador to Switzerland

=== M ===
- Larry Mathews (born 1955), American actor
- Larry Mathews (musician), Irish musician
- Larry McMurtry, American novelist
- Larry Mallory (born 1952), American football player
- Larry Mann (1930–1952), American racing driver
- Larry Matthews (born 1969), Canadian Paralympic volleyball player

=== N ===
- Larry Neufeld, Canadian politician
- Larry Nance, American National Basketball Association player
- Larry Nixon (born 1950), American professional fisherman
- Larry A. Nagahara, American physicist, member of the National Cancer Institute

=== O ===
- Larry Ogunjobi, American football player
- Larry O'Dea (1944–1997), Australian professional wrestler
- Larry Olsen (jockey) (born 1948), American jockey and reporter

=== P ===
- Larry Page (singer) (1936–2024), English pop singer and record producer
- Larry Poole, American actor and film producer
- Larry Pemberton, American politician
- Larry Plancke (born c. 1947), Canadian football player
- Larry Winters (1956–2015), American professional wrestler
- Larry Eugene Phillips, Jr., bank robber and leader of the High Incident Bandits
- Larry Pusateri, American fugitive

=== Q ===
- Larry Quinn (ice hockey), American ice hockey executive
- Larry Que (1963–2016), Filipino journalist
- Larry Qualls, American visual arts archival documentarian

=== R ===
- Larry Ramos (1942–2014), American musician, member of the band the Association
- Larry Ribstein (1946–2011), American law professor
- Larry Riley (basketball), General Manager of the Golden State Warriors
- Larry Robinson Canadian NHL ice hockey player
- Larry Rose III, American football player
- Larry Rountree III (born 1998), American football player
- Larry Ralston (born 1949), American serial killer and rapist

=== S ===
- Larry Sanders (born 1954), American singer aka L.V.
- Larry Santos (born 1941), American pop music singer-songwriter
- Larry Shay (1897–1988), American songwriter
- Larry Söder (born 1969), Swedish politician
- Larry Sanders (basketball) (born 1988), American National Basketball Association player
- Larry Seivers, American football player
- Larry Sherrer, American football player
- Larry Sharpe (wrestler) (1951–2017), Irish-American professional wrestler
- Larry J. Seidman (1950–2017), American neuropsychologist
- Larry Slack, American child abuser

=== T ===
- Larry Thibos, American scientist and academic

=== U ===
- Larry Uteck (1952–2002), Canadian football player and coach

=== V ===
- Larry Verne (1936–2013), American singer

=== W ===
- Larry Wallis (1949–2019), English rock guitarist and songwriter, early member of the rock band Motörhead
- Larry Walters (1949–1993) American truck driver, also known as Lawn Chair Larry
- Larry Wilmore, American political satirist, and host of The Nightly Show with Larry Wilmore
- Larry Wall, creator of the Perl computer language
- Larry Walker, Canadian major league outfielder
- Larry Walbridge, American football player
- Larry Wijeratne (1950–1998), Sri Lankan Sinhala army major general
- Larry Wu-Tai Chin, Chinese double agent who worked in the CIA

=== Y ===
- Larry Young (politician) (born 1949), American politician
- Larry Young (musician) (1940–1978), American jazz organist
- Larry Yung (born 1942), Chinese businessman
- Larry Young (umpire) (born 1954), American baseball umpire
- Larry Yang, Chinese film director
- Larry Yaeger (born 1950), American informatician and software designer

=== Z ===
- Larry Ziegler (born 1939), American professional golfer

=== Lawrence ===
- Larry Ellison, co-founder of Oracle Corporation
- Larry Page, co-founder of Google
- Larry Sanger, co-founder of Wikipedia
- Larry Collins, American musician, member of the rockabilly sibling duo The Collins Kids
- Larry David (born 1947), Emmy-winning American actor, writer, comedian, producer and film director
- Larry Gates, American actor
- Larry Junstrom (1949–2019), American bassist, founding member of the rock band Lynyrd Skynyrd
- Larry Knechtel (1940–2009), American keyboardist and bassist
- Larry Storch (1923–2022), American actor and comedian, best known for his TV work in F Troop
- Larry Taylor (1942–2019), American bassist, member of the rock band Canned Heat
- Larry Craig, former US senator from Idaho
- Larry Kelly (born c. 1935), American politician
- Larry King (1933–2021), American talk show host of Larry King Live on CNN
- Larry O'Brien (1917–1990), American politician and basketball commissioner
- Larry Sanders (politician) (born 1935), American-born British academic, social worker and Green Party activist, brother of Bernie Sanders
- Larry Anderson (baseball), American baseball pitcher for the Brewers White Sox
- Larry Bowa, former shortstop for Phillies, Mets, and Cubs and former manager for Padres and Phillies
- Larry Doby, first black baseball player in American League
- Larry Jackson (baseball), major league pitcher in the 1950s and 1960s for the Cardinals, Cubs and Phillies
- Larry Sherry, Los Angeles Dodgers pitcher
- Larry Brown (basketball) (born 1940), American Hall-of-Fame basketball All-Star player and coach
- Larry Shyatt, American basketball coach
- Larry Murphy (ice hockey), Canadian NHL ice hockey player
- Larry Beil (American football), American football player
- Larry Critchfield, American football player
- Larry Dick, American football player
- Larry Knorr, (1917–1996), American football player
- Larry Peace, American football player
- Larry Rentz, American football player
- Larry Steinbach, American football player
- Larry Chene (1924–1964), American professional wrestler
- Larry Zbyszko (born 1951), American professional wrestler and commentator
- Larry Lawton, American author and ex-convict
- Larry Nassar (born 1963), American serial child molester
- Larry Ray (born 1959), American criminal convicted of sex trafficking, extortion, forced labor, and other offenses, sentenced to 60 years in prison
- Larry Singleton, rapist and mutilator
- Larry Kosilla, American businessman and YouTuber
- Larry Sass, architectural designer
- Larry Hogan (born 1956), former Governor of the U.S. state of Maryland
- Larry the Cable Guy, stage name of American comedian Daniel Lawrence Whitney (born 1963)

=== Laurence ===
- Larry Miller, an American guitarist from Ann Arbor, Michigan
- Larry Mullen Jr., Irish drummer and founder of the group U2
- Larry Niven, American science fiction author

=== Multiple individuals ===
- Larry Brown (disambiguation)
- Larry Gordon (disambiguation)
- Larry Harris (disambiguation)
- Larry Johnson (disambiguation)
- Larry Miller (disambiguation)
- Larry Murphy (disambiguation)
- Larry Phillips (disambiguation)
- Larry Scott (disambiguation)
- Larry Smith (disambiguation)
- Larry Young (disambiguation)

=== Other or indeterminate ===
- Larry June, American rapper
- Larry Zeidel, Canadian NHL ice hockey player
- Larry Reed, American shadow puppeteer
- Larry Stylinson, a name blended fandomship of musicians Harry Styles and Louis Tomlinson
- Lost Boy Larry, nickname for a presumed missing boy in Albuquerque, New Mexico, whose cries for help were broadcast over CB radio for several days in August 1973 (later deemed a hoax by state authorities)
- Larry (cat), Chief Mouser to the Cabinet Office since February 2011
- Larry (cartoonist), British cartoonist

== In fiction ==
=== Animation ===
- Larry the Cucumber, character from VeggieTales; also goes by the alter-ego of Larryboy
- Larry the Lobster, a lifeguard on SpongeBob SquarePants
- Larry Palaroncini, character from Homestar Runner that plays in the band Limozeen
- Larry Burns (The Simpsons), the son of Mr. Burns, portrayed by Rodney Dangerfield in The Simpsons
- Larry, a character in Pakdam Pakdai and Rat-A-Tat

=== Movies and television ===
- Doctor Laurence Erhardt, one of the original mad scientists from Mystery Science Theater 3000 TV series
- Larry Appleton, a character on the American sitcom television series Perfect Strangers, often referred to as Cousin Larry (1986–1993)
- Larry Blaisdell, character played by Larry Bagby III on Buffy the Vampire Slayer
- Larry Dallas, Jack Tripper's best friend from the ABC sitcom Three's Company (1977–1984)
- Larry Emdur, a host on the Morning Show, Channel 7, Australia
- Larry Fleinhardt, a character who is a theoretical physicist, cosmologist, and CalSci professor in the CBS crime drama NUMB3RS, played by Peter MacNicol
- Larry "Bud" Melman, recurring character on David Letterman shows
- Larry Sanders, titular character on the American sitcom The Larry Sanders Show (1992–1998)
- Larry Tate, on the TV series Bewitched

=== Video games ===
- Larry Butz, the friend of Phoenix Wright in the Ace Attorney series
- Larry Laffer, a character from the Leisure Suit Larry adult video game series
- Larry Koopa, one of the Koopalings in the Super Mario Bros. series
- Larry, a Gym Leader and Elite Four member from Pokémon Scarlet and Violet

== See also ==
- Lari (given name)
- Larri
- Laurence (disambiguation)
- Laurentius (disambiguation)
- Lawrence (disambiguation)
