= Coins of the Maldivian rufiyaa =

Coins ranging from 1 laari to 2 rufiyaa

The coins of the Maldivian rufiyaa are documented since it became a British protectorate in 1304 AH (1887).

The Maldive Islands were granted independence outside the Commonwealth of Nations as an independent monarchy. The 2nd Republic was declared in November 1968. The Maldive Islands returned to the Commonwealth in 1982. The Maldives was again temporarily outside the Commonwealth from October 2016 until 1 February 2020, when they returned to the Commonwealth.

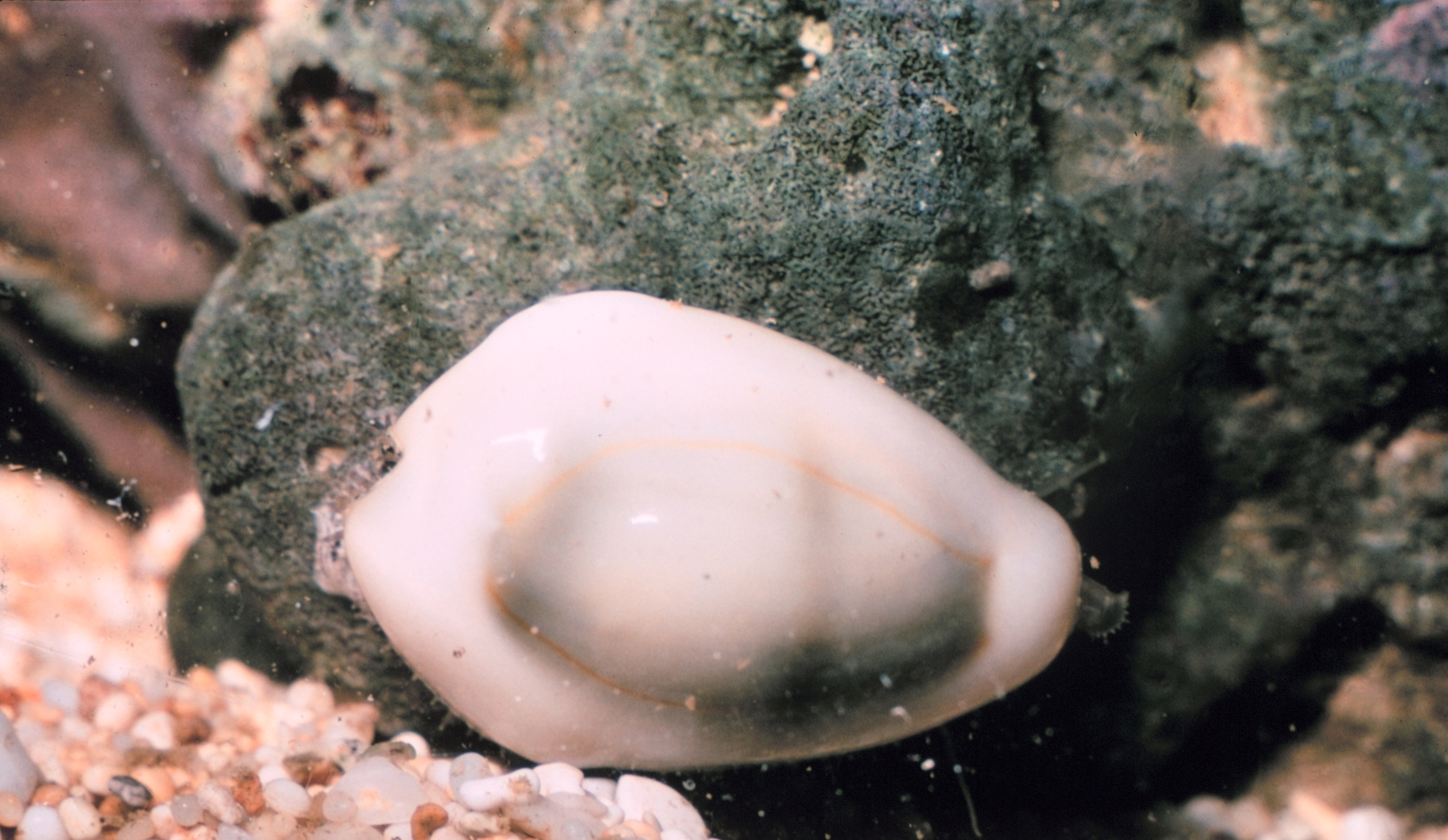
Before coinage, when shells of Cypraea moneta (money cowrie) were used as currency in the Maldives, it was valued as follows: 5 pieces = 1 agi; 25 agi = 1 hiya; 8 hiya = 1 fau; 12 fau = 1 kotté.

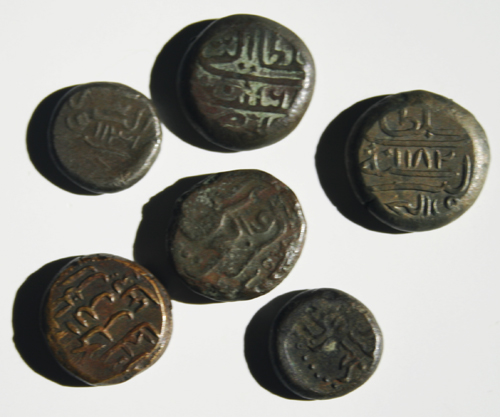
Maldivian coins from the 17th and 18th century.

Note about the Islamic calendar: The dates do not always correspond exactly, as the AH year is 11 days shorter than a year on the Gregorian calendar.

== Coins issued from 1900–1902 ==
Copper laari from Sultan Shamsudeen III's reign

In 1318 AH (1900), a copper larin (or laari) was struck. In 1319 AH (1901), a copper laari was also struck. In 1320 AH (1902), a copper laari and a 4 laari was struck.

== Coins issued from 1913 ==
These coins were an issue of 1 laari and 4 laari coins that were struck in 1331 AH (1913) at Heaton's Mint in Birmingham, England, despite the fact that they are inscribed 'Struck at Malé' in Arabic.

== Coins issued from 1960 ==
These coins were the last coins to have been issued under the British protectorate. They were also the only coins to have been struck during the reign of Sultan Mohammed Farid Didi (1954–1968). These coins were struck at the Royal Mint in London. They have the same dimensions as the coins of Ceylon, which were in everyday circulation in the Maldive Islands. The coins that were struck in 1960 were the following denominations:

- 1 laari
- 2 laari
- 5 laari
- 10 laari
- 25 laari
- 50 laari

There were two types of 25 and 50 laari coins. The first type has a security groove on the edge of the coin, and the other has a reeded edge. The coins are entirely inscribed in Arabic and Divehi.

The first coins to be issued by the Maldive Islands in the period outside the Commonwealth (1965–1982) was the issue of 1389 AH (1970). In this period, the first coins denominated in rufiyaa were struck. Only in the late 1970s do the dates on Maldivian coins begin to correspond exactly (e.g. the 1399 AH (1979) and 1400 AH (1980) silver 100 rufiyaa commemorative coins). Only in the late 1970s did English first appear on Maldivian coins.

First series (1960)
Image	Value	Diameter (mm)	Mass (g)	Composition	Edge	Obverse	Reverse	Issue
	1 laari	15.00 (squared)	1.50	Bronze	Smooth	Lettering (Arabic): Malé the Maldives; value (Dhivehi)	Coat of arms; year of issue (Gregorian and Hijri)	1960
	1 laari	15.00 (squared)	0.456	Aluminum	Smooth	Lettering (Arabic): Malé the Maldives; value (Dhivehi)	Coat of arms; year of issue (Gregorian and Hijri)	1970–1979
	2 laari	18.20 (squared)	3.15	Bronze	Smooth	Lettering (Arabic): Malé the Maldives; value (Dhivehi)	Coat of arms; year of issue (Gregorian and Hijri)	1960
	2 laari	18.20 (squared)	0.948	Aluminum	Smooth	Lettering (Arabic): Malé the Maldives; value (Dhivehi)	Coat of arms; year of issue (Gregorian and Hijri)	1970–1979
	5 laari	20.32 (scalloped)	2.70	Nickel brass	Smooth	Lettering (Arabic): Malé the Maldives; value (Dhivehi)	Coat of arms; year of issue (Gregorian and Hijri)	1960
	5 laari	20.32 (scalloped)	1.00	Aluminum	Smooth	Lettering (Arabic): Malé the Maldives; value (Dhivehi)	Coat of arms; year of issue (Gregorian and Hijri)	1970–1979
	10 laari	23.11 (scalloped)	5.30	Nickel brass	Smooth	Lettering (Arabic): Malé the Maldives; value (Dhivehi)	Coat of arms; year of issue (Gregorian and Hijri)	1960
	10 laari	23.11 (scalloped)	1.95	Aluminum	Smooth	Lettering (Arabic): Malé the Maldives; value (Dhivehi)	Coat of arms; year of issue (Gregorian and Hijri)	1960–1979
	25 laari	20.19	4.15	Nickel brass	Security	Lettering (Arabic): Malé the Maldives; value (Dhivehi)	Coat of arms; year of issue (Gregorian and Hijri)	1960
	25 laari	20.19	4.15	Nickel brass	Reeded	Lettering (Arabic): Malé the Maldives; value (Dhivehi)	Coat of arms; year of issue (Gregorian and Hijri)	1960–1979
	50 laari	23.60	5.65	Nickel brass	Security	Lettering (Arabic): Malé the Maldives; value (Dhivehi)	Coat of arms; year of issue (Gregorian and Hijri)	1960
	50 laari	23.60	5.65	Nickel brass	Reeded	Lettering (Arabic): Malé the Maldives; value (Dhivehi)	Coat of arms; year of issue (Gregorian and Hijri)	1960–1979

== Current issue ==
The first coin to be issued after the return of the Maldive Islands' return to the Commonwealth was the 1 rufiyaa coin dated 1402 AH (1982). This coin has the coat of arms on the obverse with the dates. The reverse of the coin is inscribed 'REPUBLIC OF MALDIVES 1 RUFIYAA'. A series of minor coins denominated from 1 laari to 50 laari was released into circulation in 1404 AH (1984). Since then, a number of commemorative coins have been struck, including a series of 250 rufiyaa medal-coins (listed in the 2005 edition of Krause Unusual World Coins catalogue). In 1995, the 2 rufiyaa coin was released into circulation to replace the 2 rufiyaa banknote.

A bimetallic 2 rufiyaa coin was released into circulation in 2017, replacing the previous version of the coin issued in 1995.

Second series (1982–2017)
Image	Value	Diameter (mm)	Mass (g)	Composition	Edge	Obverse	Reverse	Issue
	1 laari	15.00	0.456	Aluminum	Smooth	Lettering: Maldives and ދިވެހިރާއްޖޭ ; value (English and Dhivehi)	Coconut palm; year of issue (Gregorian and Hijri)	1984
	5 laari	20.32 (scalloped)	2.00	Aluminum	Smooth	Lettering: Maldives and ދިވެހިރާއްޖޭ ; value (English and Dhivehi)	Tuna; year of issue (Gregorian and Hijri)	1984–1990
	5 laari	16.85	0.62	Aluminum	Reeded	Lettering: Maldives and ދިވެހިރާއްޖޭ ; value (English and Dhivehi)	Tuna; year of issue (Gregorian and Hijri)	2012
	10 laari	23.11 (scalloped)	1.95	Aluminum	Smooth	Lettering: Maldives and ދިވެހިރާއްޖޭ ; value (English and Dhivehi)	Odi; year of issue (Gregorian and Hijri)	1984–2001
	10 laari	18.10	0.85	Aluminum	Smooth	Lettering: Maldives and ދިވެހިރާއްޖޭ ; value (English and Dhivehi)	Odi; year of issue (Gregorian and Hijri)	2012
	25 laari	20.19	4.15	Nickel brass	Reeded	Lettering: Maldives and ދިވެހިރާއްޖޭ ; value (English and Dhivehi)	Malé minaret; year of issue (Gregorian and Hijri)	1984–1996
	25 laari	20.19	3.75	Brass-plated steel	Reeded	Lettering: Maldives and ދިވެހިރާއްޖޭ ; value (English and Dhivehi)	Malé minaret; year of issue (Gregorian and Hijri)	2008
	50 laari	23.60	5.65	Nickel brass	Reeded	Lettering: Maldives and ދިވެހިރާއްޖޭ ; value (English and Dhivehi)	Loggerhead sea turtle; year of issue (Gregorian and Hijri)	1984–1995
	50 laari	23.60	5.15	Brass-plated steel	Reeded	Lettering: Maldives and ދިވެހިރާއްޖޭ ; value (English and Dhivehi)	Loggerhead sea turtle; year of issue (Gregorian and Hijri)	2008
	1 rufiyaa	25.91	6.41	Nickel-plated steel	Reeded	Lettering: Republic of Maldives; value (English and Dhivehi)	Coat of arms; year of issue (Gregorian and Hijri)	1982
	2 rufiyaa	25.50	11.70	Nickel brass	Reeded with lettering: REPUBLIC OF MALDIVES	Lettering: Republic of Maldives; value (English and Dhivehi)	Conch shell; Lettering: ދިވެހިރާއްޖ ; year of issue (Gregorian and Hijri)	1995–2007
	2 rufiyaa	25.50	11.70	Brass-plated steel	Reeded with lettering: REPUBLIC OF MALDIVES	Lettering: Republic of Maldives; value (English and Dhivehi)	Conch shell; Lettering: ދިވެހިރާއްޖ ; year of issue (Gregorian and Hijri)	2007
	2 rufiyaa	25.50	6.20	Outer: Nickel brass	Plain	Lettering: Republic of Maldives; value (English and Dhivehi)	Conch shell; Lettering: ދިވެހިރާއްޖ ; year of issue (Gregorian and Hijri)	2017
	2 rufiyaa	25.50	6.20	Inner: Nickel-plated steel	Plain	Lettering: Republic of Maldives; value (English and Dhivehi)	Conch shell; Lettering: ދިވެހިރާއްޖ ; year of issue (Gregorian and Hijri)	2017

== Gallery ==
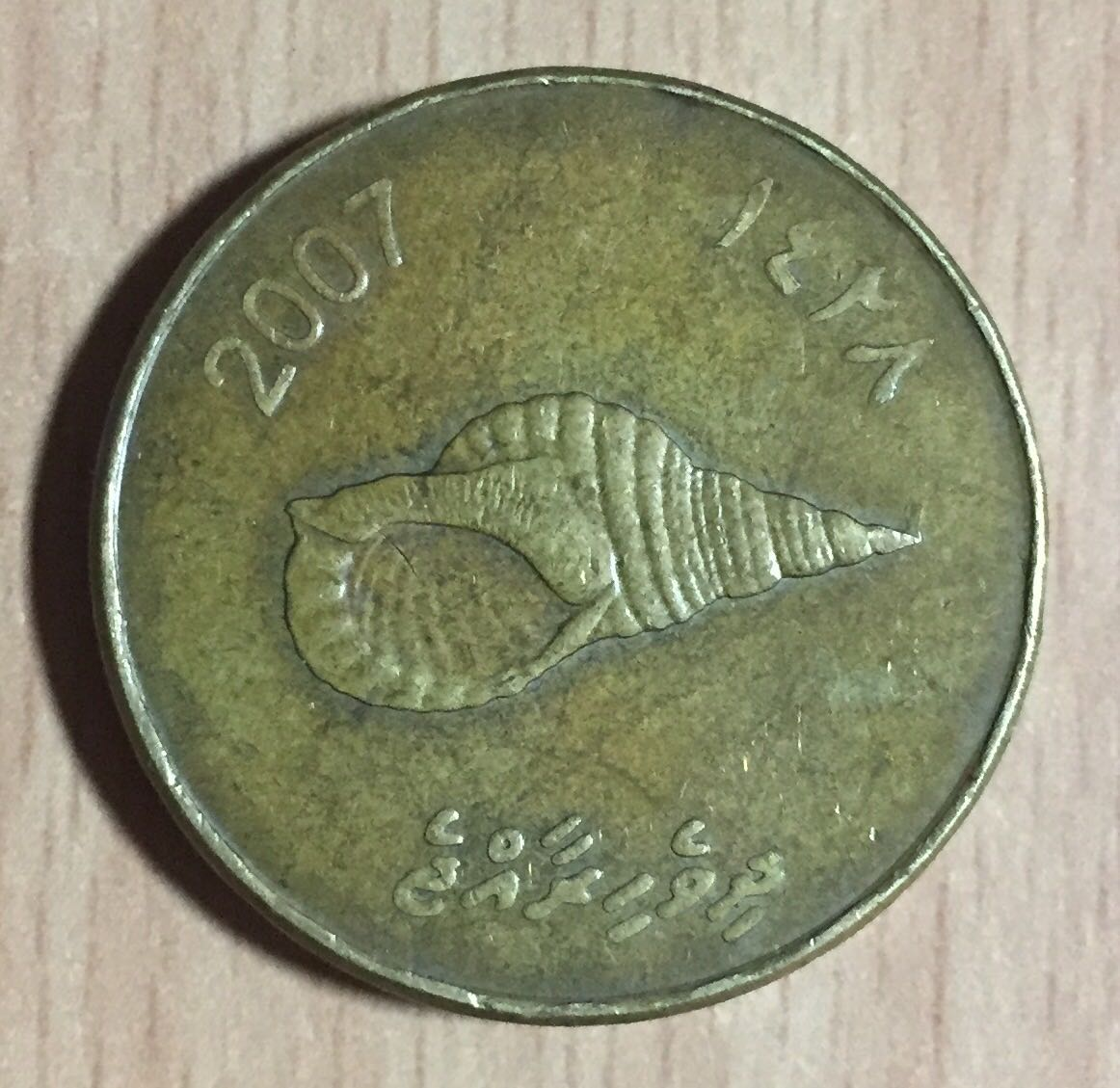
2 Rufiyaa obverse

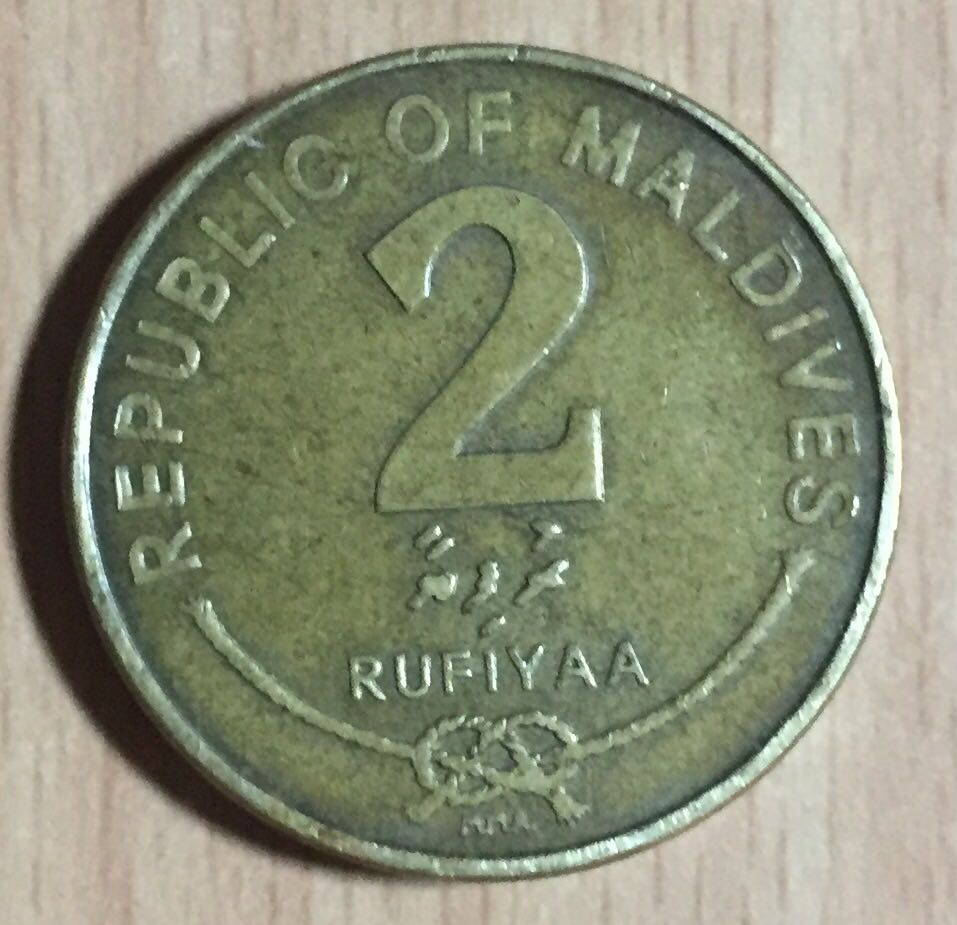
2 Rufiyaa reverse

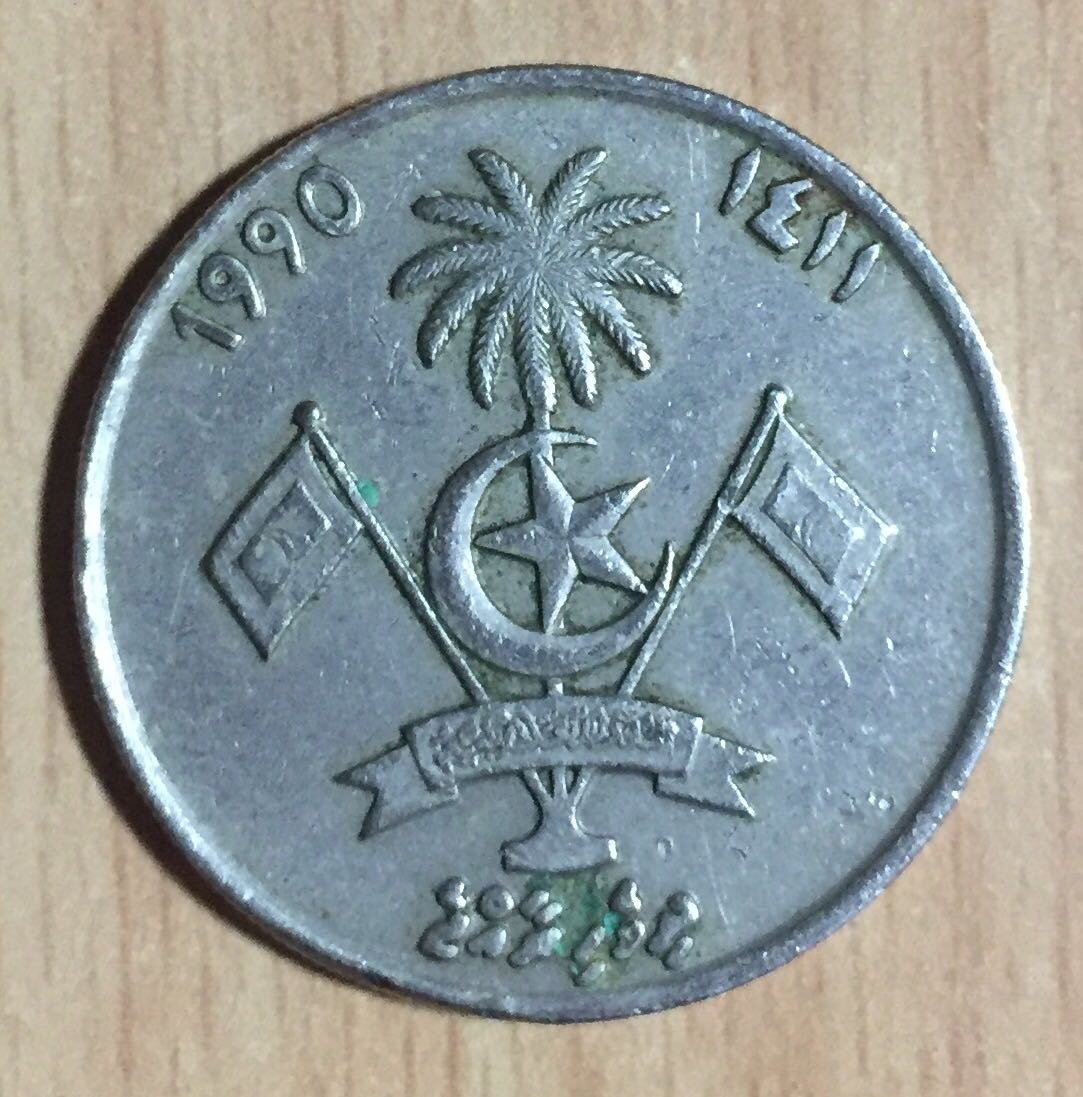
1 Rufiyaa obverse

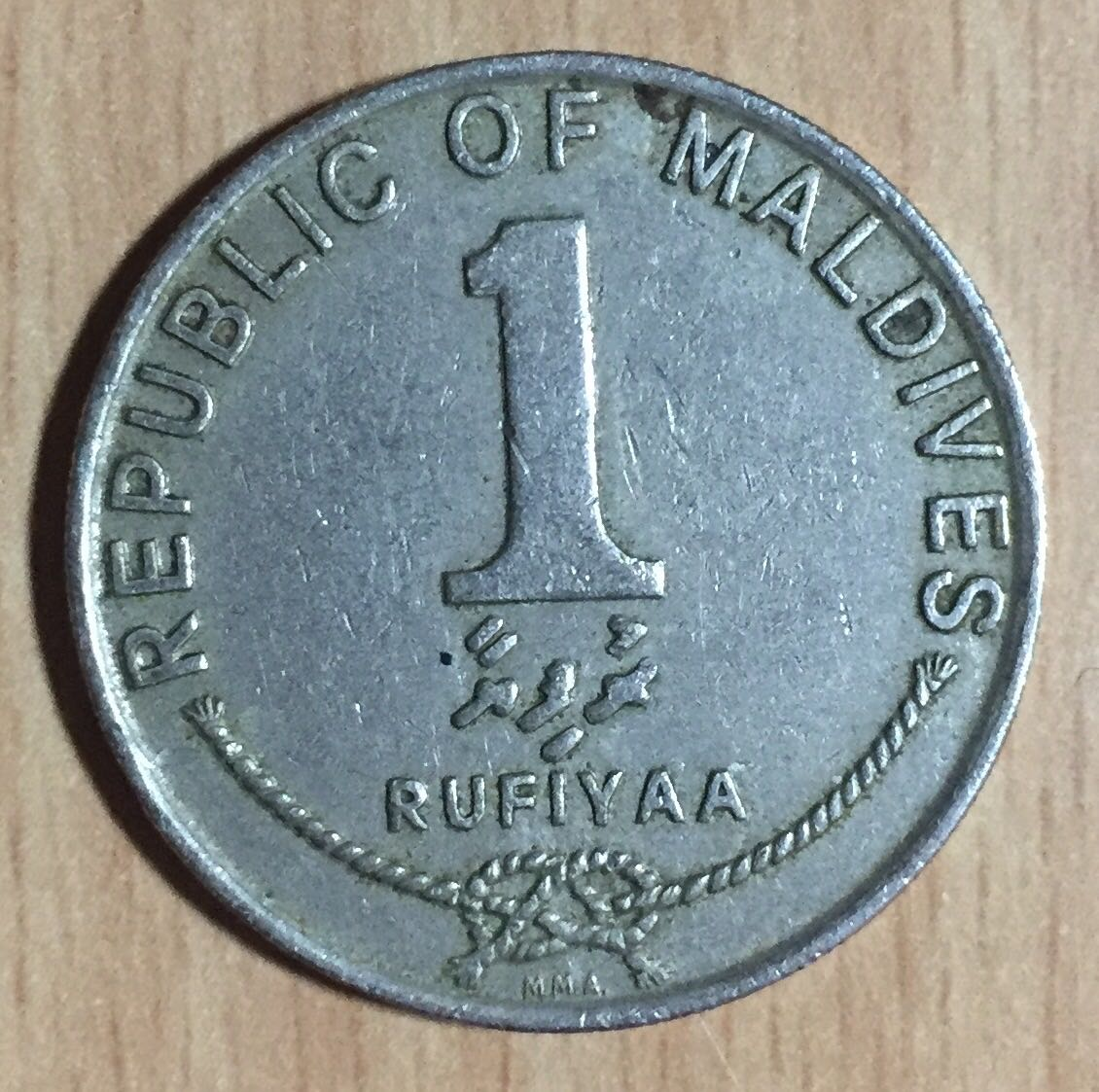
1 Rufiyaa reverse

== See also ==
- Maldivian rufiyaa
- Maldivian laari
- Currency of Maldives
