= Lari (surname) =

Lari is a surname. Notable people with the surname include:

- Abd al-Husayn Najafi Lari (1226–1303), Persian clergyman
- Mulla Muhammad Lari, Iranian-born general in the Sultanate of Bijapur
- Abdolvahed Mousavi Lari (born 1954), Iranian Shia cleric and reformist politician
- Abdul Rauf Lari, Indian independence activist and politician
- Adil Lari, Austrian architect
- Ahmed Lari (born 1955), Kuwaiti politician
- Alessandra Lari (born 1985), Italian racing cyclist
- Antonio Maria Lari, Italian architect and painter of the 16th century
- Dario Lari (born 1979), Italian rower
- Egidio Lari (1882–1965), Italian Catholic prelate
- Emilio Lari (born 1939), Italian photographer
- Esfandiar Lari (born 1939), Iranian sports shooter
- Farinaz Lari (born 1987), Iranian kickboxer
- Ghazala Lari, Indian politician
- Leonida Lari (1949–2011), Romanian poet, journalist and politician
- Marghoob Ahmad Lari (1947-2020), Indian politician
- Mosleh al-Din Lari (1510–1572), Persian scholar and historian
- Muhyi al-Din Lari, Persian 16th-century miniaturist and writer
- Mujtaba Musavi Lari (1925–2013), Iranian Islamic scholar
- Muzaffar Ahmad Lari, Urdu writer
- Nurul Ain Lari (1932–2011), Urdu writer, poet and educationist
- Ovidio Lari (1919–2007), Italian Catholic ordinary and bishop
- Stefano Lari (born 1961), Italian rower
- Suhail Zaheer Lari (1936–2020), Pakistani historian and author
- Yasmeen Lari (born c. 1941), Pakistan's first female architect
- Zafrul Ahsan Lari (1909–1975), Pakistani civil servant
- Zahirul Hasnain Lari (1907–1972), Pakistani politician
- Zahra Lari (born 1995), Emirati figure skater

== See also ==
- Lari (given name)
- Lari (disambiguation)
