= Laree =

Laree may refer to:

- Larée, a village and commune in France
- Lari (fish hook money), an obsolete coinage used around the Arabian sea
- Georgian lari, a unit of currency
- Maldivian laari, a unit of currency

== See also ==
- Lari (disambiguation)
