= Maldivian rufiyaa =

Currency of the Maldives

ދިވެހި ރުފިޔާ (Dhivehi) Rf
- 1 rufiyaa coin

ISO 4217
- Code: MVR (numeric: 462) before 1990: MVQ
- Subunit: 0.01

Units of account
- Symbol: ⃂
- Subunit
- 1/100: laari

Denominations
- Banknotes
- Freq. used: Rf. 5, Rf. 10, Rf. 20, Rf. 50, Rf. 100, Rf. 500
- Rarely used: Rf. 1,000, Rf. 5,000
- Coins
- Freq. used: 50 laari, Rf. 1, Rf. 2
- Rarely used: 1, 5, 10, 25 laari

Demographics
- User(s): Maldives

Issuance
- Central bank: Maldives Monetary Authority
- Website: www.mma.gov.mv
- Printer: De La Rue PLC
- Website: www.delarue.com
- Mint: Ministry of Finance
- Website: www.finance.gov.mv

Valuation
- Inflation: 2.8%
- Source: The World Factbook, 2017 est.

The Maldivian rufiyaa (Dhivehi: ދިވެހި ރުފިޔާ, romanized: dhivehi rufiyaa; sign:; code: MVR, abbreviation Rf) is the currency of the Maldives. The issuance of the currency is controlled by the Maldives Monetary Authority (MMA). The rufiyaa is subdivided into 100 laari.

The name rufiyaa is derived from the Sanskrit रूप्य (rūpya, lit. 'wrought silver'). The midpoint of exchange rate is Rf. 12.85 per US dollar and the rate is permitted to fluctuate within a ±20% band, i.e. between Rf. 10.28 and Rf. 15.42 as of 10 April 2017.

== History ==
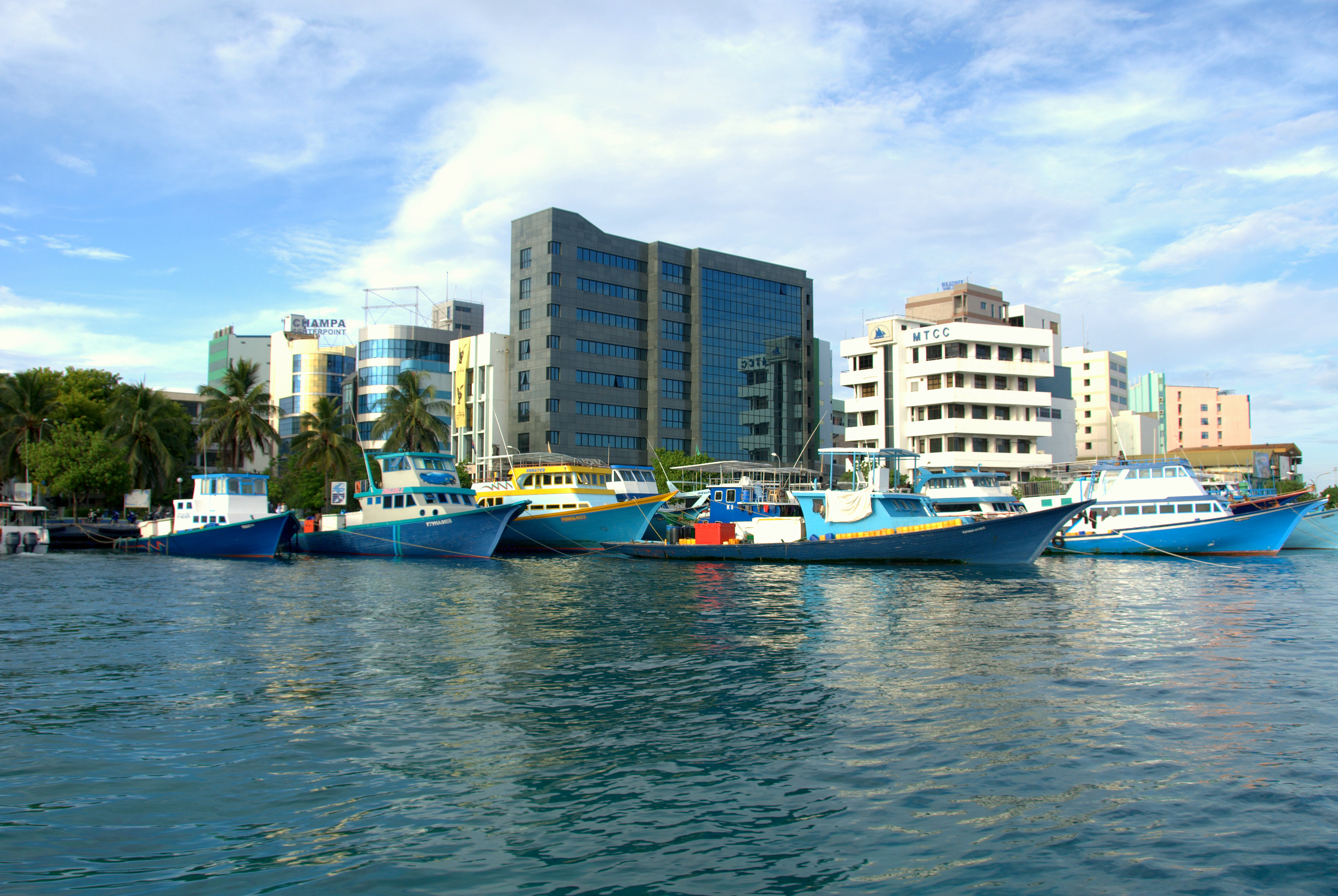
The modern building of the Maldives Monetary Authority

The earliest form of currency used in the Maldives was cowrie shells (Cypraea moneta) and historical accounts of travellers indicate that they were traded in this manner even during the 13th century. As late as 1344, Ibn Battuta observed that more than 40 ships loaded with cowry shells were exported each year. A single gold dinar was worth 400,000 shells.

During the 17th and 18th centuries, lārin (parallel straps of silver wire folded in half with dyed Persian and Arabic inscriptions) were imported and traded as currency. This form of currency was used in the Persian Gulf, India, Ceylon and the Far East during this time. Historians agree that this new form of currency was most probably exchanged for cowry shells and indicates Maldives' lucrative trade with these countries. The first Sultan to imprint his own seal onto this currency was Ghaazee Muhammad Thakurufaanu al-Auzam. The seal was much broader than the wires hence it was barely legible.

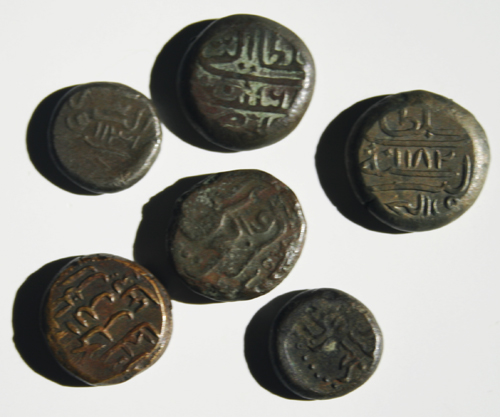
Maldivian coins from the 17th and 18th century.

The first known of coins were introduced by Sultan Ibrahim Iskandar (1648–1687). Compared to the previous forms of money, these coins were much neater and minted in pure silver. The coins were minted in the capital city of Malé, a fact which it acknowledged on the reverse. The legend "King of Land and Sea, Iskandhar the Great" (Dhivehi: ކަނޑާއި އެއްގަމުގެ ރަސްގެފާނު، މަތިވެރި އިސްކަންދަރު) is found on the edge.

After this period, gold coins replaced the existing silver ones during the reign of Sultan Hassan Nooruddin in 1787. He used two different qualities of gold in his coins; one was called Mohoree and the other Baimohoree, of which the former is of higher value. How this gold was obtained is uncertain.

Throughout the nineteenth and early twentieth centuries, bronze coins were issued denominated in laari. Sultan Mohamed Imaadhudheen IV (1900–1904) introduced what historians believe to be the first machine struck coins, judging the superior quality of the engravements. His successor Sultan Mohamed Shamshudeen III (1904–1935) made the last of these coins, 1 and 4 laari denominations, which were struck in the United Kingdom by Heaton's Mint, Birmingham, England in 1913.

Following the end of coin production specifically for the Maldives, the Sultanate came to use the Ceylonese rupee. This was supplemented in 1947 by issues of banknotes denominated in rufiyaa, equal in value to the rupee. In 1960, coins denominated in laari, now worth one hundredth of the rufiyaa, were introduced.

In 1990, the ISO 4217 code was changed from MVQ (Maldive rupee) into MVR (rufiyaa).

== Coins ==
In early 1960, Sultan Mohamed Fareed I ordered coins from the Royal Mint in England. The new issue consisted of denominations of 1, 2, 5, 10, 25 and 50 laari. Unlike his predecessors, Sultan Fareed did not embellish his title on the coins; instead he used the National Emblem on the reverse side with the traditional title of the state (Arabic: الدولة المحلديبية, State of Maldives) and the denomination value on the obverse side. The currency was put into circulation in February 1961 and all the previously traded coins, with the exception of Shamshudeen III's 1 and 4 laari, were withdrawn from circulation on 17 June 1966.

The newly established central bank, the Maldives Monetary Authority (MMA), introduced the Rf. 1 coin on 22 January 1983. The coin was minted in West Germany. In 1984, a new series of coins was introduced which did not include the 2 laari denomination. In 1995, Rf. 2 coins were introduced. Coins currently in circulation are 1 laari, 2 laari, 5 laari, 10 laari, 25 laari, 50 laari, Rf. 1, Rf. 2. In 2017, a bimetallic Rf. 2 coin was introduced into circulation to replace the previous RF. 2 coin.

Second series (1982–2017)
Image	Value	Diameter (mm)	Mass (g)	Composition	Edge	Obverse	Reverse	Issue
	1 laari	15.00	0.456	Aluminum	Smooth	Lettering: Maldives and ދިވެހިރާއްޖޭ ; value (English and Dhivehi)	Coconut palm; year of issue (Gregorian and Hijri)	1984
	5 laari	20.32 (scalloped)	2.00	Aluminum	Smooth	Lettering: Maldives and ދިވެހިރާއްޖޭ ; value (English and Dhivehi)	Tuna; year of issue (Gregorian and Hijri)	1984–1990
	5 laari	16.85	0.62	Aluminum	Reeded	Lettering: Maldives and ދިވެހިރާއްޖޭ ; value (English and Dhivehi)	Tuna; year of issue (Gregorian and Hijri)	2012
	10 laari	23.11 (scalloped)	1.95	Aluminum	Smooth	Lettering: Maldives and ދިވެހިރާއްޖޭ ; value (English and Dhivehi)	Odi; year of issue (Gregorian and Hijri)	1984–2001
	10 laari	18.10	0.85	Aluminum	Smooth	Lettering: Maldives and ދިވެހިރާއްޖޭ ; value (English and Dhivehi)	Odi; year of issue (Gregorian and Hijri)	2012
	25 laari	20.19	4.15	Nickel brass	Reeded	Lettering: Maldives and ދިވެހިރާއްޖޭ ; value (English and Dhivehi)	Malé minaret; year of issue (Gregorian and Hijri)	1984–1996
	25 laari	20.19	3.75	Brass-plated steel	Reeded	Lettering: Maldives and ދިވެހިރާއްޖޭ ; value (English and Dhivehi)	Malé minaret; year of issue (Gregorian and Hijri)	2008
	50 laari	23.60	5.65	Nickel brass	Reeded	Lettering: Maldives and ދިވެހިރާއްޖޭ ; value (English and Dhivehi)	Loggerhead sea turtle; year of issue (Gregorian and Hijri)	1984–1995
	50 laari	23.60	5.15	Brass-plated steel	Reeded	Lettering: Maldives and ދިވެހިރާއްޖޭ ; value (English and Dhivehi)	Loggerhead sea turtle; year of issue (Gregorian and Hijri)	2008
	1 rufiyaa	25.91	6.41	Nickel-plated steel	Reeded	Lettering: Republic of Maldives; value (English and Dhivehi)	Coat of arms; year of issue (Gregorian and Hijri)	1982
	2 rufiyaa	25.50	11.70	Nickel brass	Reeded with lettering: REPUBLIC OF MALDIVES	Lettering: Republic of Maldives; value (English and Dhivehi)	Conch shell; Lettering: ދިވެހިރާއްޖ ; year of issue (Gregorian and Hijri)	1995–2007
	2 rufiyaa	25.50	11.70	Brass-plated steel	Reeded with lettering: REPUBLIC OF MALDIVES	Lettering: Republic of Maldives; value (English and Dhivehi)	Conch shell; Lettering: ދިވެހިރާއްޖ ; year of issue (Gregorian and Hijri)	2007
	2 rufiyaa	25.50	6.20	Outer: Nickel brass	Plain	Lettering: Republic of Maldives; value (English and Dhivehi)	Conch shell; Lettering: ދިވެހިރާއްޖ ; year of issue (Gregorian and Hijri)	2017
	2 rufiyaa	25.50	6.20	Inner: Nickel-plated steel	Plain	Lettering: Republic of Maldives; value (English and Dhivehi)	Conch shell; Lettering: ދިވެހިރާއްޖ ; year of issue (Gregorian and Hijri)	2017

== Banknotes ==
In 1945, the Majlis of the Maldives (Parliament) passed bill number 2/66 on the "Maldivian Bank Note". Under this law, banknotes for Rf. 1/2, Rf. 1, Rf. 2, Rf. 5 and Rf. 10 were printed and put into circulation on 5 September 1948. In 1951, Rf. 50 and Rf. 100 banknotes were introduced.

The previous series of banknotes were issued in 1983 in denominations of Rf. 2, Rf. 5, Rf. 10, Rf. 20, Rf. 50 and Rf. 100. Rf. 500 banknotes were added in 1990, with the Rf. 2 replaced by a coin in 1995.

In October 2015, the Maldives Monetary Authority issued a Rf. 5,000 banknote in polymer to commemorate the 50th anniversary of independence, and issued a new family of banknotes in polymer that included a new denomination of Rf. 1,000. A Rf. 5 banknote printed in polymer was revealed in May 2017 and was issued in July 2017. It was originally planned that this denomination was to be replaced by a coin of the same denomination, but public input convinced the Maldives Monetary Authority to go for the banknote.

Illustrations on the banknotes were done by Maizan Hassan Manik and Abbaas (Bamboo).

=== First series ===
First series (1947)
Image	Value	Dimensions (mm)	Description		Issue	Withdrawn
Image	Value	Dimensions (mm)	Obverse	Reverse	Issue	Withdrawn
	Rf. 1/2	109 × 57	Palm tree and lateen rigged Mas dhoani; Mas odi, a square rigged vessel	—N/a	5 September 1948	1983
	Rf. 1	115 × 64	Palm tree and lateen rigged Mas dhoani; Mas odi, a square rigged vessel	Customs House building	5 September 1948	1983
	Rf. 2	127 × 76	Palm tree and lateen rigged Mas dhoani; Mas odi, a square rigged vessel	Royal Jetty	5 September 1948	1983
	Rf. 5	140 × 88	Palm tree and lateen rigged Mas dhoani; Mas odi, a square rigged vessel	Sakkarannya Gate	5 September 1948	1983
	Rf. 10	156 × 103	Palm tree and lateen rigged Mas dhoani; Mas odi, a square rigged vessel	Veyodorhu Ganduvaru Mathige; Medhumaa Gate	5 September 1948	1983
	Rf. 50	159 × 107	Palm tree and lateen rigged Mas dhoani; Mas odi, a square rigged vessel	Ibrahimiyya Building; Dhathurah Araavadaigannavaa Gate	8 May 1951	1983
	Rf. 100	166 × 118	Palm tree and lateen rigged Mas dhoani; Mas odi, a square rigged vessel	Court of Eterekoilu	8 May 1951	1983

=== Second series ===
Second series (1983)
Image	Value	Dimensions (mm)	Main colour	Description		Issue	Withdrawn	Lapse
Image	Value	Dimensions (mm)	Main colour	Obverse	Reverse	Issue	Withdrawn	Lapse
	Rf. 2	150 × 70	Olive green	Dhivehi Odi ship; coconuts	Beaches	1983, 1990	1 August 2016	31 December 2021
	Rf. 5	150 × 70	Violet	Dhivehi Odi ship; coconuts	Fishing boats	1983, 1990	1 January 2018	31 December 2021
	Rf. 5	150 × 70	Violet	Dhivehi Odi ship; coconuts	Fishing boats	1998, 2000, 2006, 2011	1 January 2018	31 December 2021
	Rf. 10	150 × 70	Brown	Dhivehi Odi ship; coconuts	Island village	1983	1 August 2016	31 December 2021
	Rf. 10	150 × 70	Brown	Dhivehi Odi ship; coconuts	Island village	1998, 2006	1 August 2016	31 December 2021
	Rf. 20	150 × 70	Pink	Dhivehi Odi ship; coconuts	Malé inner harbour	1983, 1987	1 August 2016	31 December 2021
	Rf. 20	150 × 70	Pink	Dhivehi Odi ship; coconuts	Malé inner harbour	2000, 2008	1 August 2016	31 December 2021
	Rf. 50	150 × 70	Blue	Dhivehi Odi ship; coconuts	Bazar in Malé	1983, 1987	1 August 2016	31 December 2021
	Rf. 50	150 × 70	Blue	Dhivehi Odi ship; coconuts	Bazar in Malé	2000, 2008	1 August 2016	31 December 2021
	Rf. 100	150 × 70	Green	Dhivehi Odi ship; coconuts	Medhu Ziyaaraiy	1983, 1987	1 August 2016	31 December 2021
	Rf. 100	150 × 70	Green	Dhivehi Odi ship; coconuts	Medhu Ziyaaraiy	1995, 2000, 2013	1 August 2016	31 December 2021
	Rf. 500	150 × 70	Red	Dhivehi Odi ship; coconuts	Islamic Centre and Mosque	1990, 1996	11 May 2007	8 November 2007
	Rf. 500	150 × 70	Red	Dhivehi Odi ship; coconuts	Islamic Centre and Mosque	2006, 2008	1 August 2016	31 December 2021

=== Current series ===
Ran Dhihafaheh series (2015)
Image	Value	Dimensions (mm)	Main colour	Description		Issue
Image	Value	Dimensions (mm)	Main colour	Obverse	Reverse	Issue
	Rf. 5	150 × 70	Grey	Football players; people celebrating	Conch shell	2017
	Rf. 10	150 × 70	Yellow	Toddy tapper; people playing boduberu	Boduberu	2015, 2018
	Rf. 20	150 × 70	Purple	Fisherman with skipjack tuna; Velana International Airport	Dhoni	2015, 2020
	Rf. 50	150 × 70	Green	A boy reciting the Quran; Men pulling boats	Friday Mosque minaret	2015, 2022
	Rf. 100	150 × 70	Red	Woman wearing libaas (dress); neckline threading work (Hiru)	Lōmāfānu (early Dhivehi scripture)	2015, 2018, 2024
	Rf. 500	150 × 70	Orange	Wood carving; a woman making ekels (Iloshi)	Naalhi (traditional hand carved vase)	2015
	Rf. 1000	150 × 70	Blue	Green turtle; Manta rays	Whale shark	2015

== Symbol ==
The rufiyaa symbol is created by introducing an additional horizontal stroke to Thaana letter raa.

The rufiyaa symbol was publicly introduced by the MMA on 3 July 2022. Designed by Hassan Shujau, it is based on the Thaana letter raa (U+0783 ރ THAANA LETTER RAA), which is the first letter in spelling "rufiyaa" in Dhivehi, with an added parallel line is to represent the equal sign as used in various other currency symbols.

The design was chosen among 70 concept proposals received through a nationwide competition. The proposals were evaluated by an evaluation committee comprising members from the MMA, Dhivehi Bahuge Academy and other areas of expertise.

The symbol was allocated the codepoint U+20C2 ⃂ RUFIYAA SIGN in Unicode version 18.0 (September 2026). Integration into the operating systems of computers and smartphones will follow within a few years and be released to user equipments that are still eligible to receive updates.

== See also ==
- Currency of Maldives
- Economy of Maldives
