= Lurs (disambiguation) =

Lurs can refer to:

- Lur, a long musical wind instrument without finger holes
- Lur, an Etruscan deity
- Lurs, an Iranian ethnic group
- Lurs, Alpes-de-Haute-Provence, a commune of Alpes-de-Haute-Provence, France

== See also ==
- Luri (disambiguation)
- Lari (disambiguation)
