= Laari =

Laari may refer to:

- Maldivian laari, a coin denomination issued by the Maldives
- Lari people (Congo), an ethnic group of the Republic of the Congo
- Laari language, a Bantu language
- Sanna Laari, Finnish biathlete
- Ilkka-Eemeli Laari, Finnish snowboarder

== See also ==
- Lari (disambiguation)
