= Lari (given name) =

Lari is a given name. Notable people with the name include:

- Lari Azad (born 1959), Indian historian
- Lari Ketner (1977–2014), American basketball player
- Lari Lehtonen (born 1987), Finnish cross-country skier
- Lari Pesonen (born 1995), Finnish sport shooter
- Lari Pittman (born 1952), Colombian-American artist and professor
- Lari White (1965–2018), American country music singer
- Lari Williams (1940–2022), Nigerian actor, poet, and playwright

== See also ==
- Lari (surname)
- Lari (disambiguation)
- Larry, given name
- Larri, given name and surname
