= Lari language =

Lari may refer to:

- Lari language (Iran), or Achomi, a language of Iran
- Lari dialect (Sindhi), a dialect of the Sindhi language of Pakistan
- Lari language (Congo), a variety of the Kongo language of Congo

== See also ==
- Lari people (disambiguation)
- Lari (disambiguation)
- Luri (disambiguation)
- Laarim language, South Sudan
