= Lari =

Lari may refer to:

== Currency ==
- Georgian lari, the currency of Georgia
- Maldivian laari, or lari, a coin denomination of the rufiyaa of the Maldives
- Lari (singular: larin), coins used around the Persian Gulf and Arabian Sea

== Places ==
- Lari, Ardabil, or Lahrud, a city in Iran
- Lari, East Azerbaijan, a village in Iran
- Lari, Tuscany, a hamlet in Italy
- Lari Constituency, an electoral constituency in Kenya
- Lari, an administrative division of the former Kiambu District, Kenya
- Lari River, Costa Rica

== Persons with the name ==
- Lari (surname)
- Lari (given name)

== Other uses ==
- Lari (bird), suborder of birds
- Lari language (disambiguation), several languages with the name
- Lari people (disambiguation)
- Iraqi Biradari or Lari, Muslim community of India

== See also ==
- Larri, a name
- Laari (disambiguation)
- Larry (disambiguation)
- Lare (disambiguation)
- Laree (disambiguation)
- Lar (disambiguation)
- Luri (disambiguation)
- Lares (disambiguation)
