= Battle of Bhatvadi =

Battle fought in 1624

- Part of Mughal invasion of Deccan
Date	September 1624
Location	Bhatvadi 19.045731°N 74.899063°E
Result	Ahmadnagar victory

Belligerents
Ahmadnagar Sultanate	Bijapur Sultanate; Mughal Empire; Golconda Sultanate

Commanders and leaders
Malik Ambar; Shahaji; Sarfoji †	Mullah Muhammad Lari †; Ikhlas Khan (POW); Lashkar Khan (POW); Farhad Khan (executed); Randaula Khan (WIA); Lakhuji Jadhav
- Location of Bhatvadi in India Bhatvadi (Maharashtra)

The Battle of Bhatvadi (also Bhatavadi or Bhatwadi) was fought in 1624, near modern Bhatodi Pargaon village in Maharashtra, India. The Ahmadnagar army led by Malik Ambar defeated a combined Mughal-Bijapur force led by the Bijapuri general Mullah Muhammad Lari.

Malik Ambar's army was being pursued by the allied forces, when he took shelter at a fortified complex near Bhatvadi. He then breached a dam to cause flooding that prevented the allied cavalry from approaching his camp. Meanwhile, disagreements between various generals and heavy rains added to the chaos in the Mughal-Bijapur camp. Taking advantage of this situation, Malik Ambar attacked the allied camp, and achieved a decisive victory, imprisoning several Bijapuri and Mughal generals. Muhammad Lari was killed, possibly on the orders of the rival Bijapuri general Ikhlas Khan.

The generals of the Ahmadnagar army included Shahaji, whose son Shivaji subsequently established a kingdom that evolved into the Maratha Empire. The Maratha records portray the battle of Bhatvadi as an auspicious omen signaling the rise of the Maratha power.

== Background ==
The Ahmadnagar Sultanate was a major kingdom in the Deccan region of India; it was officially ruled by the Nizam Shahi dynasty, but its de facto ruler was the powerful minister Malik Ambar. Ahmadnagar was involved in conflicts against its northern neighbour, the Mughal Empire, its southern neighbour, the Bijapur Sultanate, ruled by the Adil Shahi dynasty, and its eastern neighbour, the Golconda Sultanate. A peace treaty between the Mughals and Bijapur led to their alliance against Ahmadnagar. Malik Ambar could not match the military superiority of the Bijapur-Mughal forces, and relied on guerilla tactics.

Shahaji and other local Maratha chiefs frequently changed their allegiance between the warring sides. Sometime before the battle of Bhatvadi, Shahaji and some other Maratha leaders joined the Mughals, but returned to Malik Ambar's service just before the battle. The Maratha officers who fought on Malik Ambar's side at Bhatvadi included Shahaji, Sharofji, Maloji, Parsoji, Mambaji, Nagoji, Trimbakji, Kakoji, Hambir Rao Chavan, Madhji, Nar Singh Raj, Ballela Tripul, Vithal Raj Kavata, Dattaji, Naganath, Nar Singh Pingle, and Sunder Jagdev.

By 1624, the Mughals had captured the Ahmadnagar city, and Malik Ambar controlled the rural areas to the east of the city. After a series of conflicts and negotiations, Malik Ambar invaded the Bijapur Sultanate, and besieged its capital, the Bijapur city. The Bijapuri king Ibrahim Adil Shah II asked his general Mullah Muhammad Lari to come to Bijapur, and also secured support of the Mughal viceroy Sarbuland Rai by offering 200,000 huns to him. Meanwhile, an epidemic killed 500 horses in Malik Ambar's camp in a single night. He attempted to convince the Mughals to stay away from the conflict and tried to negotiate a peace treaty with Bijapur, but was unsuccessful. The impending arrival of a combined Bijapur-Mughal army forced him to retreat from Bijapur.

Adil Shah sent an army led by Ikhlas Khan Habshi to pursue Malik Ambar's retreating army, and shortly after, sent a larger army comprising Mughal and Bijapur troops commanded by Muhammad Lari.

== The battle delayed ==
Malik Ambar retreated to his own territory, and encamped at a place described as the "fort of Bhatavdi" by the near-contemporary text Futuhat-i-Adilshahi. This place was probably a large fortified complex located in present-day Beed district, near the Bhatvadi village (modern Bhatodi Pargaon) in present-day Ahmednagar district, south-east of the Ahmadnagar city. The Bijapur-Mughal army encamped nearby, with the Keli River (or Kalinadi) separating the two camps.

The Ahmadnagar minister Salabat Khan had constructed a dam on the Keli River in 1589. The records of the colonial British government, which repaired this dam in the mid-19th century, suggest that it could store at least 4.22 million cubic meters of water. The battle was fought during the monsoon season in September 1624, when the water level in the dam would have been very high. (Note: According to the Jedhe Shakavali, the battle was fought in October 1624. Basatin-us-Salatin variously dates it to the Hijri years 1033 and 1034; the change from Hijri year 1033 to 1034 happened on 6–7 October 1624 CE. These sources suggest the battle was fought in October 1624. However, based on circumstantial evidence, scholar B. G. Tamaskar theorizes that the battle was fought in September 1624. Art and architectural historian Pushkar Sohoni finds Tamaskar's theory "quite convincing".)

Malik Ambar ordered the dam to breached, and the subsequent flooding prevented the Bijapur-Mughal cavalry from advancing towards his camp. The allied effort was further hindered by heavy rain and quarrels between the Mughal and the Bijapuri commanders. Adil Shah had sent special robes to honour to his general Ikhlas Khan and a few other Bijapuri nobles, but refused to similarly honour the Mughal generals of the joint army, despite requests from Muhammad Lari to do so. This behaviour of Adil Shah had alienated the Mughal troops.

For nearly two months, neither side advanced towards the enemy camp. Sijahdar Khan, the commander of the Mughal troops, recommended that the Bijapur-Mughal force leave Bhatvadi and retreat to the Mughal-controlled Ahmadnagar city. The Bijapuri general Ikhlas Khan favoured a negotiation with Malik Ambar before retreating to the Bijapur city. However, his colleague Muhammad Lari refused to leave without engaging in a battle with Malik Ambar. The disagreement led to a verbal argument between the two generals, with Ikhlas Khan blaming Muhammad Lari for the misfortunes of the Bijapur-Mughal force.

== The battle ==
Amid the chaos in the Bijapur-Mughal camp, Malik Ambar launched an attack, starting a battle at Bhatvadi. The Bijapuri general Muhammad Lari was killed when a ball hit him and he fell down from his horse. According to Futuhat-i-Adilshahi, he was killed by the Bijapuri soldiers by the order of Ikhlas Khan. But many historians refuse this. According to 'Shivbharat' Muhammad Lari was killed by Shahaji Bhosale a brave warrior in Ahmednagar Sultanate.

Meanwhile, Malik Ambar's cavalry feigned retreat, but then launched a surprise attack on the Bijapuri troops, bypassing the Mughal contingent. Malik Ambar's men captured Ikhlas Khan and 240 other commanders of Bijapur. They also captured three Mughal generals; the other Mughal generals fled the battlefield, riding towards the Mughal-controlled territory. The battle thus resulted in a huge victory for Ahmadnagar.

== Legacy ==
The battle was important enough to be recorded by the European traveler Pietro Della Valle, who heard about it in Goa on 31 October 1624. Malik Ambar died in 1626, and Ahmadnagar fell to its enemies a decade later, in 1636. In the subsequent decades, Shivaji - a son of Malik Ambar's subordinate Shahaji - established a kingdom that covered much of former Ahmadnagar territory, and that ultimately evolved into the Maratha Empire. The Maratha records portray the battle of Bhatvadi as an important turning point in the history of the region, and as an auspicious omen indicating the rise of the Marathas.

The Sanskrit-language texts Radha-madhava-vilasa-champuh (composed under Shahaji's patronage in 1654) and Shiva-bharata (composed under Shivaji's patronage in 1674) describe the battle of Bhatvadi. The Persian language texts Futuhat-i-Adilshahi (1640–43), Iqbalnamah-i-Jahangiri (17th century), and Basatin-us-Salatin (1824) also contain information about the battle. The event also finds a mention the Marathi language records, including the Jedhe Shakavali (17th century) and a Brihadisvara Temple inscription (1803).

== See also ==
- Battle of Salsu (612 CE), another battle won by breaching a dam
