= Larry Harris =

Larry Harris may refer to:

- Larry Harris (basketball), former general manager of the Milwaukee Bucks
- Larry Harris (computer scientist), American computer scientist and businessman
- Larry Harris (game designer), board game designer
- Larry Harris (record label executive), co-founder of Casablanca Records
