= Larri =

Larri is a given name and a surname. Notable people with the name include:

- Larri Laine, stage name of Corinne Cole (born 1937), American former Playmate and actress
- Larri Leeger (born 1986), Swiss-Finnish professional ice hockey player
- Larri Merritt (born 1998), American YouTuber known as Larray
- Larri Thomas (1932–2013), American actress and dancer
- Yan Larri (1900–1977), Soviet children's and utopian fiction writer

== Fictional characters ==
- Larri, character in the 2007 British horror film Dead Wood

== See also ==
- Larry
- Lari
