= Lari people =

Lari people may refer to:

- Lari people (Congo) (alternatively Laari), an ethnic group of the Republic of the Congo
- Lari people (Iran), (alternatively Laristani), an ethnic group of Iran

== See also ==
- Lari language (disambiguation)
- Lari (disambiguation)
