= Currency of Maldives =

The present currency of Maldives is the Maldivian rufiyaa, (introduced in 1947). The rufiyaa is divided into 100 laari. Over the centuries, the Maldives has had a variety of currencies and other mediums of exchange.

== History ==
=== Boli ===
Cowry shells (Cypraea moneta), or boli, were the first known medium of exchange used in the Maldives. Various writers and travellers have in the past recorded the country's trade in these money shells, which were used as a medium of exchange in parts of Asia and Africa. In the past, cowry were actually cultivated in the Maldives. When Moroccan traveller and historian Ibn Battuta visited this country, feojedfe Dutch in Ceylon, continued until the late 19th century, when it was used mostly as ballast for sailing vessels.

=== Dhigu laari ===
According to history, the first dhigu laari was struck in the Maldives, during the reign of Sultan Ibrahim III ibn Ghazi Muhammed (1585–1607), son of the hero Sultan Ghazi Muhammed Thakurufa'anu Akbar al-'Azam. Dhigu laari or larin, which owes its name to Lar, in the Persian Gulf, where it was originally struck, was one of the standard currencies of the Indian Ocean in the late 16th century. The dhigu laari is actually a long piece of silver, about three inches in length, doubled over and stamped with the name of the sultan, in Arabic.

=== Loa laari ===
Loa laari or laari fothi ("circular coin") was first struck by Sultan Ibrahim Iskandar I (1648–1687). The first coins were of silver and fairly coarse. Later, coins of copper and lead were put into circulation. Gold coins were also struck by Sultan Hassan Nooraddin (1779–1799). Said to be the finest struck at the Maldive mint, the two denominations of gold coins issued by Sultan Hassan Nooraddin, known as the mohori and bai mohori, were never put into circulation.

== Today ==
The Maldivian unit of currency is the rufiyaa (ISO 4217 code MVR, abbreviation Rf.), introduced in 1947. The rufiyaa is divided into 100 laari. On 1 February 2009, the exchange rate with the US dollar was US$1.00 = MVR12.80. On 10 April 2011, the Government announced a limited float of the currency within a band of 20% from the previous exchange rate of 12.80.

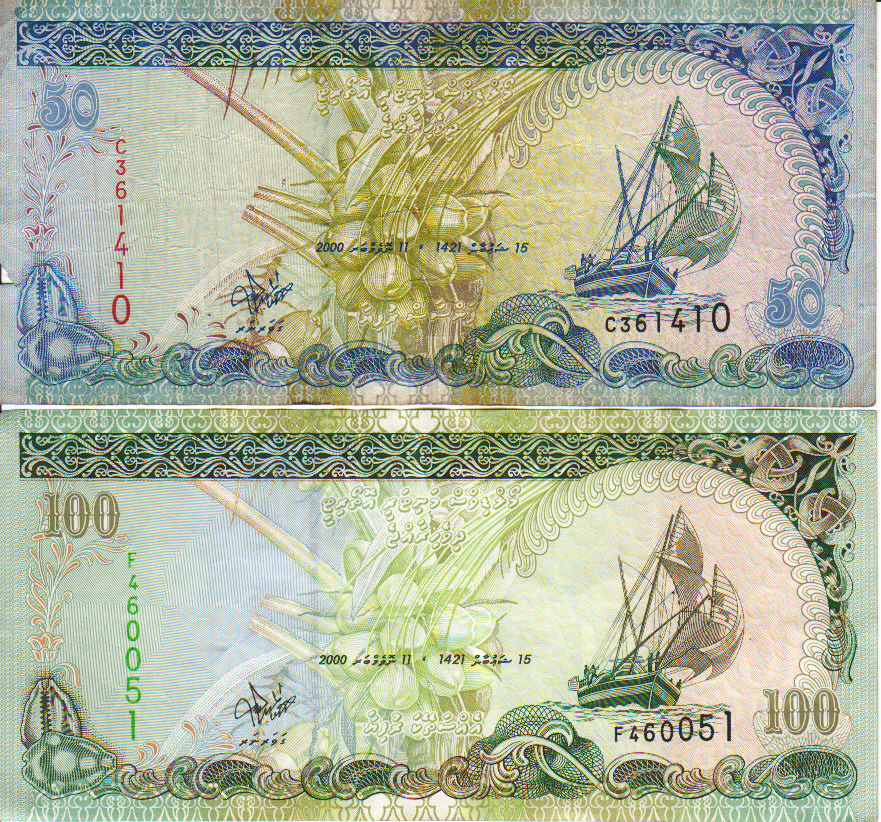
Maldives, banknotes, 50 and 100

=== Currency symbol ===
The rufiyaa symbol is created by introducing an additional horizontal stroke to Thaana letter raa.

On 3 July 2022, the MMA introduced a new currency symbol for the rufiyaa, based on the Thaana letter raa (U+0783 ރ THAANA LETTER RAA), which is the first letter in spelling "rufiyaa" in Dhivehi, with an added parallel line.

== Sources ==
- Browder, Tim J.: Maldive Islands Money, Santa Monica, 1969
