= Yan Larri =

Soviet writer

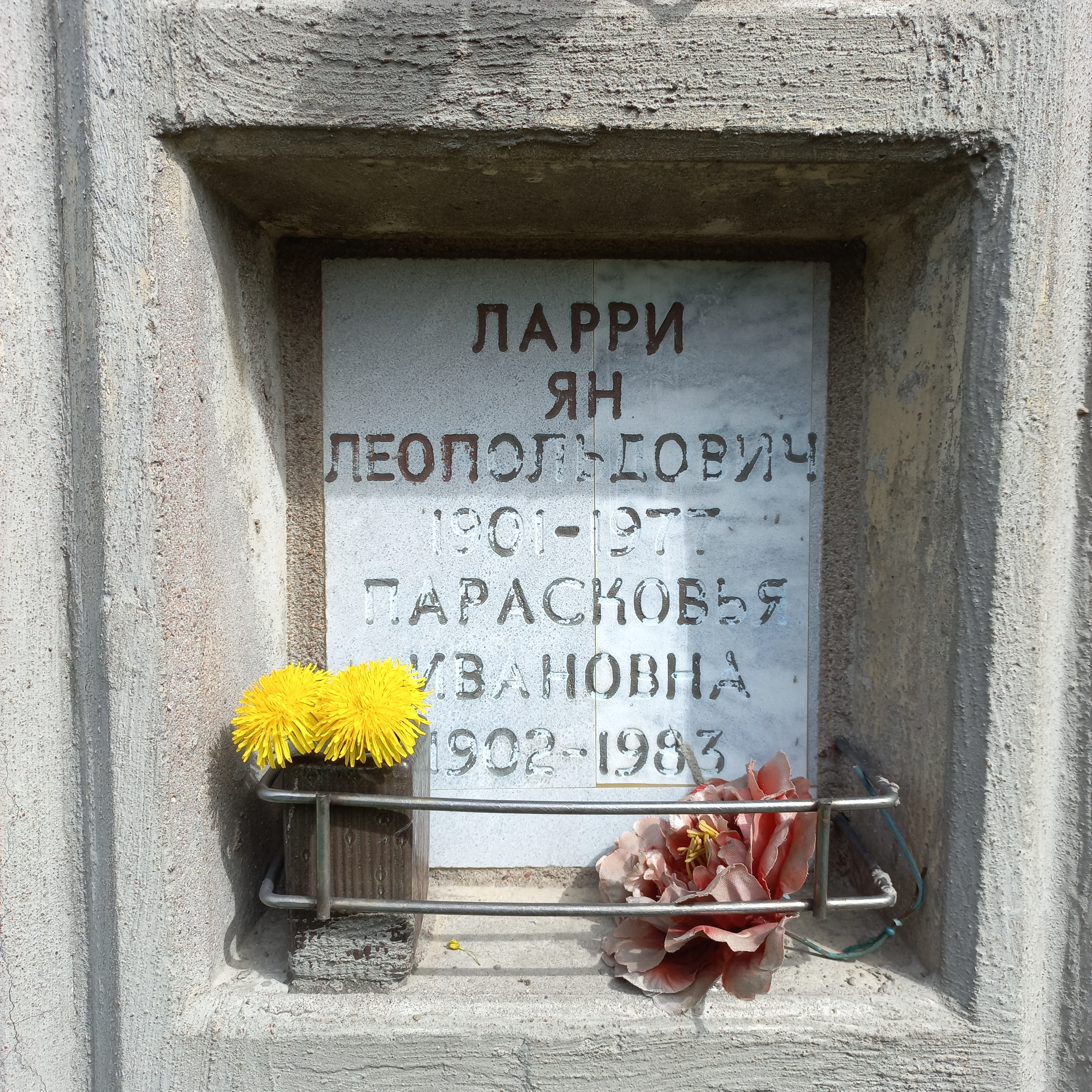
The grave of Jan Larry and his wife at the St. Petersburg Crematorium

Yan Leopoldivich Larri (Russian: Ян Леопольдович Ларри; February 15, 1900 – March 18, 1977) was a Soviet children's writer of Latvian descent. He is best known for children's science fiction novel The Extraordinary Adventures of Karik and Valya.

In 1941 he was arrested and imprisoned for an unusual act. Larri started writing a science fiction novel A Guest from the Sky (Небесный гость) and sending its chapters directly to Joseph Stalin. In the novel an alien visits the Soviet Union and his naive questions and commentaries constitute the criticism of the Soviet life.
