= Larry DeGraw =

Canadian football player

Profile
- Positions: Halfback, Defensive back

Personal information
- Born: c. 1941 (age 84–85)
- Listed height: 5 ft 10 in (1.78 m)
- Listed weight: 275 lb (125 kg)

Career information
- College: Utah

Career history
- 1963–1967: Ottawa Rough Riders
- 1968–1970: Saskatchewan Roughriders

Larry DeGraw (born c. 1941) is a retired Canadian football player who played for the Ottawa Rough Riders and Saskatchewan Roughriders. He played college football at the University of Utah.
