= Larry Sass =

American architect (born 1964)

Lawrence Sass
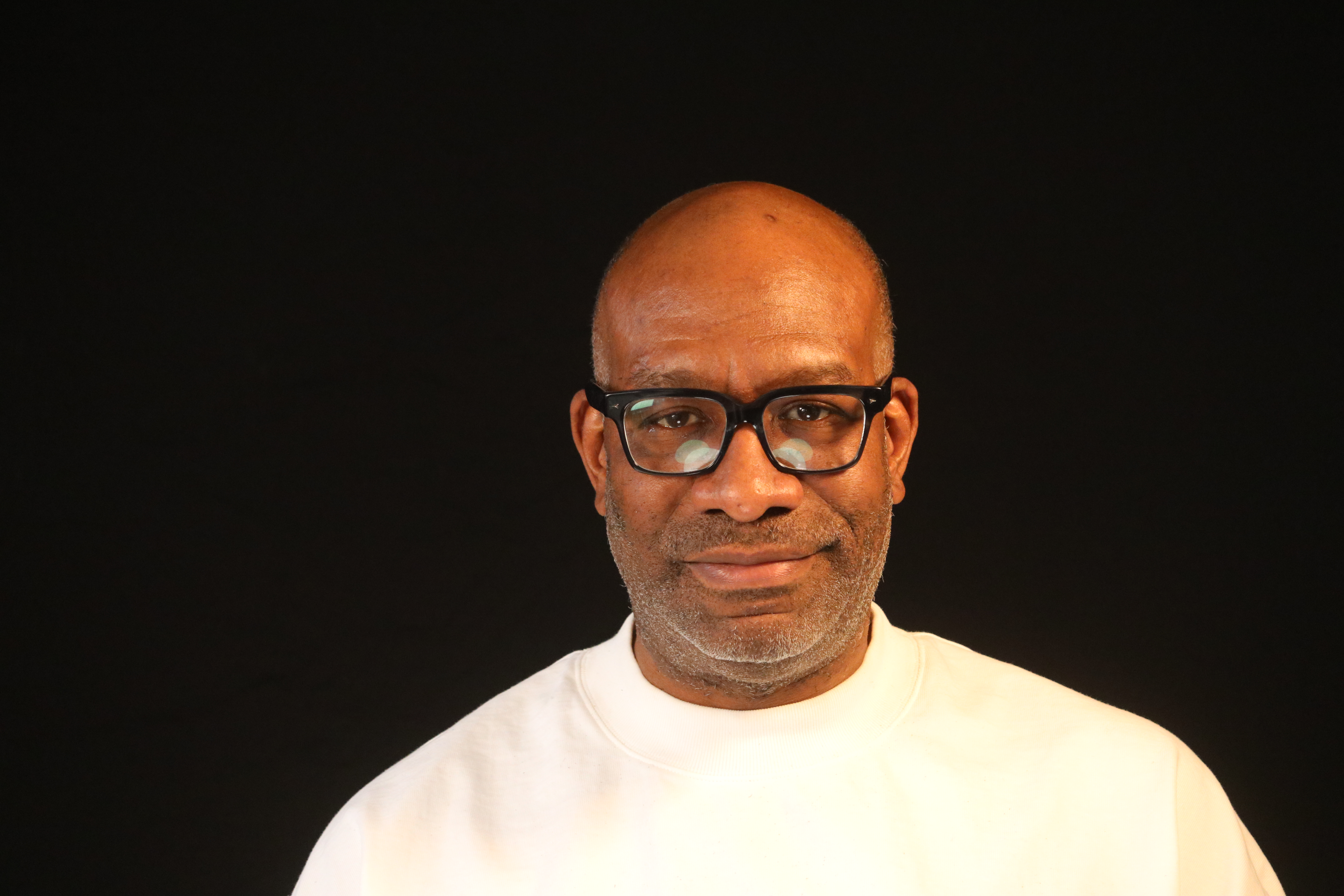
- Sass 2020
- Born: Lawrence Sass; 23 March 1964 (age 62); Harlem, New York, USA
- Occupation: Professor
- Known for: Digitally Fabricated House for New Orleans (2008)

Academic background
- Education: Pratt Institute, BA; MIT, SMArchS & PhD
- Doctoral advisor: William J. Mitchell

Lawrence (Larry) Sass (born 1964) is an American architectural designer, researcher and academic. He is a Professor of Architecture and Director of the Computation Group in the Department of Architecture at MIT. Sass leads the Design Fabrication Group where his research is focused on digital design and fabrication processes of housing.

== Early life and education ==
In a 2011 article for the MIT magazine Spectrum, Sass recalled being introduced to architecture through reading books while visiting his uncle in Harlem, NYC. His interest in architecture continued, and he received a B.Arch from Pratt Institute in 1990. He then completed his post-professional SMArchS degree (in 1994) and earned a Ph.D. (in 2000) from MIT. His dissertation was completed under William J. Mitchell, and did computational reconstructions of Andrea Palladio's designs for two unbuilt villas.

== Projects ==
In 2008, Sass's project "Digitally Fabricated House for New Orleans" was included in a MoMA exhibit titled "Home Delivery: Fabricating the Modern Dwelling."

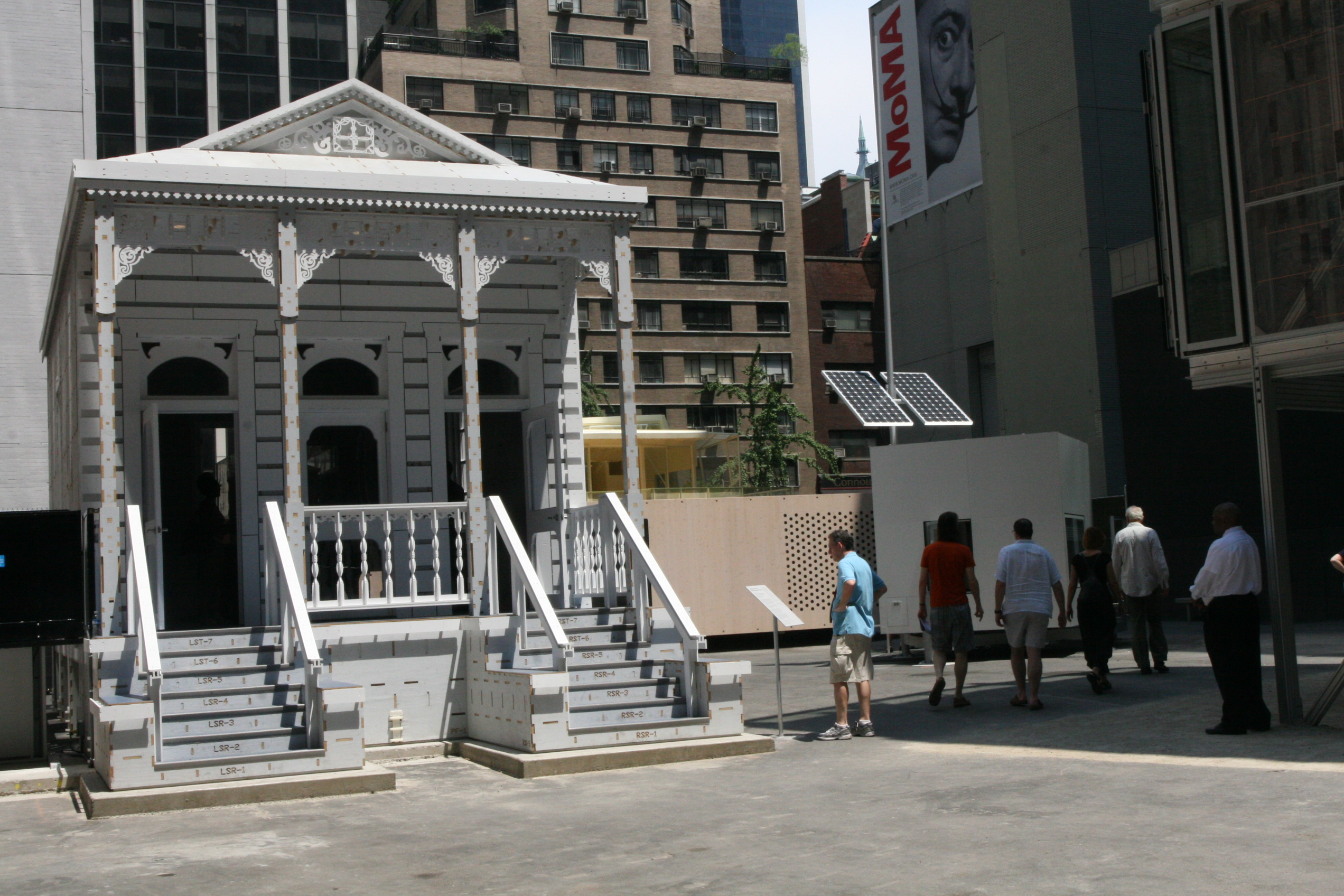

The project proposed a world in which digital fabrication would allow people to order house parts online that would be delivered and assembled on site. Sass imagined this project as a way to broaden access to design and architecture, stating "Most technology is designed for the top 10 percent of the Western world... I want to develop methods for the other 90 percent to participate in the design process so that buildings will reflect their interests... To me, this story is about empowering people to build their own neighborhoods. I want people to design and participate in the production of their own homes, so they can have what they want." The design's use of plywood received some criticism and the topography of the site demanded last-minute interventions.

Sass further developed this project and completed the "Digital Fabrication of Affordable Housing for Somerville, MA" in 2018. This project consisted of a 1/16th scale model made of laser cut 3D printed interlocking components and was conceived as a prototype for computer aided affordable construction.

In Larry Sass's vision of the future, new buildings will rise faster, use fewer resources, cost less, and be more delightful to the eye than ever before. This transformation will be made possible through digital fabrication, a new delivery system for buildings that will enable architects to send computer-designed plans directly to manufacturing—perhaps soon to be 3-D printed. — Kathryn M. O'Neill, "3-D Printed Buildings for A Developing World", MIT Spectrum (Winter 2014)

== Personal life ==
Sass is married to American psychologist Theresa Sass, PhD, who is in private practice in Cambridge, Massachusetts. They have three children and currently serve as Head of MacGregor House at MIT.

== Publications ==
- Chen, Lujie, and Lawrence Sass, "Generative computer-aided design: multi-modality large-scale direct physical production" Computer-Aided Design and Applications 14, no. 1 (2017): 83–94.
- Chen, Lujie, and Lawrence Sass. "Fresh Press Modeler: A generative system for physically based low fidelity prototyping." Computers & Graphics 54 (2016): 157–165.
- Sass, Lawrence, Lujie Chen, and Woong Ki Sung. "Embodied prototyping: exploration of a design-fabrication framework for large-scale model manufacturing." Computer-Aided Design and Applications Vol. 13 Iss.1, 2016 124–137.
- Sass. Larry. "A Palladian Construction Grammar: Design Reasoning with Shape Grammars and Rapid Prototyping." Environment and Planning B, Planning & Design 34, no. 1 (2007): 87.
