= Larry Pusateri =

Larry Pusateri (Luis Archuleta)
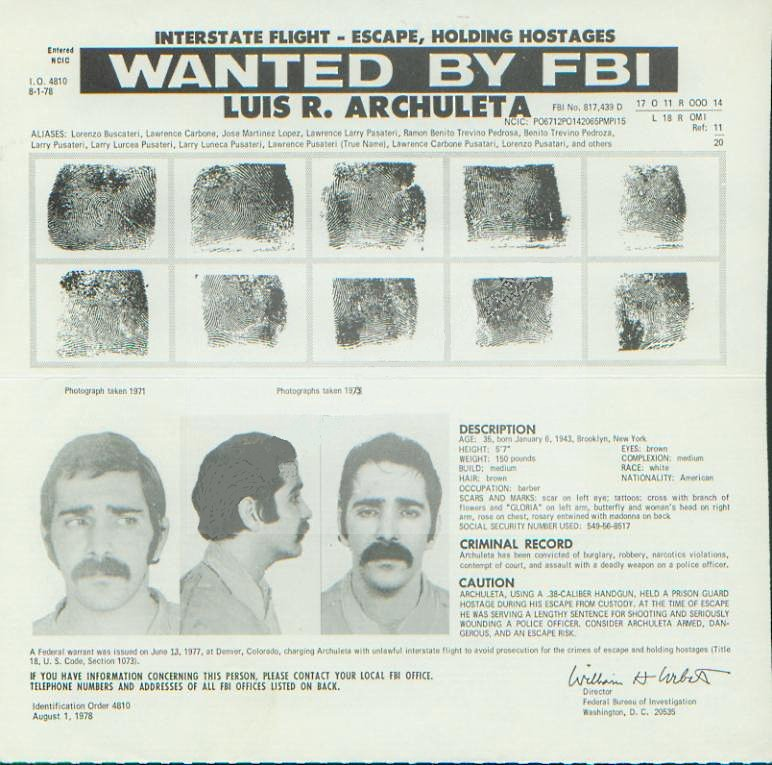
- FBI wanted poster of Luis Archuleta (Larry Pusateri)
- Born: Larry Pusateri; January 6, 1943 (age 81); Brooklyn, New York
- Occupation: Barber
- Known for: Violent felonies and drug trafficking, evading FBI for over 47 years
- Height: 5 ft 7 in (170 cm)
- Children: 1
- Criminal charges: Burglary, robbery, assaulting a police officer with a deadly weapon, drug trafficking, evading prosecution/confinement, contempt of court, holding police officers hostage at gunpoint, aggravated DUI
- Penalty: Sentenced to 9 years in Colorado for shooting Denver police officer Daril Cinquanta; previously escaped from a California prison

Larry Pusateri (born January 6, 1943; a.k.a. Luis R. Archuleta and Ramon C. Montoya) is a former Colorado resident who was wanted by the FBI since 1977 following his escape from a Colorado prison. On August 5, 2020 he was arrested in Española, New Mexico after successfully evading law enforcement and living there for almost 47 years under the alias "Ramon C. Montoya".

== Background ==
Pusateri was born in Brooklyn, New York. He worked as a barber before embarking on a life of crime, which included burglary, robbery, and drug trafficking in both Mexico and the United States.

== Criminal history ==
In 1971, Pusateri shot a Denver police officer named Daril Cinquanta, then fled to Mexico, where he was arrested by federal officials for drug trafficking. Pusateri was then extradited to the U.S. to face trial in Colorado and was sentenced to serve nine years in prison for the crime. He subsequently escaped. Prior to this offense, Pusateri previously escaped from a California prison.

In March 1973, a Denver jury found him guilty of shooting Daril Cinquanta in the 4400 block of Mariposa Street. In 1974, Pusateri escaped while undergoing exams at a state hospital in Pueblo, Colorado. He and three other inmates held several correctional officers at gunpoint with a .38 caliber handgun and then stole a vehicle and escaped custody. Two of the inmates who escaped with Pusateri were eventually caught, but Pusateri evaded capture.

== Life in New Mexico ==
After his successful escape from a Colorado prison, Pusateri settled in Española, New Mexico under the alias Ramon C. Montoya where he lived and evaded the authorities for 47 years. While living in New Mexico, Pusateri was arrested in 2011 for aggravated drunk driving and failure to stay in his lane in Rio Arriba County, New Mexico. From that arrest, law enforcement were able to provide Española police and the FBI with a photo, which eventually led to his capture.

Daril Cinquanta, the police officer who was shot by Pusateri in 1971, and who was working as a private detective at the time, tracked Pusateri to Española, New Mexico after receiving an anonymous tip on June 24, 2020 that Pusateri was living there under the alias Ramon C. Montoya. Cinquanta discovered that "Ramon Montoya" had been arrested in 2011 for a DWI in New Mexico. He subsequently contacted the Española police, who notified the FBI of Pusateri's whereabouts. FBI agents arrested Pusateri at his home in Española on Wednesday, August 5, 2020, after a coordinated investigation between the FBI and the Española Police Department. Little is known about what Pusateri had been doing for nearly 50 years in Española. Cinquanta said Pusateri had a fake Social Security card and a valid New Mexico driver's license.

== America's Most Wanted ==
Larry Pusateri had been featured on the television show America's Most Wanted on two occasions.
