= Larry Phillips =

Larry Phillips may refer to:

- Larry Phillips (New Hampshire politician), former member of the New Hampshire House of Representatives
- Larry Phillips (Washington politician) (born 1951), member of the King County Council in Washington state
- Larry Eugene Phillips, Jr. (1970–1997), bank robber
- Larry Phillips (racing driver) (1942–2004), five-time NASCAR Weekly Series national champion
- Larry Phillips (Texas politician) (born 1966), incoming state district court judge and former member of the Texas House of Representatives
