= Bhatodi, Beed =

Village in Maharashtra

Bhatodi
- Village
- Location in Maharashtra, India
- Coordinates: 18.735°N 75.262°E
- Country: India
- State: Maharashtra
- District: Beed
- Taluka: Ashti

Government
  - Type: Grampanchayat
  - Body: Gram Panchayat of Bhatodi

Population
  - Total: 512

Languages
  - Official: Marathi
- Time zone: UTC+5:30 (IST)
- PIN: 414203
- Vehicle registration: MH-23 / MH-16 mh
- Nearest city: Jamkhed/Ashti
- Sex ratio: 1.12 ♂/♀
- Literacy: 80%
- Sarpunch: Mr.Baliram Gite
- Gramsevak: Mrs.Ujjawala Thore
- First Sarpunch: Mr.Anirudra Shinde
- Climate: HOT (Köppen)

Bhatodi is a small village in Ashti Subdivision in Beed district in the Indian state of Maharashtra. The Gram Panchayat has been established since 1992 as per 73rd Constitutional Amendment. Its population according to the 2011 census was 512, with a literacy rate of 80%.
