= Luri =

Luri may refer to:

- Luri people or Lurs, an Iranian people
- Luri language, Western Iranian language continuum spoken by the Lurs
- Luri dances, Iranian folk dances of Lur people
- Luri clothing, clothes of Iranian Luri people
- Luri language (Nigeria), dialect of the Afro-Asiatic language Polci
- Luri, Haute-Corse, commune in France
- Luri (river), coastal stream in the department of Haute-Corse, Corsica, France
- Andrew Luri, Sudanese-Australian actor
- Diego Luri (born 1985), Brazilian actor, singer and journalist

== See also ==
- Lurs (disambiguation)
- Lari (disambiguation)
- Lurie, a Jewish surname
