= Larry Young =

Larry Young may refer to:

- Larry Young (musician) (1940–1978), American jazz organist
- Larry Young (umpire) (born 1954), American baseball umpire
- Larry Young (race walker) (born 1943), American race walker
- Larry Young, one of the many alter egos of the Marvel Comics anti-hero Deathlok
- Larry Young, former president and CEO of Dr Pepper Snapple Group
- Larry Young (politician) (born 1949), former Maryland State Senator
- Larry J. Young (1967–2024), American psychiatrist
