= Larry Thibos =

American scientist and academic

Larry N. Thibos is an American scientist and academic. He is a professor emeritus at Indiana University and is a researcher in visual neurophysiology.

== Early life and career ==
Thibos received bachelor's and master's degrees in electrical engineering from the University of Michigan. He earned a Ph.D. in 1975 in physiological optics from the University of California, Berkeley. Thibos spent several years as a research fellow at the Australian National University, where he studied neurophysiological processes related to the eye. In the 1980s, he became a faculty member at Indiana University.

Currently he serves as a professor emeritus at the Borish Center for Ophthalmic Research, a division of Indiana University and is a fellow of both American Academy of Optometry and Optical Society. He is also a former editor of Vision Science and the Journal of the Optical Society of America.

== Awards ==
In 1991 he received the Glenn A. Fry Lecture Award. By 2012, along with Sarita Soni, he was honored with the Charles F. Prentice Medal Award. In 2014, he received the President's Research Medal.
