= Adil Lari =

Austrian architect and consultant

- Occupation: Architect
- Website: Official Website

Adil Lari is an Austrian architect specializing in sustainable architecture, ecological engineering, renewable energies and energy policy consulting. He was one of the first persons in Europe in the nineties who engaged in this field. Earning both national and international acclaim through his continuous activities, he has been invited as an expert and lecturer to numerous workshops and conferences. In 1991 he won the Austrian National Award for Domestic architecture for his construction project Solar Housing Plabutsch.

== Education ==
Adil Lari is an Austrian architect with roots in Iraq. He completed his Ph.D. in the field of solar architecture from the Technical University of Graz, in 1999, after finishing his Bachelor and master's degree in architecture from the Technical University of Vienna in 1989.

== Projects ==
=== Sustainable architecture ===
With his apartment complex Solar Housing “Plabutsch” in Graz, Austria, Adil Lari created a building that achieved lowest possible energy needs without the use of expensive and complicated technology. Other projects created by Adil Lari include the Owainati Office Center in Amman, Jordan, the Hotel Holiday Inn in Amman, Jordan, the Hotel Intercontinental in Agaba, Jordan and the Mall in Gasometer A Vienna, Austria.

Foyer of the Hotel Holiday Inn

Owainati Office Center in Amman, Jordan

Solar Housing Plabutsch in Graz, Austria

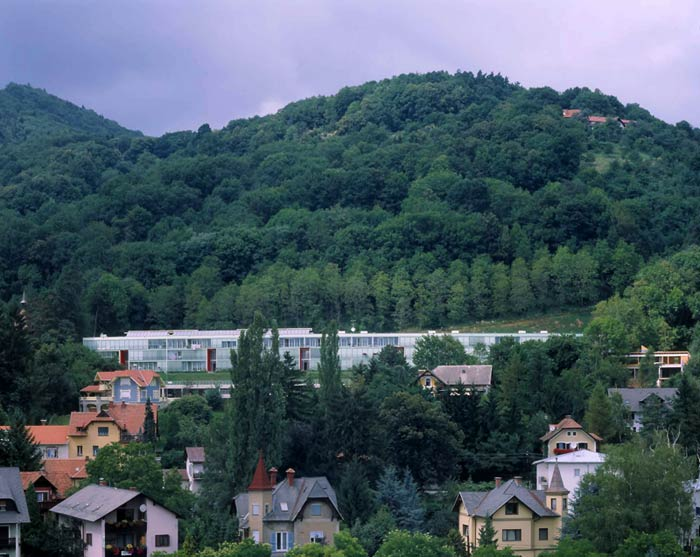
Solar Housing Plabutsch in Graz, Austria

Extension of the Central Bank in Amman, Jordan

Hotel Intercontinental in Agaba, Jordan

Hotel Intercontinental in Agaba, Jordan

Nike Store in Vienna, Austria

SOS Kinderdorf in Medlánky, Czech Republic

=== Research ===
Consecutive to his construction project Solar Housing Plabutsch, Lari conducted the survey "Investigation and Verification of the End-User Behavior for the Housing Complex Bergstraße in Graz". Lari studied the effects of behavior patterns of inhabitants on the energy performance of residential buildings and identified these as a crucial and approachable, yet often neglected, factor for reducing energy consumption. Lari was awarded the Austrian National Housing Design Award in 1991 for his study, being one of the first to investigate user behavior in low-energy and solar housing.

From 2003 to 2005 Adil Lari was responsible for developing feasibility studies and pilot projects, as well as for reviewing national policy and the drafting of action plans, in the course of the LOCOSOC-project aiming towards "Low Energy, Low Cost Social Housing for Enlarged Europe".

Adil Lari was engaged in the DEARSUN-project, which is part of the FP7 of the European Union. Starting in 2008, its goal was the development of a direct solar heating system, capable of covering a full year thermal load, using high temperature thermal storage.

=== Energy policy consulting ===
Adil Lari has been appointed for research projects and scholarships through the European Union and the Austrian Ministry of Economy in the fields of solar architecture, renewable energy and energy policy consulting. He has conducted studies in the area of low-cost and low-energy housing with a minimum of technical equipment and a maximum of energy reduction.

As an expert in the field of energy efficiency and ecology, Adil Lari was commissioned several times by the United Nations Development Programme (UNDP) as an evaluator for projects executed together with the Global Environment Facility (GEF). His evaluations contributed to achieve the optimum success and efficiency of projects in Armenia, Bulgaria, Kazakhstan, Kyrgyzstan, North Macedonia and, in the course of the 2014 Sochi Olympics, Russia.

From 2004 to 2008 Adil Lari was responsible for the Project Management, the development and installation of solar hot water heating systems in several cities and towns across Iran. Following a public tender by the IFCO, a subsidiary of the National Iranian Oil Company, the scope of the project was to replace inefficient boilers burning low-quality fuel oil with innovative and environmentally friendly solar heating systems.

== Awards ==
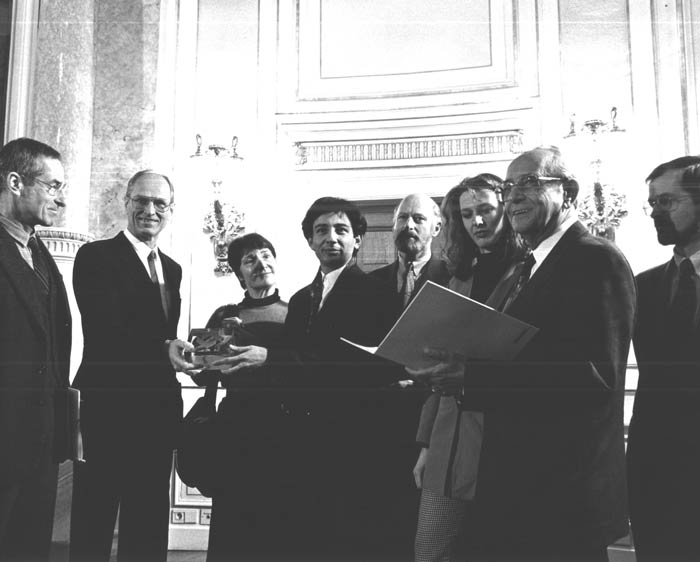
Award Ceremony for the Austrian National Award for Domestic architecture in 1991

1991: Austrian National Award for Domestic Architecture – 1st Place.

1992: Ecology Award of the city of Vienna – 3rd Place.

1998: Austrian National Award for Consulting – nominated.

2001: Austrian National Award for Consulting – nominated.

2007: Austrian National Award for Consulting – nominated.

== Publications ==
In the course of his career, Adil Lari also has published literature at national and international level.

=== Books ===
- Adil Lari: Solar Housing Development Plabutsch, 1999.
- Adil Lari: Saving Heating Energy Easily, 2003.

=== Scientific surveys ===
- Adil Lari: Securing of the Energy Optimizing Solar Housing Development Plabutsch, 1999.

=== Scientific essays ===
- Adil Lari: Czech Austrian Energy Partnership – Strategies for the Ecological Rehabilitation of Panel Buildings, 2001.
- Adil Lari: Investigation and Verification of the End User Behavior for the Housing Complex Bergstraße in Graz, Competition Austrian Prize for Domestic Architecture, 1991.
