= Larry Plancke =

Canadian football player

Larry Planke
Profile
- Positions: Wide receiver, Tackle

Personal information
- Born: c. 1947 (age 78–79)
- Listed height: 6 ft 2 in (1.88 m)
- Listed weight: 220 lb (100 kg)

Career information
- University: Queen's
- CFL draft: 1968: 1st round, 4th overall pick

Career history
- 1968–1969: Edmonton Eskimos

Larry Plancke (born c. 1947) is a Canadian football player who played for the Edmonton Eskimos.
