= Larry J. Seidman =

American neuropsychologist

- Born: Lawrence J. Seidman; March 23, 1950; New York City, US
- Died: September 7, 2017 (aged 67)
- Education: City College of New York; Boston University
- Spouse: Ilene Seidman
- Children: 2
- Awards: William Silen Lifetime Achievement Award from Harvard Medical School (2017)
- Scientific career
- Fields: Neuropsychology; Clinical psychology
- Institutions: Harvard Medical School; Beth Israel Deaconess Medical Center
- Thesis: Lateralized cerebral dysfunction, personality and cognition in temporal lobe epilepsy (1980)

Larry J. Seidman (March 23, 1950 – September 7, 2017) was an American neuropsychologist who served as a professor of psychology at Harvard Medical School starting in 2004, and as vice chair for research in the Massachusetts Mental Health Center Public Psychiatry Division at Beth Israel Deaconess Medical Center starting in 2005. His research focused on the neuropsychology of epilepsy and schizophrenia. On September 7, 2017, he died suddenly of a heart attack at the age of 67. Since 2018, the International Early Psychosis Association (IEPA) has awarded the annual Larry J. Seidman Award for Outstanding Mentorship in his honor.
