= Larry A. Nagahara =

Larry A. Nagahara is an American physicist who works for the National Cancer Institute. He became a fellow in the American Physical Society, after he was nominated by their Topical Group on Instrument and Measurement Science in 2008, for "his pioneering work in developing scanning probe microscopy and other nanotechnology platforms for the analysis, manipulation and measurements at the nanoscale and of molecular components and for the elucidation of the fundamental physical principles underlying these systems."

Since 2016, Nagahara has served as the Associate Dean of Research at Johns Hopkins University's G.W.C. Whiting School of Engineering.

== See also ==
- List of fellows of the American Physical Society (1998–2010)
