= Larry Ivy =

American athletic administrator

Larry Ivy (born 1943/1944) is a former athletic director for the University of Kentucky.

Ivy, an alumnus of the University of Alabama, was hired by the University of Kentucky in 1969 as director of student housing. In 1976, he began working in the athletic department at UK as assistant athletic director and later associate athletics director for internal affairs under then-AD C. M. Newton. He was promoted to senior associate AD in 1993.

On June 30, 2000, Ivy became Athletic Director upon Newton's retirement. On March 5, 2002, Ivy resigned amid a review of the athletic department by UK President Lee Todd, Jr. following discovery of NCAA violations in the football program under coach Hal Mumme.

In April, 2004, Ivy was a candidate for the athletics director position at Tennessee Tech, but withdrew his name from consideration to focus on his business interests. Ivy was one of the rights holders of Papa John's Pizza franchises in Russia.
