= Larry Kosilla =

American businessman and YouTuber

Lawrence Paul Kosilla III
- Born: October 2, 1981 (age 44); White Plains, New York
- Education: University of Virginia
- Occupations: Automotive Detailer, Youtuber, Businessman
- Known for: AMMO NYC, YouTube, Detailing

YouTube information
- Channel: AMMO NYC
- Years active: 2012–present
- Genre: Automobiles
- Subscribers: 2.31 million
- Views: 443 million
- Last updated: August 5th, 2026
- Website: https://ammonyc.com

Lawrence Paul Kosilla III (born October 2, 1981) is an American businessman and YouTuber best known for his car care company AMMO and his YouTube Channel AMMONYC. Kosilla was featured on the /Drive YouTube Channel for three seasons.

== Early life ==
Kosilla was born October 2, 1981, in White Plains, New York and raised by his parents in the city of Rye, New York in Westchester County. He received a hockey scholarship to attend Rye Country Day School and later received a degree in economics from the University of Virginia. Kosilla initially pursued a career as a trader of natural gas commodities on the New York Mercantile Exchange which he left after a year.

== Career ==
Kosilla left his job on Wall Street at age 23 to pursue working with cars. He held a job as a car courier for Cooper Classics in Greenwich Village. The job involved delivering cars to movie sets and photo shoots while Kosilla ensured their safety.

After one year, Kosilla purchased a car wash in Harrison, New York and renamed it The New York Motor Club. He and his business partner started a driving club of the same name based out of the car wash. Kosilla would rent a helicopter to film his first YouTube video which followed the motor club on a drive around NY.

Later, he sold New York Motor Club and transferred to mobile detailing where he built up a clientele including exotic automobile manufacturer Scuderia Cameron Glickenhaus. Kosilla started AMMO NYC in 2011 retailing detailing products. Around the same time, Kosilla hosted "Drive Clean" on the /Drive YouTube Channel for 3 seasons.

In 2012, Kosilla launched a YouTube channel.

In 2016, Kosilla was part of a detailing team that spent 138 hours detailing a 1997 McLaren F1 GTR LT race car. The race car won the "Spirit of the Quail" award at the Quail Concours, a show part of the Monterey Car Week held annually in Monterey, California.

In 2020, AMMO NYC built a studio headquartered in Connecticut where Kosilla details and produces content for YouTube. The videos consist of barn find restorations, exotic car details, and how-to educational car content.

== Personal life ==
Kosilla lives in Connecticut with his family. In his free time he enjoys playing hockey and taking care of his cars. His first car was a 1989 Ford Mustang LX which he purchased in high school.
