= Larry Reed (puppeteer) =

American shadow puppeteer (1944–2026

- Born: Charles Lawson Reed III; June 21, 1944; Los Angeles, California
- Died: January 30, 2026 (aged 81); San Francisco, California
- Education: Yale University, San Francisco Art Institute
- Organization: ShadowLight Productions

Charles Lawson Reed III (June 21, 1944 – January 30, 2026) was an American shadow puppeteer and one of the first Western artists to train in traditional Balinese shadow theatre.

== Early life and education ==
Reed was born in Los Angeles, California, on June 21, 1944. He studied French theatre at Yale University in 1965. In 1966, Reed joined a Peace Corps theater program, through which he worked at the National Theatre of Costa Rica through 1968. Reed earned his Master of Fine Arts from the San Francisco Art Institute.

In the 1970s, Reed traveled to Bali to study traditional shadow puppetry. He later returned to San Francisco and joined the American Association for Eastern Arts, now known as the Center for World Music.

== Career ==
In 1972, Reed founded ShadowLight Productions. He began expanding his work by integrating traditional shadow theatre techniques with a modern theatre style. In the 1990s, Reed developed a method of casting shadows that integrated techniques from cinema, modern theatre, and dance. Reed's shows used three-dimensional shadow masks and handheld puppets projected by point-source lighting onto a 30-foot screen, a method ShadowLight Productions describes as "live animation". ShadowLight Productions had a crew of actors and featured live music played by musicians.

== Personal life ==
Reed met Jane Levy while they were students at the San Francisco Art Institute. They married in 1977 and had two sons.

== Death ==
Reed died from a heart attack at his home in San Francisco, California, on January 30, 2026, at the age of 81.

== Major works ==
=== Shadow Master (1979) ===
Shadow Master is a documentary directed by Reed that has been shown on both PBS and the Discovery Channel. It is about a family of performers in Bali, showing an inside view of Balinese life, as well as the cultural context of the island's theatre, music, and dance. The film takes place over two years, with Reed living and studying with a dalang, I Wayan Wija, and his extended family.

=== In Xanadu (1993–1997) ===
In Xanadu is a Mongolian fantasy written by Zara Houshmand and Reed. The fantasy follows Kublai Khan and his wife, Chabui. The film includes Tibetan, Chinese, and Indonesian theatre techniques. In Xanadu was featured at the 1997 Henson International Festival of Puppetry in New York City and the Spoleto/USA Festival in Charleston, South Carolina. The film was awarded a UNIMA-USA Citation for Excellence.

== Filmography ==
Title	Year	Role
Shadow Master	1982	Producer, director
Conquest of Mexico	1986	Original Shadow Theatre Works
Orfeo	1990	Shadow Design
Body Cak	1990	Projection Design
Dream Shadows	1991	Original Shadow Theatre Works
Pan	1992	Shadow Effects Design
MahabharAnta	1992	Shadow Effects Design
Bima's Journey	1994	Director
The Wild Party	1995	Original Shadow Theatre Works
Sidha Karya	1995	Original Shadow Theatre Works
Mayadanawa	1996	Original Shadow Theatre Works
The Tempest	1996	Shadow Effects Design
In Xanadu	1997	Original Shadow Theatre Works
Blood Wine, Blood Wedding	1997	Shadow Effects Design
Wayang Listrik	1998	Original Shadow Theatre Works
Whale	1999	Shadow Effects Design
Power of Saturn	1999	Shadow Effects Design
Coyote's Journey	2000	Original Shadow Theatre Works
Ain’t Necessarily So	2001	Shadow Effects Design
Kawit Legong	2001	Original Shadow Theatre Works
7 Visions	2002	Original Shadow Theatre Works
A (Balinese) Tempest	2005	Original Shadow Theatre Works
Explorations of the Shadow World	2006	Producer, director
Silk Road	2007	Director Shadow Sequences
We are All In this Together	2007	Consultant
Ethnic Dance Festival	2007	Director Shadow Sequences
Ramayana	2007	Consultant
Mayadanawa	2007	Producer, director
Ghosts of the River	2009	Original Shadow Theatre Works
Monkey King at Spider Cave	2009	Producer, director, Original Shadow Theatre Works
The Good-for-Nothing Lover	2010	Original Shadow Theatre Works
Magic Flute	2011	Director Shadow Sequences
On Wayang	2011	Producer, director
Poro Oyna: Legend of Ainu Rakkur	2012	Original Shadow Theatre Works
Jana and Baladoor	2012	Director Shadow Sequences
Kawit Legong	2012	Producer
Bandung Project	2013	Director
Ghosts of the River	2013	Producer, director
Poro Oyna: The Myth of the Aynu	2014	Original Shadow Theatre Works
Butterfly Lovers	2014	Director
Feathers of Fire	2015	Collaborator
Finding KUKAN	2015	Director Shadow Sequences
The Science Fiction Project 1&2	2016	Director Shadow Sequences
In Visible Light	2017	Director
In Visible Light Cinna: The Clemency of Augustus	2017	Original Shadow Theatre Works
Dewi Sri	2019	Director
The Dark Light	2019	Director
Shadows for Carlos Villa	2020	Original Shadow Theatre Works
Drupadi	2020	Original Shadow Theatre Works
Shadows for Carlos Villa	2020	Co-director
A (Balinese) Tempest	2020	Producer, director
