= Larry g(EE) =

American singer

Larry Gayao (born September 23), better known as Larry g(EE) is a Filipino-American soul-pop artist from Dallas, Texas. He began his career as the lead singer for the Dallas-area rock band Odis, named after the famed soul singer Otis Redding.

After 5 years of performing with Odis in 2010, during a short stint in Brooklyn, New York, Gayao realized that the rock genre was not the direction that he wanted to follow. He could not ignore his yearning to sing soul music. Soon after, he parted ways with the band to pursue a solo singing career.

== Career ==
=== 2005–2010: Odis ===
Their first big break followed after g(EE) passed along a demo tape to on-air personality Terry Jaymes of the Lex and Terry radio show. This opportunity paved the way for the band's numerous local performances such as the 102.1 KDGE's Edgefest, which also boasts artists such as Beck, Kongos and Bastille.

Odis debuted their first song titled "Feel" during an album release performance at the House of Blues in Dallas, to a sold out crowd in 2008. The group disbanded in 2010.

=== 2010–present: Larry g(EE) ===
After leaving the rock group to pursue a solo soul-pop career, Larry needed to distinguish himself from other successful and popular acts on the music scene. He naturally gravitated towards the pseudonym Larry G, but found that the name was too close for comfort to another talented and established musical artist, saxophone player Kenny G. With the help of his brother Chester, another pseudo name took shape by simply stylizing the first initial of his last name and adding two capital "E's" in parentheses. The name and identity Larry g(EE) was born.

He later collaborated with noted music producer Beau Bedford to release the Weekends EP, a sultry soul-pop album composed of four songs in 2011. In June 2014, g(EE) signed a publishing deal with Primary Wave Music, an independent music company based in New York City, known for its high-caliber publishing and music management talent. With the help of producers such as Dennis Herring and Chris Seefried, he is currently working on material for his next album.

== Musical influences ==
Like most successful soul-pop artists of this day, g(EE)'s influences are rooted in the 1960s-era classic soul acts, including artists such as Curtis Mayfield, Sly and the Family Stone, James Brown and Joe Cocker. g(EE) also draws inspiration from his modern-day musical peers, such as Gnarls Barkley and Charles Bradley.

== Discography ==
=== Weekends EP track listing (2011) ===
Track Name	Track Duration	Year
"YoMama"	(3:21)	2011
"I'm Your Fool"	(3:04)	2011
"Camera Phone"	(2:53)	2011
"Game"	(3:44)	2011
