= Mulla Muhammad Lari =

17th-century Iranian general in the Deccan

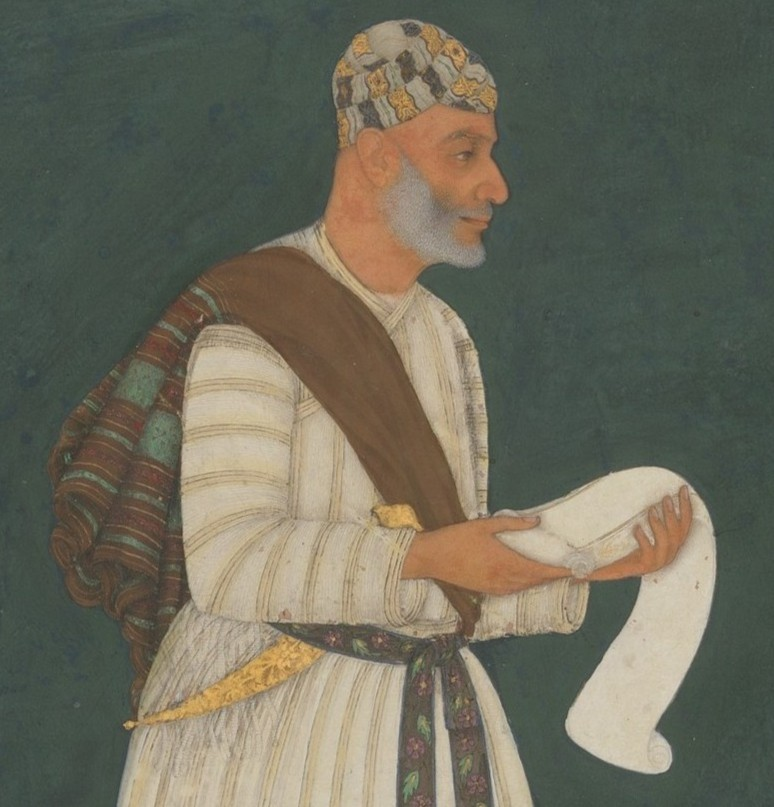
Portrait of Mulla Muhammad Lari by Hashim, dated 1620. Located in the Metropolitan Museum of Art.

Mulla Muhammad Lari (Persian: ملا محمد لاری; died 1624) was a Bijapuri general from Lar in southern Iran. He died at the Battle of Bhatvadi. His portrait by Hashim (fl. 1620 – c. 1660) is one of the first known depictions of the Iranian elite in the Deccan region.

== Sources ==
- Overton, Keelan (2020). "Introduction to Iranian Mobilities and Persianate Mediations in the Deccan". In Overton, Keelan (ed.). Iran and the Deccan: Persianate Art, Culture, and Talent in Circulation, 1400–1700. Indiana University Press. pp. 3–76. ISBN 978-0253048912.
