= Larry Gene Heien =

American linguist

- Born: January 18, 1937; Mt. Olive, Illinois
- Died: Singapore
- Education: B.S. Ed. degree in music, double major PhD in Russian language and literature and higher education administration
- Alma mater: Eastern Illinois University, Indiana University Bloomington
- Occupation: Scholar
- Spouse: Debra Lee Pingree
- Children: 3

Larry Gene Heien (January 18, 1937 – September 12, 1991) was an American linguist, Slavist, expert of Russian studies and Russian language teaching, also known for his interest in music. In 1969 – January 1991 he was assistant professor, later from 1984 full professor of Russian in the University of Hawaiʻi at Mānoa.

== Biography ==
Heien was born in Mt. Olive, Illinois, and grew up in Decatur, Illinois. His parents were Arthur F. and LaVetta Heien. In 1959 he received a B.S. Ed. degree in music from Eastern Illinois University. In 1967 he received the master's degree in Slavic languages and in 1969 a double major PhD in Russian language and literature and higher education administration from Indiana University Bloomington (doctoral thesis "A psycholinguistic study in the organization and presentation of grammatical principles").

In the fall of 1969 Heien started his work at the University of Hawaii as assistant professor in the European Language Department and was promoted in 1984 to full professor. In the European Language Department he held positions of the chair of the Russian Division (1975–76, 1980–86), chair of Russian graduate program (1975–76, 1980–86), and chair of the Russian Area Studies program (1977–79, 1983–85), participated in numerous scientific conferences and in exchange programs with the USSR. In 1975 he did a year of research in the Pushkin Institute of the Russian Language in Moscow.

He was member of the Modern Language Association, AATSEEL(American Association of Teachers of Slavic and Eastern European Languages), ACTR(American Council on Teaching of Russian) and ACTFL(American Council on Teaching of Foreign Languages).

Heien had a near-native command of Russian, and besides Russian he also spoke French, Bulgarian, German and Polish. His research interests included applied linguistics and language teaching methodology, contemporary Russian language, Russian word frequency, and Russian music.

Since music was one of his lifelong interests, he was offered a grant to translate the book "Stravinsky’s early ballets" of Irina Vershinina. Professor. Heien also worked on a Russian textbook “Reading Russian for Musicians”. Unfortunately both books remain unpublished. He taught a course of Russian to University of Hawaiʻi music students.

After retiring due to the reasons on health from the University of Hawaiʻi in January 1991, Heien died on September 12, 1991, in Singapore from the autoimmune disease amyloidosis.

=== Personal life ===
Heien was married twice, first time during his student days in Eastern Illinois University to Nancy Mansfield with whom he had two sons, Jeffrey and Stephen. He divorced her in 1979. In 1983 he married Debra Lee Pingree, who was working on her master's degree under his guidance. They had daughter Amanda, born in 1987.

=== Interesting facts ===
Among colleagues he was known for his wry sense of humor and had the nickname of Zoshchenko (Zoshchenko was famous Russian humorist).

== Publications ==
=== Books ===
Vershinina, Irina Iakovlevna. Stravinsky's early ballets. Transl. by Larry Heien. Ann Arbor: UMI Research Press, [was scheduled to appear in 1990 but was never published] 230 p.

=== Chapters in books ===
"Loanword recognition in Russian" pages 43–53 IN: Russian without a dictionary: reading and listening, edited by Frank Ingram. (East Lansing: Russian language journal, 1984 )

"An experimental approach to language teaching" pages 28–32 IN: Teaching, learning, acquiring Russian (Columbus, Ohio: Slavica Publishers, 1984)

"Bystro li Bistro?: Russians and French cabarets" pages 105-116 IN: East meets West: homage to Edgar C. Knowlton, Jr.; edited by R. Hadlich and J.D. Ellsworth (Honolulu:UH Press, 1989)

=== Articles ===
"The use of eyes in Fadeev’s novel Razgrom," [Soviet literature], Institute of Foreign Literature, Chinese Academy of Social Sciences, Beijing, 1986, number 6, pages 80–85. Transl. into Chinese by Sih Junzhi [Julia].

"Loanword recognition in Russian," Russian language journal, 1984, volume XXXVIII, fall, number 131, pages 51–62.

"Роль родного языка в развитии слушания и понимания звучащей речи (начальный этап)" [Role of the mother tongue in development of audition skills and understanding of oral language(the initial stage)], Русский язык за рубежом (Russian language abroad), 1974, number 2 (30), pages 82–85.

"Root frequency in scientific Russian," Russian language journal, 1980, volume XXXIV, winter, number 117, pages 57–81.

"Towards a systematic development of listening comprehension," Russian language journal, 1975, volume XXIX, number 103, pages 85–93.

"Принципы организации граматического материала при программированном обучении." Russian language journal, 1973, number 96, pages 56–62.

"Language teaching in different keys," The modern language journal, 1973, volume LVII, number 4, pages 185-189.

"Coordinating the teaching of European languages," with colleagues Raymond Moody, John E. Crean, and David J. Quinn; and "Current research on learning and teaching," with Raymond Moody, Educational perspectives, 1973, volume 12, number 4, pages 16–20, pages 21–26.

"Testing the speaking skill in the language laboratory," Hawaii language teacher, 1970, volume 12, number 2, pages 88–92.

=== Papers ===
"Исследование и преподавание русской-советской литературы в американских университетах" [Research on and teaching of Russian /Soviet literature in American universities], presented to the faculty of the Institute of Foreign Literature, Academy of Sciences, Beijing, People's Republic of China, July 1984

"Узнавание заимствованых слов в научной речи" [Recognition of loanwords in scientific Russian], V MAPRIAL (International Congress of Teachers of Russian language and literature), Prague, Czechoslovakia, August 1982

"Новое исследование на частотность корней в научной речи" [Further research on root frequency in scientific Russian], II Soviet-American Conference on the Russian language, Northwestern University, September 1981

"Основная роль глагола в обучении специалистов чтению научного материала" [The primary role of the verb in teaching specialists to read scientific Russian], VI MAPRIAL, Budapest, Hungary, August 1986
