= Larry Harris (computer scientist) =

American AI researcher and businessman

Larry R. Harris
- Born: 1947 (age 78–79)
- Education: Cornell University
- Occupations: Scholar and businessperson
- Notable work: Artificial Intelligence Enters the Marketplace

Larry R. Harris is an American researcher and businessperson. He is best known for his work in artificial intelligence, and is founder of the companies AICorp and EasyAsk, originally known as Linguistic Technology Corporation.

== Early life and career ==
Harris was born in 1947. He received his PhD from Cornell University in 1970, where his dissertation was entitled A Model for Adaptive Problem Solving Applied to Natural Language Acquisition. It focused on the process of how a robot might learn a language's vocabulary and grammar from exploring a room receiving commentary from a human. He then became an assistant professor, and later an associate professor, of Mathematics at Dartmouth College, and developed the first computer educational programs at the university. In 1973 he developed the Dartmouth Computer Chess Program, where he led a team of undergraduates to develop a computer chess program that competed in national computer chess tournaments. Harris also worked in helping machines solve language problems. As a researcher, he studied the area of Natural Language Data Base Query, providing the ability to ask ordinary English questions about the contents of computer databases. The research system was named ROBOT. Early papers of his were published in journals including the International Journal of Man-Machine Studies and the Journal of Cybernetics. In 1977 Harris was a visiting professor at the MIT AI Lab.

== Business career ==
Harris cofounded Artificial Intelligence Corporation (later known as AICorp) in 1975, as CEO and chairman, where he developed the mainframe product, INTELLECT, which was available for purchase as of 1981, and became a widely used natural language mainframe interface product in the early 1980s. The system used a basic lexicon of 400 words automatically augmented by the words and names in the database itself. In 1983, Intellect became the first software product created by an outside vendor to be sold by IBM. Through the product, Harris became one of the first entrepreneurs to make a profit based on artificial intelligence technology. In 1988 he also co-developed the Knowledge-Base Management System (KBMS), which enabled an inference engine to reason over information stored in relational databases. AICorp went public in 1990, trading on the NASDAQ. In 1994, Harris founded Linguistic Technology Corporation, which did business as EasyAsk, which enabled English language questions to be asked on personal computers about information in databases or on the internet. In 2005 EasyAsk was acquired by Progress Software. From 1995 to 2005, Harris was on the board of directors for Progress Software.

== Books ==
In 1986 Harris co-authored the book Artificial Intelligence Enters the Marketplace with D.B. Davis, which discussed the early commercial possibilities within the artificial intelligence industry.
