= Emblem of the Maldives =

National emblem of Maldives

- Armiger: Republic of Maldives
- Shield: A star and crescent or atop a coconut palm proper
- Supporters: The National Flag of Maldives on either side
- Motto: الدولة المحلديبية "State of the Mahal Dibiyat"

The National Emblem of the Maldives consists of a coconut palm, a crescent, and two criss-crossing National Flags with the traditional Title of the State.

== Interpretation ==
The depicted coconut palm represents the livelihood of the Nation according to Maldivian folklore and tradition. The inhabitants believe it to be the most beneficial tree to them as they use every part of the tree on various applications ranging from medicine to boat building. The crescent (a universal Islamic symbol) and its accompanying star embodies the Islamic faith of the State and its authority respectively.

The words of the scroll Ad-Dawlat Al-Mahaldibiyya are written in the Arabic naskh style of script. They were used by Sultan AI-Ghazee Mohamed Thakurufaanu Al-Azam one of the most illustrious heroes of the nation. The title Ad-Dawlat Al-Mahaldibiyya (Arabic: الدولة المحلديبية) means the "State of the Mahal Dibiyat", which is the name Ibn Battuta and other Medieval Arab travellers used to refer to the Maldives.

== Modern usage ==
The Coat of Arms is a symbolic representation of the Government of Maldives and is used frequently in official documents (on the header right underneath the Bismillah) and other Governmental Representations.

== Former versions ==
The crescent and star in the middle of the Maldive Coat of Arms used to be pale blue and white (silver) at the time of its first design in the 1940s during Muhammad Amin Doshimēna Kalēgefānu's regency. The color of the crescent and star was changed to gold in late July 1995, during the 30th anniversary of its independence.
