= Larin (currency) =

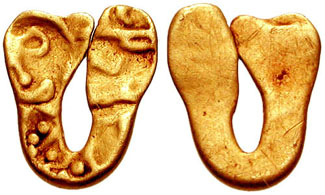
Gold Indian Larin
Three punches: two with Kannada inscriptions, one with uncertain animal.
c. 12–13th century, from "Walve Hoard"

Larin (plural: lari) is the name of a class of objects serving as coins in areas around the Arabian Sea. The name is derived from Lar, a Persian town that according to tradition would have been the first to produce lari. A larin was a piece of silver wire of about 10 centimeters long, usually folded in two equal parts and shaped like a C, though there are also lari shaped like a J, an I or an S. Lari were stamped with an Arabic or Persian text, usually the name of the local ruler.

The Larin, also known as "Koku Ridi" (Silver Hook) was in use in the Kandyan Kingdom from 17th to early part of the 19th century in Sri Lanka and were made by private parties, five of which went to a piece-of-eight, or a Spanish Dollar. These coins with a shape like a fish-hook, bear no legend, or at best poor imitations of Arabic letters; they are usually somewhat thick and short, frequently shows one or more cuts at the bend, apparently made to test the purity of the metal. During the Portuguese period larins enjoyed widespread use in Ceylon (Sri Lanka).

The silver larin coinage, which originated in the Persian Gulf, was used extensively from that region around the coast of the Indian Ocean as far as Lanka during the period 16th and 17th centuries. Larins used in Lanka were bent into a "fish-hook" shape whereas those of other regions were straight. Larins actually produced in Lanka bore either imitation Persian inscriptions or meaningless designs: though specimens bearing western inscriptions are reported to have also been produced. Larins of more northerly origin that reached Lanka in the course of trade tended to be bent into "fish-hook" shape when they later subserved the currency needs of the island.

A 17th century larin would weigh about 4.75 grams. It was traditionally tariffed at 5.5 lari to the Spanish colonial piece of eight.

Lari is the root of coin denominations used in Georgia and the Maldives.
