= Maldivian laari =

Coin denomination issued by the Maldives

The laari (Dhivehi: ލާރި) is a coin denomination issued by the Maldives as the subdenomination of the Maldivian rufiyaa since 1960. One rufiyaa is equal to 100 laari. It was issued in denominations of 1, 2, 5, 10, 25 and 50.

The name of the currency is derived from lari. The earliest laari were bent silver wires reminiscent of the early coins from Lar.

The Maldive Islands have been using laari for centuries but they were first described by François Pyrard de Laval, who lived on the islands between 1602 and 1607.

The current coins are made out of a range of metals, including nickel, brass, cupronickel and aluminium. The coins are issued by the Maldives Monetary Authority (MMA) and struck at the Royal Mint in Llantrisant, Wales.
