= Crozer =

Crozer may refer to:

== People ==
- Elizabeth Warder Crozer Campbell (1893–1971), American archeologist
- John Price Crozer (1793–1866), American textile manufacturer, banker, and philanthropist
- Mark Crozer, English musician

== Places ==
- Crozer Arboretum, arboretum and garden park in Upland, Pennsylvania
- Crozer-Chester Medical Center
- Crozer Theological Seminary, religious institution in Upland, Pennsylvania

== Other uses ==
- Crozer-Keystone Health System, a four-hospital health system
