= Elizabeth Crozer Campbell =

American archeologist

Elizabeth Campbell
- Born: Elizabeth Warder Crozer; August 11, 1893; Beach Haven, New Jersey, US
- Died: December 21, 1971 (aged 78); Twentynine Palms, California, US
- Resting place: Twentynine Palms Cemetery
- Other names: Elizabeth Campbell, Elizabeth Warder Crozer, Betty Campbell
- Occupation: Archaeologist
- Known for: Development of Environmental Archaeology techniques and establishing the presence of man in Pleistocene California deserts.
- Spouse(s): William Henry Campbell (1920-1944; his death); Joe Cecil Turman (annulled)

Elizabeth Warder Campbell (née Crozer; August 11, 1893 – December 21, 1971) was an American archeologist, notable for proposing a much earlier date for the presence of humans in the desert Southwest than was generally accepted. She worked with her husband William (Bill) Campbell and first proposed that artifacts found along the shores of Lake Mojave and other Pleistocene lakes and rivers of the desert West were contemporaneous with the presence of water. They showed that there were virtually no sites that were not associated with archaic water sources. They hypothesized that the geologic features associated with the artifacts could be used to date the period of human habitation. This is the first use of what has become known as environmental archaeology.

== Life ==
Elizabeth Warder Crozer was the youngest of four daughters born to upper class parents: John Price Crozer II and Elizabeth Steger Warder Crozer of Upland, Pennsylvania. She was born on August 11, 1893, at the Crozer summer cottage in Beach Haven, New Jersey.

Her father was the grandson of John Price Crozer, founder of the Crozer textile mills and possessor of the Crozer fortune. When the elder John Crozer died the younger John Crozer inherited the mills and formed a partnership with his father under the name: S. A. Crozer and Son. When S. A Crozer died in 1910 John inherited coal companies, an iron and steel company, shares of a railroad and farms. The Crozer family founded the Crozer Theological Seminary, the Crozer Arboretum, and the Crozer Quarterly. They also built the George K. Crozer Mansion and are the namesake of the Crozer-Keystone Health System.

Her uncle was Hermann Volrath Hilprecht, professor of Assyriology at the University of Pennsylvania and a scholar of Near Eastern archaeology. He was involved in the excavations at the Near Eastern site of Nippur. Campbell described in her diary how her Aunt Sallie would travel with Hilprecht to Europe and how "..[s]he never let her loveliness interfere with anything. She climbed the pyramids with three Arabs to push and pull."

Campbell was schooled at home by a French tutor until age fourteen. In the fall of 1909 she began attending Miss Irwin's School (later the Agnes Irwin School) and graduated in 1911. Until World War II the education of most daughters of Philadelphia high society who attended Miss Irwin's ended at the secondary level. This was Campbell's last formal education.

Campbell married William (Bill) Campbell in May 1920. Bill had served in World War I and had been gassed two days before the armistice of November 11, 1918. His lung damage, due to exposure to mustard gas, caused them to move to Los Angeles, California, and later to the drier climes of Twentynine Palms where they established a homestead.

When Campbell's father died in 1926 she inherited a trust that enabled her and Bill to live comfortably for the rest of their lives.

The Campbells maintained their residence in Twentynine Palms, and lived in a summer home on the shores of Lake Tahoe, near Glenbrook, Nevada, where Bill died in June 1944. After his death, Campbell sold the house in Twentynine Palms and moved to Carson City, Nevada, where she met and married Joe Cecil Turman. The marriage lasted a short time before it was annulled. She moved to Tucson, Arizona, around 1952 where she lived until 1961.

While living in Tucson she became a research associate with the Arizona State Museum and continued to work on the collections she and Bill had assembled over the years. In 1957, she had Arizona State Museum exhibit designer Robert Baker design a laboratory on the second floor of her Tucson home. During this time she also wrote a memoir about homesteading in Twentynine Palms, The Desert was Home. Campbell made a trip to Twentynine Palms for an event marking the publication of her book and made the decision to move back there. She remained in Twentynine Palms for the rest of her life.

Campbell died on December 21, 1971.

== Career in archaeology ==
Campbell developed an interest in archaeology after she and Bill moved to Twentynine Palms. She began collecting arrowheads from nearby sand dunes while gathering firewood. When Bill McHaney, an old prospector who often visited their camp, told stories about Indian culture and caches of pottery, she listened and took notes. They would drive their trusty automobile -- "The Ship of the Desert"—into the surrounding countryside looking for archaeological sites and visiting locations that McHaney told them about. It was said that archaeology met Campbell's need for "intellectual effort and accomplishment" and ameliorated the lonely desert life.

The Campbells were among the earliest archaeologists in the California desert. At the time (1925) virtually nothing was known about how long humans had lived in the deserts and the use of stratigraphy as a means of chronological ordering of archaeological assemblages was just beginning.

Campbell's first monograph was published by the Southwest Museum in 1931. In 1932, the Campbells were appointed fellows in archaeology of the Southwest Museum and hosted a conference in Twentynine Palms on April 22–23 of that year.

In 1933, the Campbells began their investigation of Pinto Basin. The area is associated with an extinct river channel and a dry lake bed. Campbell began consulting with geologists and paleontologists at the California Institute of Technology. Geologist David Scharf authored the geological chapter of the Pinto Basin report in one of the first collaborations of geologists and archaeologists. The artifacts from Pinto Basin were associated with the dry stream channel known as Pinto Wash and the lake bed known as Palen Dry Lake. This suggested that these sites were occupied during the period of time when the desert was considerably wetter. The Campbells argued that this wet period was not recent and presented as evidence the ground-water level being 97 feet below the surface of the surrounding arid mountain ranges. Starting with the Pinto Basin report, and for all research after, Campbell collaborated and consulted with well-known professionals in the fields of geology, paleontology, and archaeology. This increased her professional status and standing with the archaeological community.

In early 1934, the Campbells collected artifacts from the high shorelines of Silver Lake playa (the northern basin of Lake Mojave) and in 1935 they collected from the shorelines of Soda Lake playa (the southern basin of Lake Mojave). She stated she and Bill wanted to become experts in playa culture. Campbell believed that most ancient sites would be located in the Great Basin.

In 1936, Campbell published her seminal paper "Archaeological Problems in the Southern California Deserts" in which she outlined her hypothesis that associated prehistoric peoples with certain landforms. She believed a thorough study of the spatial relationships of artifact assemblages to the landscape would illuminate their chronology. This approach is clearly laid out in the Lake Mohave report where she wrote:

In order to prove that a site has great age, it should be a pure site; that is, the artifacts should represent one period only, and it should be situated where the geology of the regions points to antiquity. For this reason we have sought man's ancient remains along extinct river channels and about the strand lines of playas and fossil lakes, indicated as such by beaches, terraces, spits, and wave-cut cliffs -- mute testimony to a past day of moister climate. We have not be disappointed in our search for locations by geological indication, for during the last two years the Desert Laboratory of the Southwest Museum has found and studied ten sites of the desired type. As all of these are now far from water, their occupants no doubt belonged to a period of greater rainfall.

Noted archaeologists of the day disagreed with Campbell's interpretation and this rejection of her hypothesis continued into the 1950s. Malcolm Rogers' report contained a number of factual errors that were not recognized until the 1950s and 60s.

== Legacy ==
Archaeologists continue to study the Campbell collections house at Joshua Tree National Park and the Autry Museum, and they continue to revisit the sites they visited, collected and studied.

Elizabeth Crozer Campbell's contributions include:

- Campbell, Elizabeth Warder Crozer (1931). "An Archaeological Reconnaissance of the Twentynine Palms Region". Southwest Museum Papers (7). Pasadena, California: Southwest Museum.
- Campbell, Elizabeth Warder Crozer; Campbell, William (1935). "The Pinto Basin Site: An Ancient Aboriginal Camping Ground in the California Desert". Southwest Museum Papers (9). Los Angeles, California: Southwest Museum.
- Campbell, Elizabeth W. Crozer (1936). "Archaeological Problems in the Southern California Deserts". American Antiquity. 1 (4): 295–300. doi:10.2307/275244. JSTOR 275244. S2CID 163333176.
- Campbell, Elizabeth Warder Crozer; Campbell, William H.; Antevs, Ernst; Amsden, Charles E.; Barbieri, J.A.; Bode, F.D. (1937). The Lake Mohave Site. The Archaeology of Pleistocene Lake Mohave: A Symposium. Southwestern Museum Papers. No. 11. Los Angeles, California: Southwest Museum. pp. 9–44.
- Campbell, Elizabeth W. Crozer (1 April 1949). "Two Ancient Archeological Sites in the Great Basin". Science. 109 (2831): 340. Bibcode:1949Sci...109..340C. doi:10.1126/science.109.2831.340. PMID 17838691.
