= William Bucknell =

American businessman and philanthropist (1811–1890)

William Robert Bucknell (April 1, 1811 – March 5, 1890) was an American real estate investor, businessman, philanthropist, and benefactor to Bucknell University, for whom the university is named.

== Early life and education ==
Bucknell was born in Marcus Hook, Pennsylvania, to English immigrants. His father was a Lincolnshire farmer, carpenter, and early settler of Delaware County, Pennsylvania. He had intermittent schooling and was trained as a wood carver.

== Career ==
Bucknell began his career as a wood carver, acquired some savings from that trade and set himself up in business. After his first marriage, Bucknell began conducting real estate transactions with the purchase of suburban lands and the erection of buildings.

Bucknell invested in laying gas lines in the city of Chester, Pennsylvania. He founded the Chester Gas Company in 1856. Bucknell became a director in the United Gas Improvement Company of Philadelphia. Bucknell was also a director in the Buffalo Gas Light Company.

Bucknell later ran a brokerage business in Philadelphia, which traded in securities and real estate. Bucknell had a large ownership in The Cleveland & Pittsburgh Railroad, The Philadelphia & Reading Railroad, The United Railroads of New Jersey and various coal and iron mines.

=== Bucknell Mansion ===
Bucknell built an Italianate brownstone mansion at the corner of 17th and Walnut Streets in Philadelphia circa 1860. The building was demolished in 1907 and replaced with the Latham Hotel.

=== Bucknell University ===
In 1882, Bucknell donated $50,000 to University at Lewisburg when it was experiencing financial troubles. In 1886, the university changed its name from the University at Lewisburg to Bucknell University in his honor.

=== Baptist Organizations ===
Bucknell was a generous donor to the Upland Baptist Church in Upland, Pennsylvania. He was also a member and major contributor to the First Baptist Church in Philadelphia. Bucknell helped fund the erection of the Baptist Publication House in Philadelphia. He also established the Rangoon Mission in India and paid the expenses of ten missionaries in India for several years.

=== Pearl Hall ===
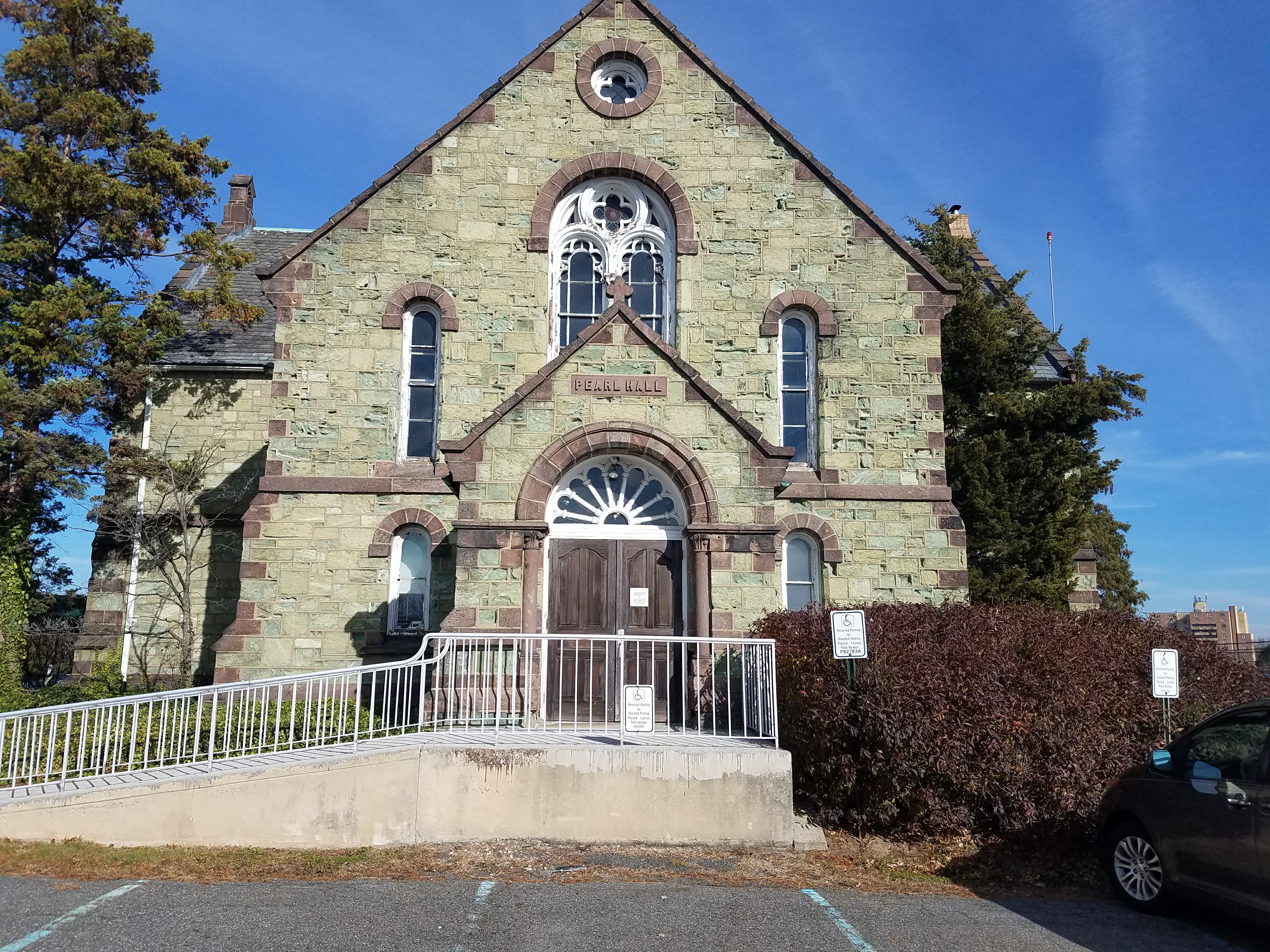
Pearl Hall Library at Crozer Theological Seminary in Upland, Pennsylvania, which Bucknell had built in memory of his wife, Margaret Crozer

Bucknell sponsored the building of Pearl Hall, a serpentine stone library built on the campus of the Crozer Theological Seminary, in memory of his late wife, Margaret Crozer, daughter of textile manufacturer John Price Crozer. In addition to the $30,000 cost of the building, Bucknell also gave $25,000 for the cost of books and $10,000 for an endowment fund. Pearl Hall formally opened on June 4, 1871. Pearl Hall is currently part of the campus of the Crozer-Chester Medical Center.

== Personal life ==
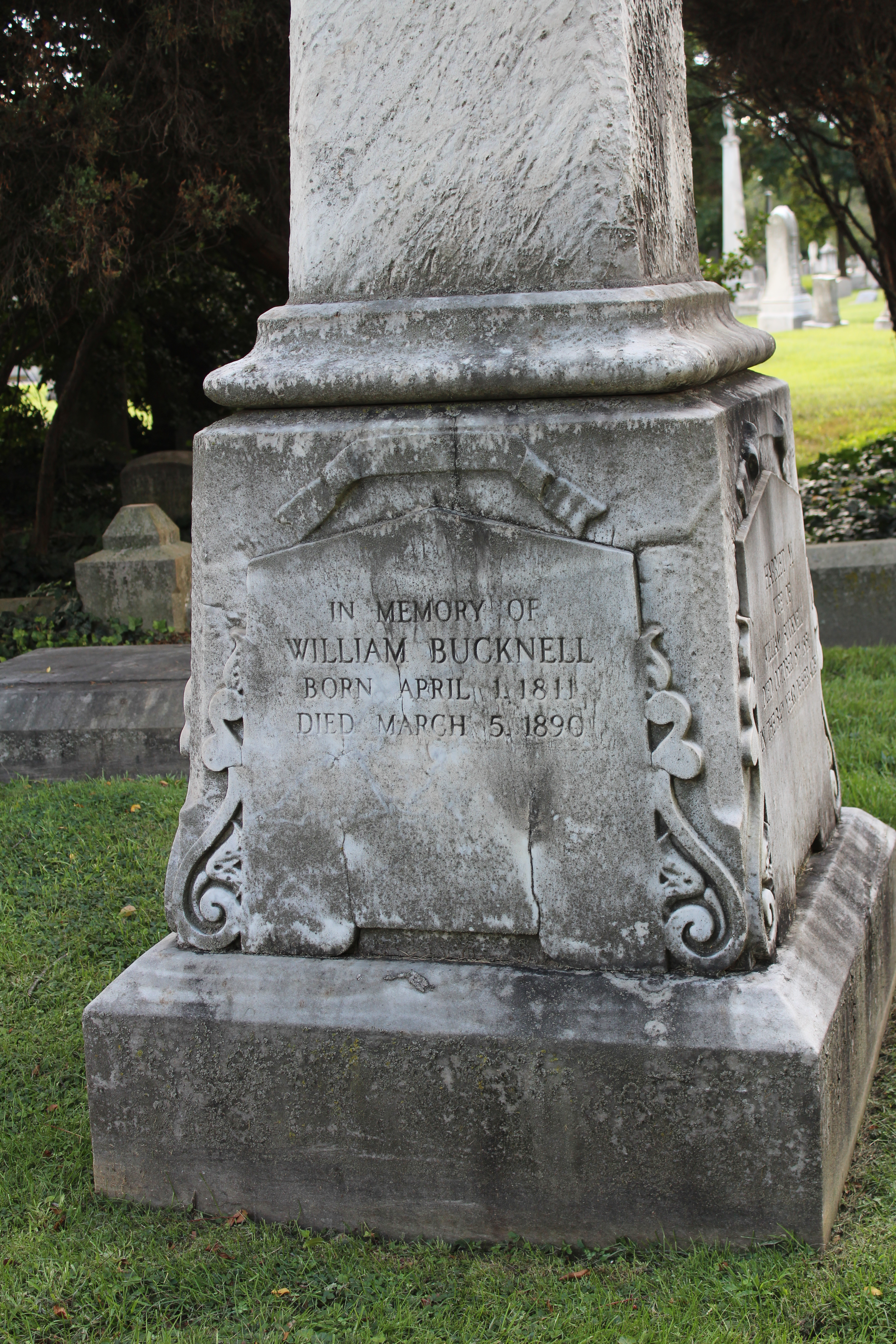
William Bucknell Grave at the Woodlands Cemetery in Philadelphia

Bucknell married Harriet Burr Ashton (1815-1851), in 1836 and had five children, Lavinia Louisa (b. 1840), William Ashton (b. 1842), William Rufus Babcock (b. 1847), Sarah (b. 1849), and Harriet (b. 1851).

After the death of his first wife, he married Margaret Knowles Crozer (1827-1870). After Margaret's death in 1870, he married for a third time, to 18 year old Emma Eliza Ward (1852-1927) in 1871. They had four children, Howard (1874-1962), Margaret Crozer (1876-1963, who married Count Daniele Pecorini), Gertrude (1877-1936, who married Jay Gould Day), and Edith Louise (1880-1944, who married Samuel Price Wetherill, Jr.)

Bucknell's widow, Emma, was a survivor of the sinking of the RMS Titanic in 1912.

== Death ==
Bucknell died March 5, 1890, and is interred at the Woodlands Cemetery in Philadelphia.
