= British Library cyberattack =

Ransomware attack on major UK library

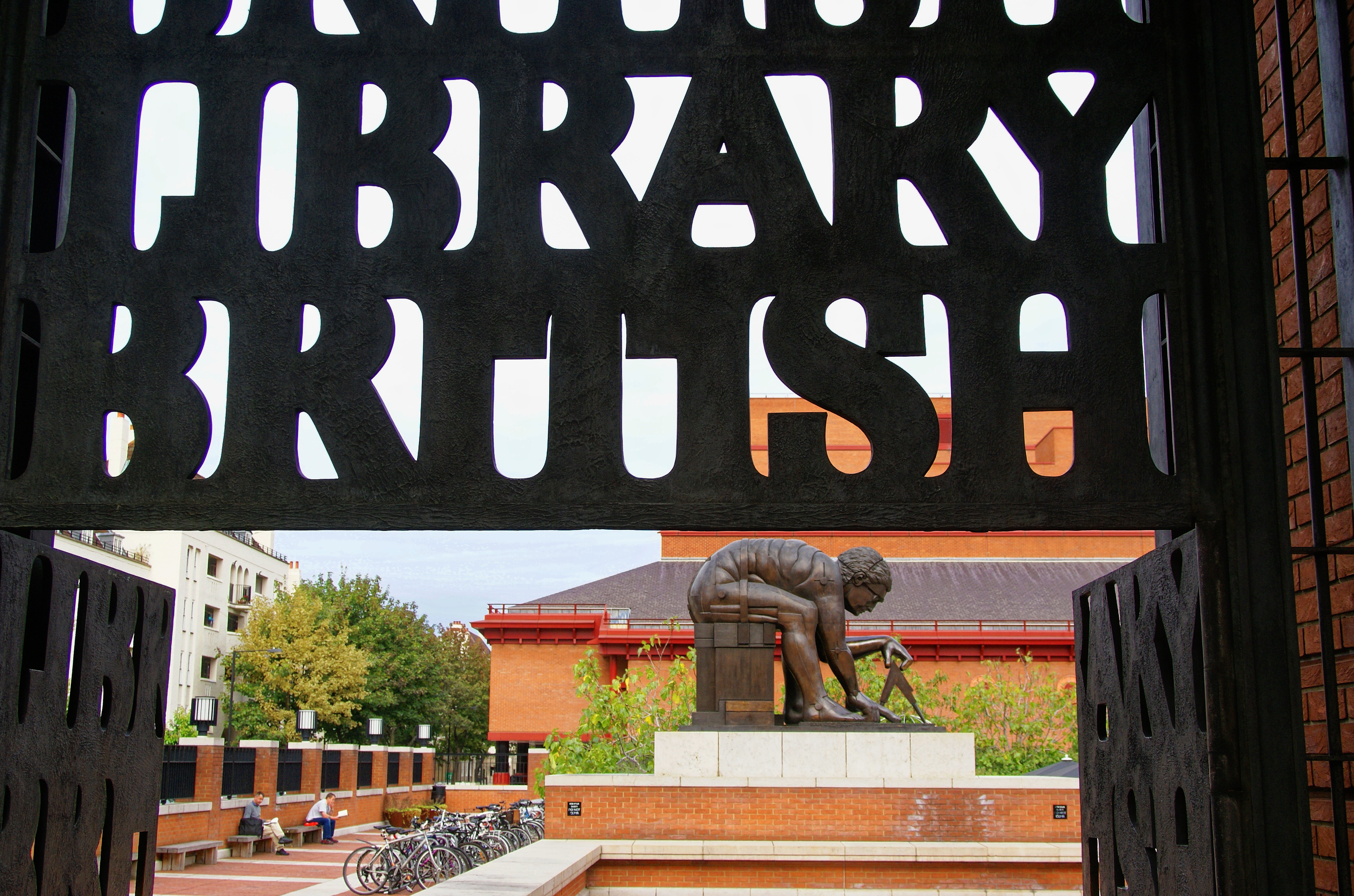
Entrance gate to the British Library on Euston Road, St Pancras, London, looking towards the Newton statue

In October 2023, Rhysida, a hacker group, attacked the online information systems of the British Library. They demanded a ransom of 20 bitcoin, at the time around £596,000, to restore services and return the stolen data. When the British Library did not acquiesce to the demands, Rhysida publicly released approximately 600GB of leaked material online. Services at the library were severely disrupted for months. It has been described as "one of the worst cyber incidents in British history".

The main catalogue returned online on 15 January 2024 in a read-only format and access to the UK Web Archive was partially restored in October 2026, but some of the library's services are expected to remain unavailable for months.

== Background ==
The British Library is a non-departmental public body which in 2023 held around 14 million books, as well as millions of other items. It is the largest library in the United Kingdom. The Library was protected by firewalls and antivirus software but did not have a multi-factor authentication (MFA) policy that covered all organizational assets. The Library had installed a new Terminal Services server in February 2020 to facilitate remote access to third-party providers during the COVID-19 pandemic response; this was the server on which unauthorized access was first detected during the attack. The library had achieved accreditation for the "Cyber Essentials Plus" in 2019; however, in 2022 the accreditation standards changed which made the library non-compliant. In 2020, the Library, in light of the COVID-19 pandemic, implemented MFA, however, a Library report clarified that "...but for reasons of practicality, cost and impact on ongoing Library programmes, it was decided at this time that connectivity to the British Library domain (including machine log-on access and access to on-premise servers) would be out of scope for MFA implementation, pending further renewal of the Library's infrastructure." Due to these circumstances, the Library's servers were vulnerable to attack due to identified increasing third-party cybersecurity risks and a series of emergency decisions to quickly secure their infrastructure while adapting to change due to the COVID-19 pandemic.

Rhysida is a hacker group and "ransomware as a service" provider already known for its attacks on vital infrastructure such as schools, hospitals and government agencies, having become known to intelligence services in May 2023. It had previously attacked the Chilean Army, a medical research lab in Australia, and health-care company Prospect Medical Holdings.

The British Library attack was part of a larger pattern of cyberattacks at this time against cultural institutions. These attacks had previously affected the Metropolitan Opera in New York City and Natural History Museum in Berlin.

== Timeline of events ==
=== 2023 ===
- 28 October: At 9:54 a.m. GMT, The British Library states on Twitter that it is experiencing "technical issues affecting our website". By midmorning, issues include a public Wi-Fi outage and non-functional online catalogue.
- 29 October: The Library announces on Twitter that it is experiencing a "technology outage".
- 30 October: The Library reopens after the weekend "in a pre-digital state", according to The New Yorker. Its website, phone lines, ticket sales, reader registrations, and card transactions are non-functional. Deliveries from the Library's Boston Spa site are put on hold.
- 31 October: The Library confirms publicly that the outage is the consequence of a cyberattack. It launches an investigation alongside the National Cyber Security Centre (NCSC) and other cybersecurity specialists.
- 16 November: An attempt at digital extortion, also known as a ransomware attack, is confirmed by the Library.
- 20 November: Rhysida claims responsibility for the breach and launches a week-long auction for 490,191 files of data on the dark web, opening bidding at 20 bitcoin, at the time equivalent to about £596,000, for a single buyer. It sets the auction deadline to 8 a.m. GMT on 27 November and advertises it with low-resolution images which appear to show HM Revenue and Customs documents, employment contracts and passport information. It claims the data is "exclusive, unique and impressive". The Library states that the leaked data appears to be from its internal human resources files.
- 27 November: Rhysida makes 90 percent of the stolen data, approximately 600GB, freely available for anyone on the dark web to download after the British Library refuses to pay the ransom.

=== 2024 ===
- 5 January: The Financial Times reports that the Library would use around 40 percent of its financial reserves to recover from the attack, estimated at around £6–7 million.
- 10 January: The Library announces that some of its services will return online from 15 January, with access stated by Roly Keating, chief executive of the Library, to be "slower and more manual" than before the attack. Keating apologises that "for the past two months researchers who rely for their studies and in some cases for their livelihoods on access to the library's collection have been deprived of it".
- 15 January: The British Library's main online catalogue is restored in a read-only format. Users are able to search the main catalogue, but the process of checking availability and ordering items is different. Access to key special collections is restored but for in-person visits only.
- 8 March: Roly Keating authors a blog post to the British Library website announcing the availability of a report that "gives a description and timeline of the attack, to the best of our current understanding, and its implications for the Library’s operations, future infrastructure and risk assessment." The report announced that it was undertaking a "Rebuild & Renew" scheme "to ensure its future ability to respond to incidents of a similar scale in a consistent and structured way", including a "considerable shift" away from on-site technologies and onto the cloud.
- 30 July: Library announces that remote ordering of physical media for delivery to the Reading Rooms will be available by September 2024. Digital versions of historically significant manuscripts will be re-released incrementally beginning in September, based on a "prioritised list of manuscripts based on criteria including the items that were most requested prior to the cyber-attack and items to which Reading Room access is restricted." Educational websites, and digital academic journals, will also be restored before the academic year 2024–25, to the extent possible. Digital ordering of items in the Automated Storage Building is expected to go back online in August 2024.

=== 2025 ===
- The Information Commissioner's Office (ICO) announced that it would not pursue an investigation of the Library over the attack. It cited its current priorities and said that investigating further would not be the best use of its resources. The ICO praised the Library for its openness about the weaknesses in its systems that had contributed to the incident. The Library's security failings had included an administrator account without multi-factor authentication.
- Access to the library collection was halted between 1 December to 7 December to allow for a LMS changeover to the Ex Libris software Alma.
- Following the changeover a new online catalogue interface was made available on the 8th December for requests.
- As of 1 November, services are still heavily affected. Many services at the library are still unavailable, including ebooks, its archives and manuscripts catalogue, and online journal articles.

=== 2026 ===
- 8 July: Access to the E-Theses Online Service (EThOS) is restored, with an additional 14,000 theses added since it was taken offline.
- 28 October: Access to UK Web Archive is partially restored.

== Attack methods ==
The Library stated that the attackers probably used a phishing, spear-phishing or brute-force attack facilitated by a compromise of third-party credentials as well as a lack of use of multi-factor authentication by third-party contractors. After gaining access, Rhysida used three methods to identify and copy the 600GB of documents during the attack, including personal details of Library users and staff. These were:

1. A targeted attack that copied full sections of network drives of the Library's Finance, Technology and People teams, which made up 60% of all content copied.
2. A keyword attack which scanned for files and folders that used sensitive keywords in their names, including 'passport' or 'confidential', which constituted 40% of the copied data and included files from corporate networks and personal drives used by staff.
3. A hijacking of native utilities, which were then used to forcibly create backup copies of 22 databases of data including contact details of external users and customers.

Furthermore, Rhysida and its affiliates destroyed servers to inhibit system recovery and forensic analysis.

== Impact ==
While the process of calculating the full financial impact of the attack is ongoing, there were a number of impacts to the functioning of the library following the attack. These include:

- Library items from its Boston Spa branch could not be transferred to the London site.
- Around 20,000 writers, illustrators and translators who usually received Public Lending Right payments from borrowed books had their payments delayed.
- The Library's 2024–25 visiting fellowship programme was suspended.
- The computerised catalogue was offline for months, with partial restoration in January 2024.
- The EThOS collection of British doctoral theses remained offline as of 19 December 2023. It returned to functionality on 8 July 2026.
- An estimated £6–7 million in costs to recover from the attack.
- As of 4 November 2024, British Library electronic resources web pages redirect to a page with the statement, "We're continuing to experience a major technology outage as a result of a cyber-attack. Our buildings are open as usual, however, the outage is still affecting our website, online systems and services, as well as some onsite services. This is a temporary website, with limited content, which outlines the services that are currently available, as well as what's on at the Library."
- Electronic Legal Deposit (NPLD) remained unavailable in the British Library Reading Rooms until summer 2026. The other five legal deposit libraries (National Libraries of Wales and Scotland, the Bodleian Libraries, Cambridge University Library and the Library of Trinity College Dublin) provided access to material deposited before October 2023 via an interim platform, which could be used onsite in their reading rooms. British Library Readers could apply for free Reader Passes to access this content onsite at one of these libraries.

== See also ==
- WannaCry ransomware attack
- Internet Archive cyberattack
