= Lisa Campbell =

Lisa Campbell may refer to:

- Lisa Campbell (badminton), Australian badminton player
- Lisa Campbell (civil servant), Canadian lawyer and civil servant
- Lisa Campbell (politician), American politician from Georgia

== See also ==
- Elizabeth Campbell (disambiguation)
- Liza Campbell, Scottish artist and writer
