= E-Theses Online Service =

Bibliographic database of electronic theses

E-Theses Online Service: EThOS
- Website type: Bibliographic database
- Available in: English
- Owner: British Library
- Website: ethos.bl.uk
- Registration: Optional
- Launched: 2009; 17 years ago
- Current status: Online

E-Theses Online Service (EThOS) is a bibliographic database and union catalogue of electronic theses provided by the British Library, the National Library of the United Kingdom. As of July 2026 EThOS provides access to over 650,000 doctoral theses awarded by over 140 UK higher education institutions, with around 3,000 new thesis records added every month. The service was taken offline for three years from 2023 to 2026 following the British Library cyberattack.

== EThOS services ==
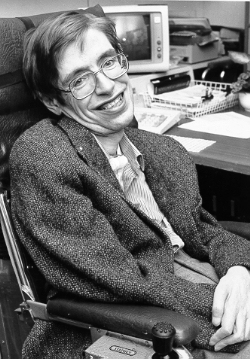
Stephen Hawking's highly viewed 1966 thesis Properties of expanding universes is indexed by EThOS.

Nobel laureate Dorothy Hodgkin's 1937 thesis X-ray crystallography and the chemistry of the sterols is indexed by EThOS

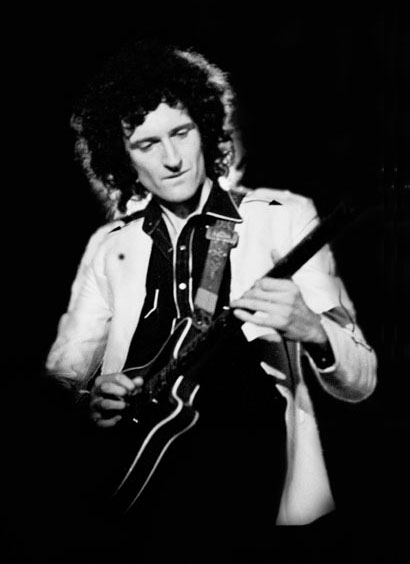
Brian May's 2007 thesis A survey of radial velocities in the zodiacal dust cloud is indexed by EThOS.

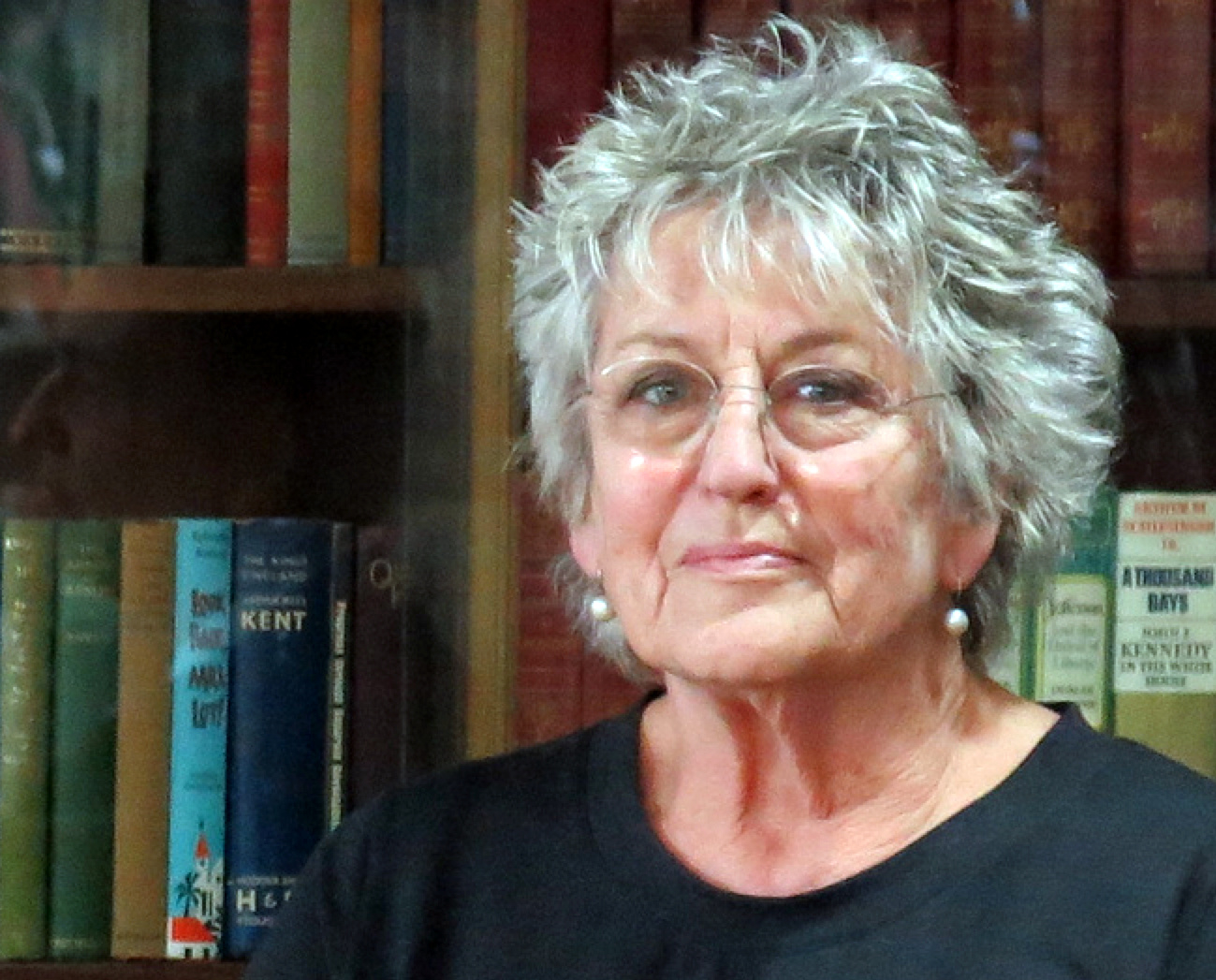
Germaine Greer's 1968 thesis The ethic of love and marriage in Shakespeare's early comedies is indexed by EThOS.

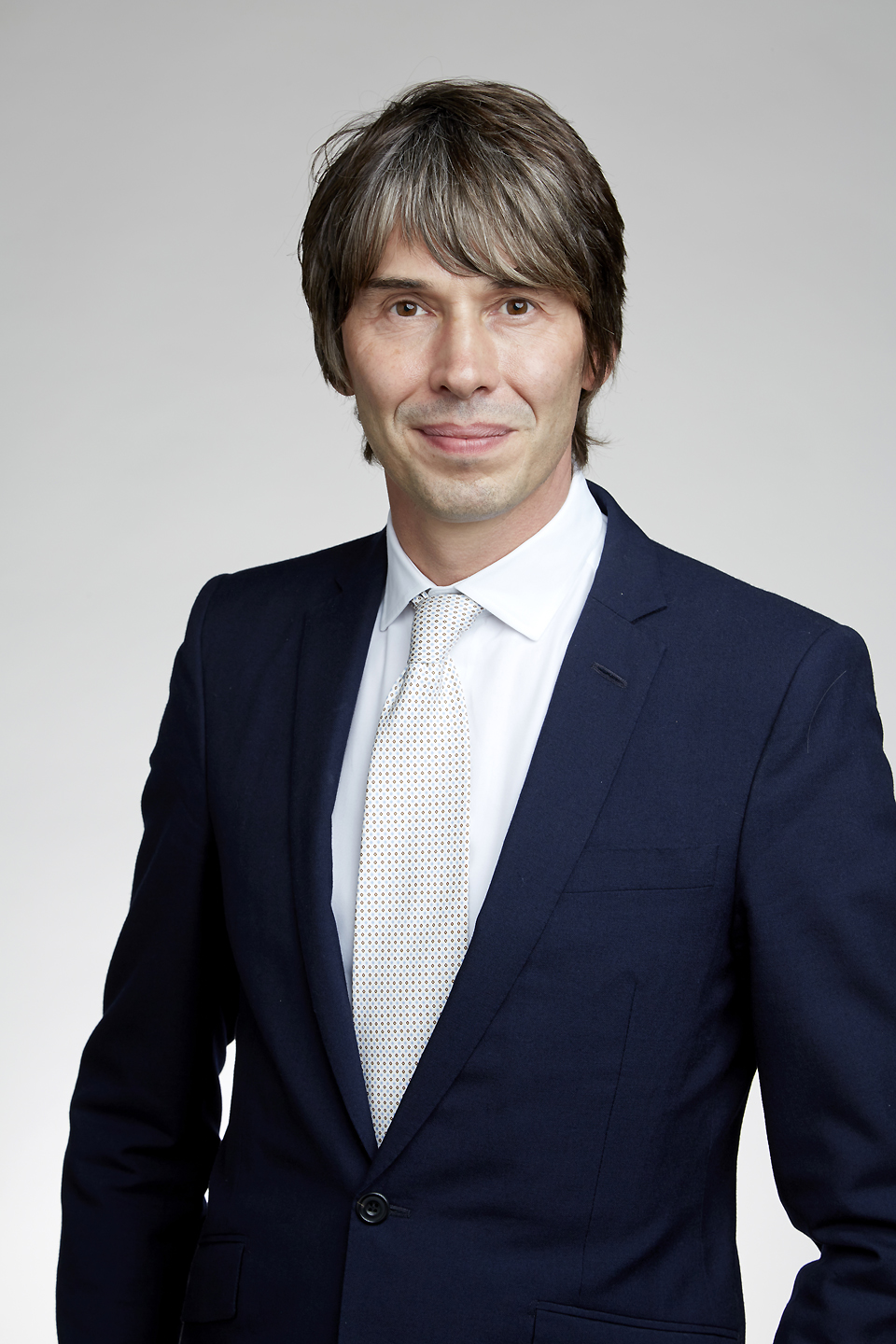
Brian Cox's 1998 thesis Double diffraction dissociation at large momentum transfer is indexed by EThOS.

EThOS records thesis data and metadata which can then be searched with basic and advanced search terms.

=== Data recorded in EThOS ===
Theses indexed by EThOS have a minimum of a thesis title, author, awarding body and date. Optional additional metadata may be included such as the thesis abstract, doctoral advisor, sponsor, cross links to other databases and the full text of the thesis itself.

As of September 2017 the EThOS website gives open access to the full text of around 160,000 UK doctoral theses that have been digitised. Theses can be accessed by freely registering for then logging into EThOS. Open access is also provided by links to the Institutional repository of the awarding body. Since 2015, EThOS has integrated authority control and other unique identifiers including:

- The author's ORCID identifier..
- The International Standard Name Identifier (ISNI).
- The Handle System.
- Digital Object Identifiers (DOIs).

Some thesis records include the name of the doctoral advisor.

Doctoral advisor metadata can be used in academic genealogies like academictree.org, Wikidata and the Mathematics Genealogy Project. Academic genealogies in Wikidata are built using the doctoral advisor relation (Property:P184).

=== Searching EThOS metadata ===
Where present, metadata can be used as search criteria. So for example, in addition to a basic search, an advanced search facility allows users to search for theses by publication year, awarding body, author's given name, surname, thesis title, doctoral advisor and various other metadata. Data in EThOS can also be accessed programmatically (by machines) using the Protocol for Metadata Harvesting (PMH) from the Open Archives Initiative (OAI), DataCite and its Application Programming Interface (API).

=== Types of thesis included ===
As well as indexing Doctor of Philosophy theses, EThOS holds records of other kinds of doctorates including:

- Doctor of Medicine (MD) theses, for example Pensée Wu's thesis.
- Doctor of Science (ScD or DSc) theses, for example Else Bartels thesis.
- Doctor of Engineering (EngD or DEng) theses, for example Chris Dighton's thesis.
- Doctor of Professional Studies (ProfD or DProf) theses, for example Andreas Georgiou's thesis.
- Doctor of Music (MusD or DMus) and Doctor of Musical Arts (DMA) theses, for example Evaristo Lopez thesis.
- Doctor of Education (EdD or DEd) theses, for example Mary Greaves thesis.
- Doctor of Philosophy (PhD or DPhil) by prior publication in peer reviewed journals, for example Jill Steward's thesis.
- Doctor of Philosophy in creative writing, for example Sally O'Reilly's thesis.

Master's degree theses such as Master of Philosophy (MPhil), Master of Research (MRes), Master of Science (MSc) and Master of Arts (MA) theses are not indexed by EThoS. Honorary degrees are also not included as there is usually no actual written thesis.

=== Development and contact ===
EThOS was developed in partnership with Higher Education Institutions (HEIs) around the UK with funding from Research Libraries UK (RLUK) and Jisc (formerly the Joint Information Systems Committee) and was launched in January 2009. EThOS staff at the British Library can be contacted during office hours on email, Twitter and in person at the British Library.

== Availability ==
EThOS was taken offline by the British Library cyberattack and became unavailable in December 2023.

By 2026, there were plans to restore downloads and on-demand digitization "later [that year]", as well as an interim platform running solely on the platform's metadata. The lack of progress on restoring EThOS has been criticised by Martin Paul Eve, who said that the interim platform lacked the centralisation central to EThOS and that the British Library had not prioritised restoration.

As of July 2026 the service is back online.
