= Upland Baptist Church =

Historic church in Pennsylvania

Coordinates: 39.853258°N 75.382175°W

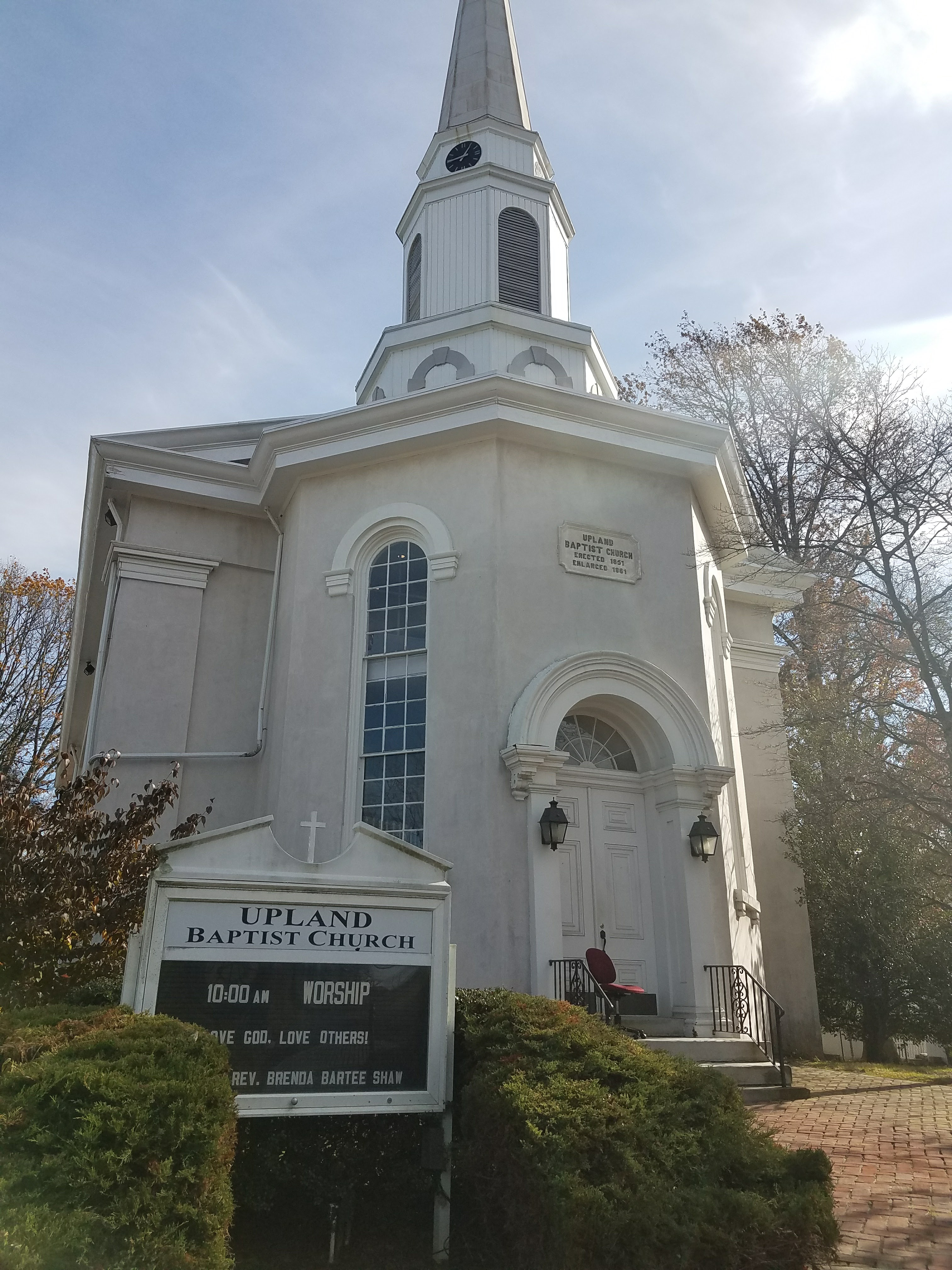
Upland Baptist Church

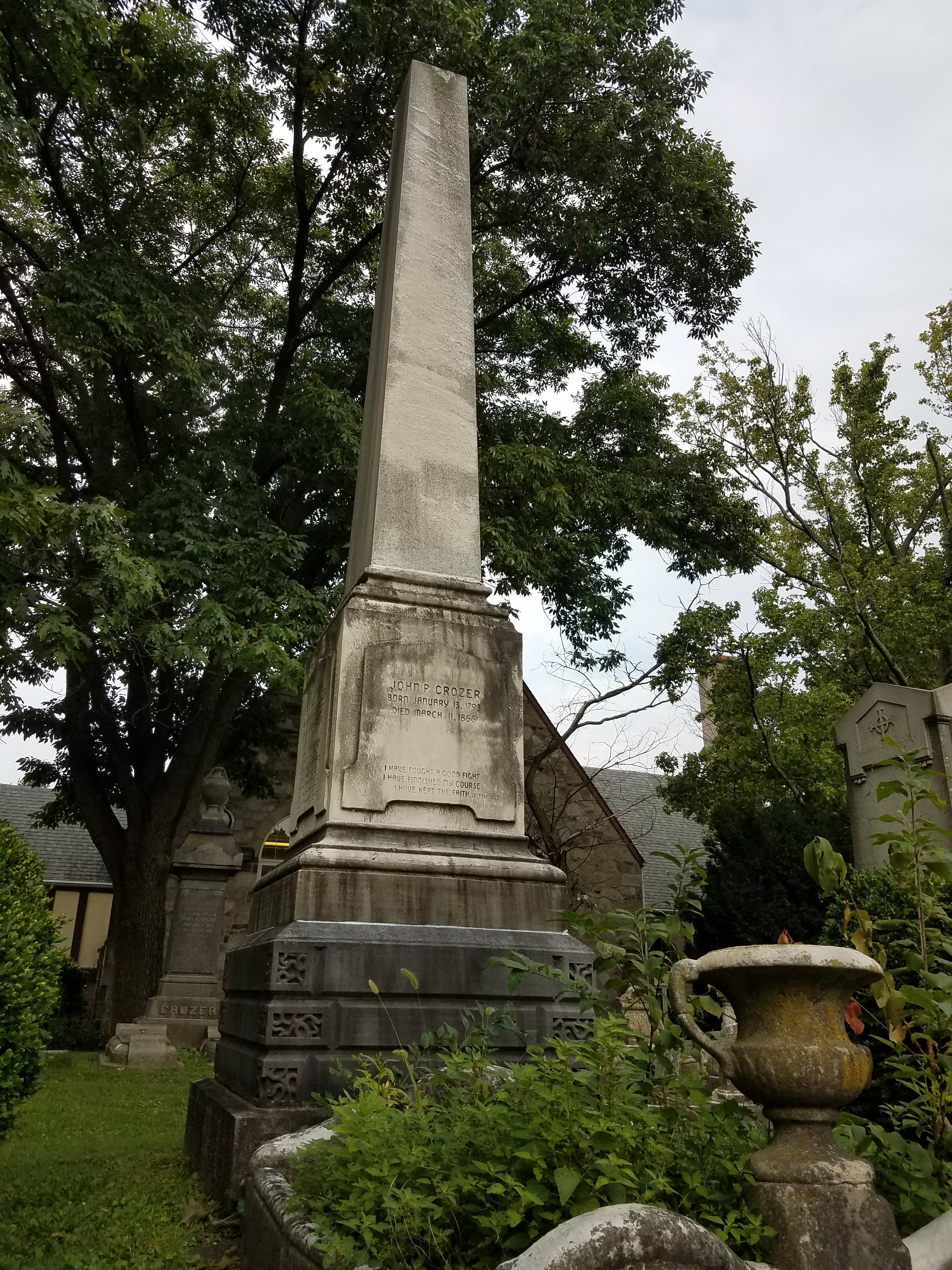
John Price Crozer's grave at Upland Baptist Church

Upland Baptist Church is a Baptist church built in 1851 in Upland, Pennsylvania.

== History ==
John Price Crozer, a textile manufacturer and philanthropist from Upland, funded the construction of the church in 1851. Construction was completed and the church was dedicated in 1852.

William Bucknell, businessman and benefactor to Bucknell University, was a generous donor to the church.

Further improvements to the church were made in 1886 with the addition of a chapel, classrooms and a large recreation room.

Upland Baptist church established chapels at Leiperville and Bridgewater and was involved in organizing the Village Green and South Chester churches.

On February 1, 1955, a fire caused severe damage to the chapel.

== Notable burials ==
- John Price Crozer (1793–1866), textile manufacturer, banker, and philanthropist
