= Rhysida (hacker group) =

Hacker group using ransomware

Rhysida is a ransomware group that encrypts data on victims' computer systems and threatens to make it publicly available unless a ransom is paid. The group uses eponymous ransomware-as-a-service techniques, targets large organisations rather than making random attacks on individuals, and demands large sums of money to restore data.

The group perpetrated the notable 2023 British Library cyberattack and Insomniac Games data dump. It has targeted many organisations, including some in the US healthcare sector, and the Chilean army.

In November 2023, the US agencies Cybersecurity and Infrastructure Security Agency (CISA), FBI and MS-ISAC published an alert about the Rhysida ransomware and the actors behind it, with information about the techniques the ransomware uses to infiltrate targets and its mode of operation.

The group takes its name from the genus of centipedes, and uses a centipede logo. Their location is unknown, but authorities believe the group to be based in Russia or multiple Russian-speaking countries, as comments found within their malware's code are written in Russian.

== Attacks ==
- Chilean army, June 2023
- British Library cyberattack, October 2023
- Insomniac Games data dump, December 2023, releasing details of the Marvel's Wolverine game and employee details
- Prospect Medical Holdings, August 2023
- City of Columbus, Ohio, July 2024, where over 3 TB of data was released onto the dark web, after an attempt to extort $1.7M (30 Bitcoin) from the city.
- Seattle-Tacoma International Airport, August 2024; in April 2025 the Port of Seattle began notifying about 90,000 people that their personal information had been stolen in the attack.
- Ranney School, August 2024
- Rutherford County Schools (Tennessee), November 2024
- Pembina Trails School Division, December 2024
- Oregon Department of Environmental Quality, April 2025, where the group released 1.3 million files (2.4 terabytes) on the dark web
- Maryland Department of Transportation, September 2025
- Stelia Aerospace, April 2026
- Berlin state administration, August 2026

== Ransomware as a service ==
The US CISA report states:

Threat actors leveraging Rhysida ransomware are known to impact "targets of opportunity", including victims in the education, healthcare, manufacturing, information technology, and government sectors. Open source reporting details similarities between Vice Society (DEV-0832) activity and the actors observed deploying Rhysida ransomware. Additionally, open source reporting has confirmed observed instances of Rhysida actors operating in a ransomware-as-a-service (RaaS) capacity, where ransomware tools and infrastructure are leased out in a profit-sharing model. Any ransoms paid are then split between the group and the affiliates.
