= Herbert W. Briggs =

American lawyer (1900-1990)

Herbert Whittaker Briggs (May 14, 1900 – January 6, 1990) was an American lawyer and professor at Cornell University, known for his work on international law.

== Early life ==
Briggs was born in Wilmington, Delaware, on May 14, 1900, to Frederic F. Briggs and Eleanore A. Briggs (née Lewis), a grand-niece of manufacturer and philanthropist John Price Crozer. In 1912, his mother received a moderate inheritance that the family spent on a tour of Europe, sparking his interest in international law. In 1921, Briggs was awarded a Bachelor of Arts from West Virginia University. This was followed by doctoral studies at Johns Hopkins University; he received his Ph.D. in 1925.

== Career ==
Briggs worked as a lecturer at Oberlin College before moving to Cornell University in 1929 where he would teach for the following forty years as its Goldwin Smith Professor of International Law. He founded Cornell's Department of Political Science and held a visiting professorship at the University of Copenhagen as part of the Fulbright Program.

Briggs had an impact on the international stage. He was a member of the International Law Commission between 1962 and 1966, represented Honduras, Spain, and Libya in litigation before the International Court of Justice, and represented the United States for the Vienna Convention on the Law of Treaties. He was highly active as an international arbitrator, such as his mediation of negotiations that set the France–United Kingdom border during the 1970s.

== Memberships ==
Briggs was a member of the Institut de Droit International and was active in the American Society of International Law, presiding as its president from 1959 to 1960. He was co-editor of the American Journal of International Law from 1939 onward and its editor-in-chief from 1955 to 1962. In 1970, Briggs was elected to the American Academy of Arts and Sciences.

== Publications ==
- The Doctrine of Continuous Voyage. Johns Hopkins University Press, Baltimore 1926.
- The Law of Nations: Cases, Documents, and Notes. Crofts, New York 1938.
- The International Law Commission. Cornell University Press, Ithaca 1969.
