= Beth Campbell =

Beth Campbell may refer to:

- Beth Campbell (artist) (born 1971), American artist
- Beth Campbell (musician) in Atlas (band)
- Beth Campbell (jurist), magistrate of the Australian Capital Territory
- Beth Newlands Campbell, president of Rexall Drugstore
- Beth Campbell Short (1908 – 1988), American journalist

== See also ==
- Bethany Campbell, writer
- Elizabeth Campbell (disambiguation)
