= Noble Health Alliance =

Consortium of health systems in Pennsylvania

Noble Health Alliance, LLC
- Formerly: Pennsylvania Health Alliance
- Company type: Private
- Industry: Healthcare administration
- Founded: 2013
- Headquarters: Fort Washington, Pennsylvania
- Area served: Pennsylvania, United States
- Key people: Patrick R. Young (Chairman and CEO); Susan Williams (Chief Medical Officer)
- Website: noblehealthalliance.com - redirects to advertising

Noble Health Alliance was a partnership of four Pennsylvania health systems, formed to address coordination of care and regional population health for their collective group of employees as well as enable administrative efficiency among the partners. Formed in 2013 as a limited liability company, Noble was originally known as Pennsylvania Health Alliance and changed its name in 2014. As of March 2015, the four partners are Crozer-Keystone Health System, Abington Health, Aria Health and Einstein Healthcare Network.

== Corporate governance ==
Noble's Executive Chairman and Chief Executive Officer is Patrick R. Young, named in April 2014; Young previously worked as an executive with Aetna. Quality management among alliance physicians is coordinated by a "physician executive council" with members from each of the alliance partners.

As of January 1, 2017, Noble Health Alliance will be dissolved. Crozier has declared bankruptcy, and the other three partners have merged with Jefferson Health.
