= Southern California Hospital at Culver City =

Coordinates: 34°01′22″N 118°23′51″W

- Prospect Medical Holdings

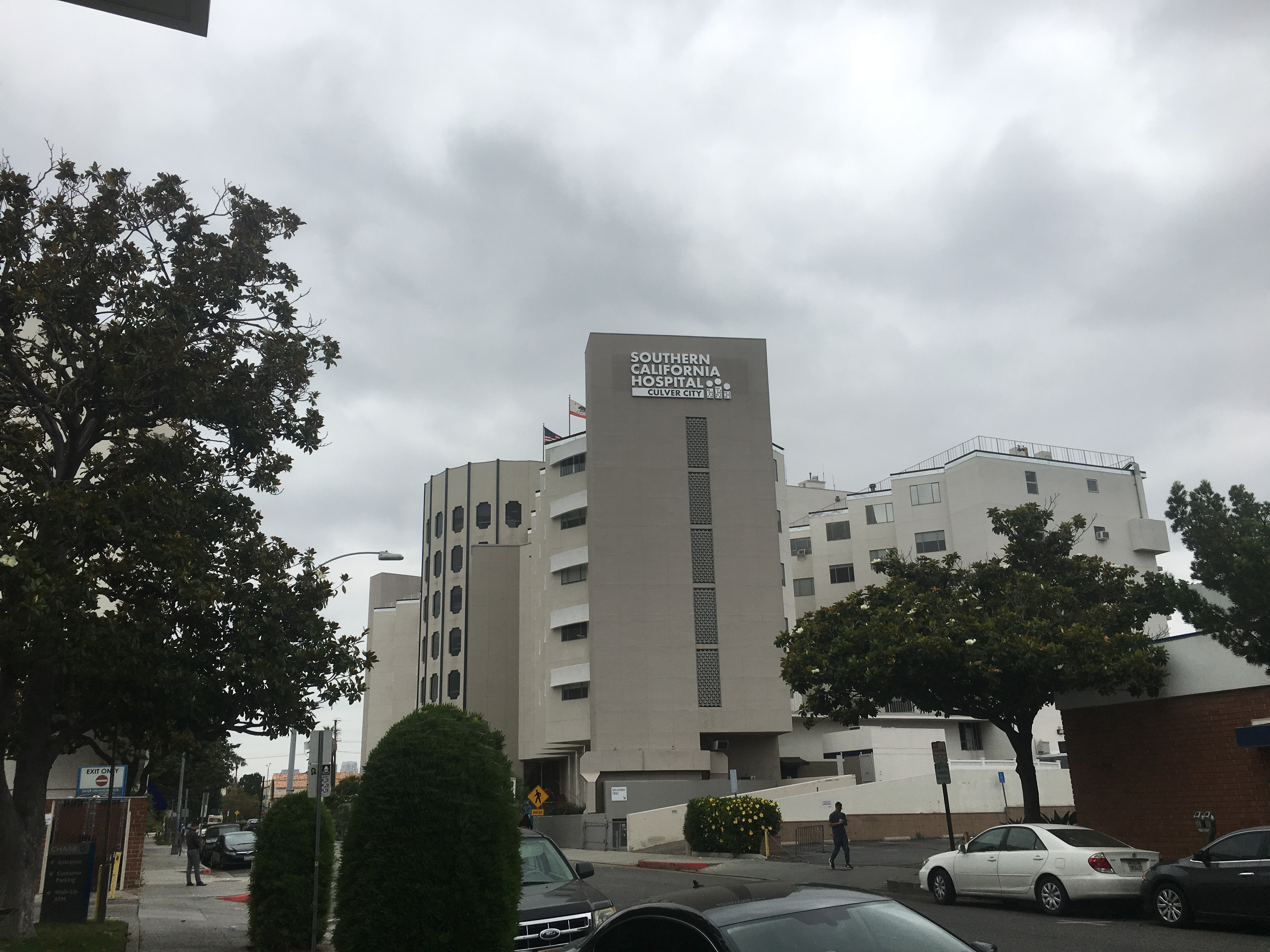
- Southern California Hospital at Culver City, July 2019

Geography
- Location: Culver City, California, United States

Organization
- Care system: Private
- Type: Community
- Affiliated university: None

Services
- Emergency department: Basic, physician on duty
- Beds: 420

History
- Founded: 1924

Links
- Website: https://sch-culvercity.com//
- Lists: Hospitals in California

Southern California Hospital at Culver City is an acute care hospital in Culver City, California. It is located in the downtown area of Culver City, and serves West Los Angeles, providing 24-hour medical services. The hospital is home to the Southern California Hospital Heart Institute.

The hospital has expanded from its original eight-bed clinic to 420 beds in three buildings.

== History ==
Southern California Hospital was founded in 1925 by Dr. Foster Hull. In the 1970s, it became the David Brotman Memorial Hospital. In 1984, Michael Jackson was admitted to the hospital due to a serious burn that occurred during a shoot for a Pepsi TV ad. He gave his insurance payment to the hospital and, later that year, the care unit for burn survivors was named the "Michael Jackson Burn Center". It closed in August 1987 due to financial problems.

The hospital re-opened in 2005, having been bought by Prospect Medical Holdings, and was re-named Southern California Hospital.

On January 12, 2025, Prospect Medical filed for Chapter 11 bankruptcy protection, listing assets of $1 billion and liabilities of $10 billion. The company had struggled with rising debt and interest costs. In March 2026, the hospital was sold to NOR Healthcare Systems Corp. for an undisclosed amount.

== Notable employees ==
- Tom Araya, bassist and vocalist for the American thrash metal band Slayer, worked there as a respiratory therapist in the early 1980s.
