= Elizabeth Campbell =

Elizabeth Campbell may refer to:

- Betty Campbell (1934–2017), Welsh schoolteacher
- Elizabeth Campbell (television) (1902–2004), American public television pioneer
- Elizabeth Campbell, 1st Baroness Hamilton of Hameldon (1733–1790), Irish belle and society hostess
- Elizabeth Campbell, Duchess of Argyll (1824–1878), Mistress of the Robes to Queen Victoria
- Elizabeth Macquarie (1778–1835), née Campbell, wife of Lachlan Macquarie, governor of New South Wales
- Elizabeth Henry Campbell Russell (1749–1825)
- Elizabeth Murray Campbell Smith Inman (1726–1785), American shopkeeper, teacher, philanthropist and proto-feminist
- Liza Campbell (Lady Elizabeth Campbell, born 1959), artist
- Elizabeth Campbell, a character in The General's Daughter
- Elizabeth Campbell (poet) (born 1980), Australian poet
- Elizabeth (Bessie) Campbell (1870–1964), Australian banjo player
- Elizabeth Crozer Campbell (1893–1971), American archeologist
- Elizabeth Campbell (psychologist), Scottish clinical psychologist
- Elizabeth Campbell, Marchioness of Breadalbane (1803–1861)
- Elizabeth Duncan Campbell (1804–1878), Scottish poet and autobiographical writer
- Elizabeth Campbell Winter (1841–1922), née Campbell, American actress and novelist
- Elizabeth Crozer Campbell (1893–1971), American archeologist

== See also ==
- Beth Campbell (disambiguation)
- Campbell (surname)
