= Prospect Medical Holdings =

US healthcare system

- Type: Private
- Industry: Healthcare
- Founded: 1996; 30 years ago in California, US
- Headquarters: Los Angeles, US
- Number of locations: 16 hospitals (2024)
- Area served: California; Connecticut; New Jersey; Pennsylvania; Rhode Island
- Key people: Von Crockett (Co-CEO); David Topper (Co-CEO); Mitchel Lew, M.D. (President)
- Services: Hospital operation
- Number of employees: 18,000 (2024)
- Subsidiaries: CharterCARE; Crozer Health; Eastern Connecticut Health Network
- Website: www.pmh.com

Prospect Medical Holdings is a private healthcare company based in Los Angeles, California which operates 16 hospitals in the United States, mainly in California and the Northeastern United States.

The company was founded in 1996, expanded into full hospital operations in 2007, and filed for bankruptcy in 2025.

== History ==
Prospect was founded in 1996 by a group of physicians in California. In 2010, private equity firm Leonard Green & Partners (LGP) acquired a 61.3% stake in Prospect in a $363 million leveraged buyout.

Amid the hospital system's fiscal troubles, Leonard Green attempted twice to sell the company in 2015 and 2018, but failed due to the company's poor financials. Prospect then initiated a $1.31 billion dividend recapitalization, which allowed it to refinance its debt and landed Leonard Green $658.4 million in dividends and management fees.

In 2019, Prospect sold its California, Connecticut, and Pennsylvania hospital real estate to Medical Properties Trust (MPT), a healthcare real estate investment trust, for $1.386 billion in order to pay off debt. However, this sale-leaseback transaction stuck Prospect's hospitals with triple-net leases, requiring that the hospitals pay rent, property taxes, and maintenance on the properties.

In 2021, Leonard Green once again attempted to sell the chain, this time aiming to sell to Prospect's other part-owners, David Topper and Sam Lee. Approval for LGP's attempted sale was held up by the Rhode Island attorney general, who, given the dire financial situation LGP was leaving the health system in, conditioned its approval on LGP placing $120-150 million in escrow to back up its two fiscally strained hospitals in the state. In response to the AG's conditions, LGP threatened to shut down the hospitals. The pressure of potential loss of healthcare services led the AG to lower the escrow obligation to $80 million while also requiring LGP to commit over $30 million to the system during the transition.

Also in 2021, Prospect and Yale New Haven Health (YNHH) began talks aimed at a sale of Prospect's three Connecticut hospitals to YNHH. The two companies in 2022 signed a $435 million agreement for the transfer of Waterbury Hospital, Manchester Memorial Hospital, and Rockville General Hospital. However, following a high-profile six-week cyberattack in 2023 by hacker group Rhysida against Prospect, YNHH began to raise concerns about Prospect's financial difficulties. These troubles were only worsened by the cyberattack, and led to a $7 million bailout by the state to keep the hospitals running. Problems included stalled Medicaid payments resulting from the attack, as well as deteriorating maintenance conditions at the hospitals and overdue bills to outside vendors. As a result, YNHH proposed a "Recovery Plan," wherein Prospect would lower the purchase price in exchange for YNHH providing immediate managerial support in the wake of the attack. The deal would also require financial support from the state. The state indicated its support for the new plan in March 2024, however YNHH sued Prospect in May to terminate the deal, stating that Prospect violated their 2022 purchase agreement by failing to make rent payments on the hospitals, not paying their taxes, and driving away physicians and vendors. Prospect responded through a countersuit, alleging that YNHH deliberately stalled the closing of the deal in order to lower their monetary commitment.

On January 12, 2025, Prospect Medical filed for Chapter 11 bankruptcy protection, listing assets and liabilities between $1 billion and $10 billion. The company struggled with rising interest costs and high debt. The Atlanta-based Centurion Foundation completed its purchase of the Roger Williams Medical Center and Our Lady of Fatima Hospital in Rhode Island, which Prospect had bought from CharterCARE in 2014.

== Hospitals ==
- California
  - Bellflower Behavioral Health Hospital
  - Foothill Regional Medical Center
  - Los Angeles Community Hospital
  - Norwalk Community Hospital
  - Southern California Hospital at Culver City
  - Southern California Hospital at Hollywood
  - Van Nuys Behavioral Health Hospital
- Connecticut
  - Eastern Connecticut Health Network
    - Manchester Memorial Hospital
    - Rockville General Hospital
  - WaterburyHEALTH
- Pennsylvania
  - Crozer Health
    - Crozer-Chester Medical Center
    - Delaware County Memorial Hospital
    - Springfield Hospital
    - Taylor Hospital
