= Environmental Archaeology =

Journal

- Discipline: Archaeology
- Language: English
- Edited by: Tim Mighall

Publication details
- History: 1996–present
- Publisher: Maney Publishing
- Frequency: Biannually
- Impact factor: 1.475 (2019)

Standard abbreviations
- ISO 4: Environ. Archaeol.

Indexing
- ISSN: 1461-4103 (print); 1749-6314 (web)

Links
- Journal homepage

Environmental Archaeology is an academic journal published by Maney Publishing on behalf of the Association for Environmental Archaeology.

The journal was established in 1996. It is edited by Dr. Tim Mighall of the University of Aberdeen.
