= Crozer Arboretum =

Arboretum and garden park in Upland, Pennsylvania

Coordinates: 39.85711°N 75.36870°W

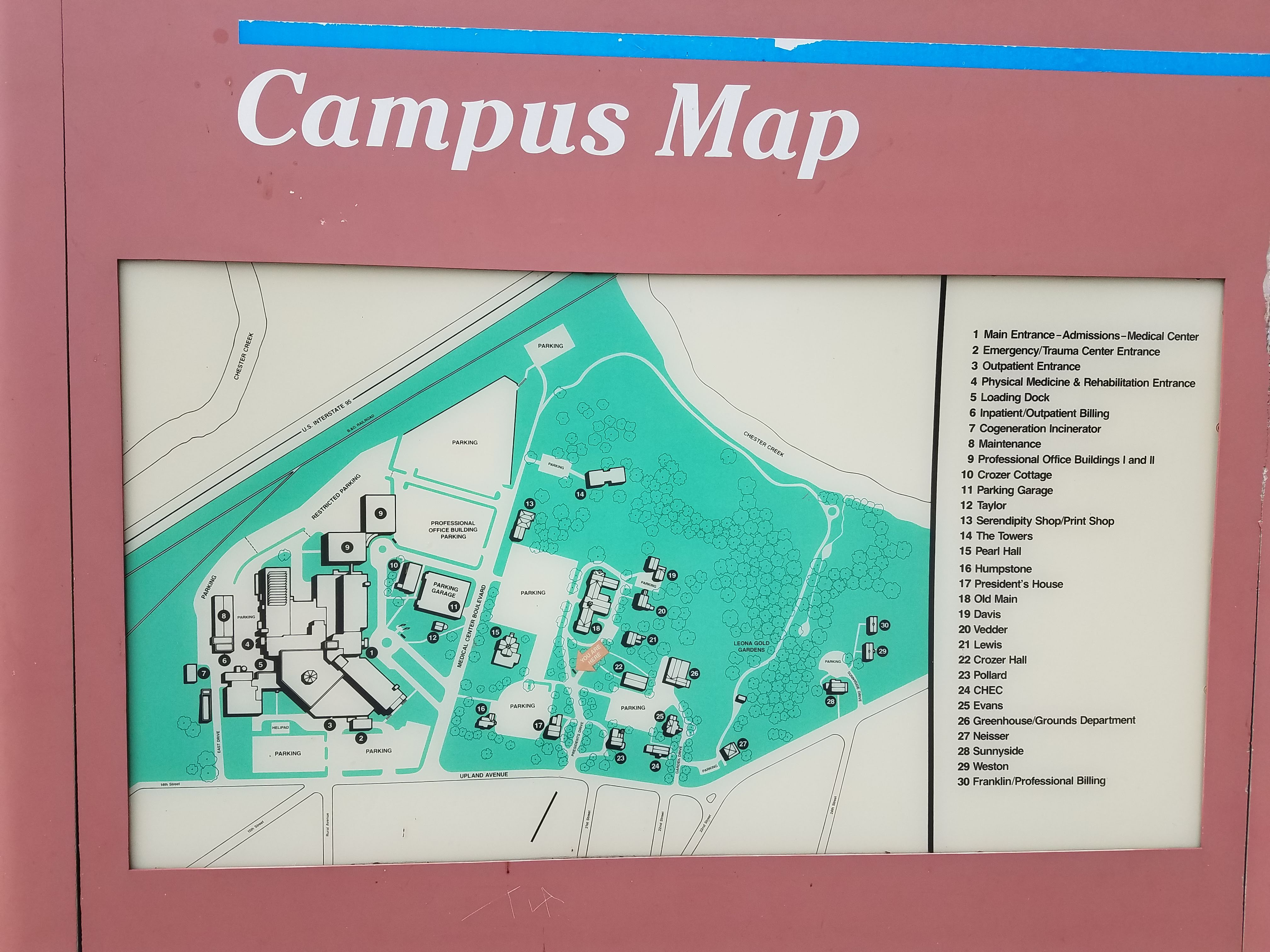
Crozer Chester Medical Center Campus Map

Crozer Arboretum, now the Crozer Garden, is a 12-acre (49,000 m^{2}) arboretum and garden park located at 1 Medical Center Boulevard, Upland, Pennsylvania. The grounds are open daily; admission is free.

The park was formerly the campus of the Crozer Theological Seminary, the buildings of the seminary are currently used as office space by the Crozer-Chester Medical Center. The arboretum features large specimen trees dating from the mid-19th century, more than 1,400 rhododendrons, native herbaceous plants and shrubs, lawns, two ponds, natural springs, and walkways. The campus also features the 10-acre (40,000 m^{2}) Leona Gold Garden and Crozer Greenhouse.

== See also ==
- List of botanical gardens in the United States
