= Crozer Theological Seminary =

- Old Main
- U.S. National Register of Historic Places
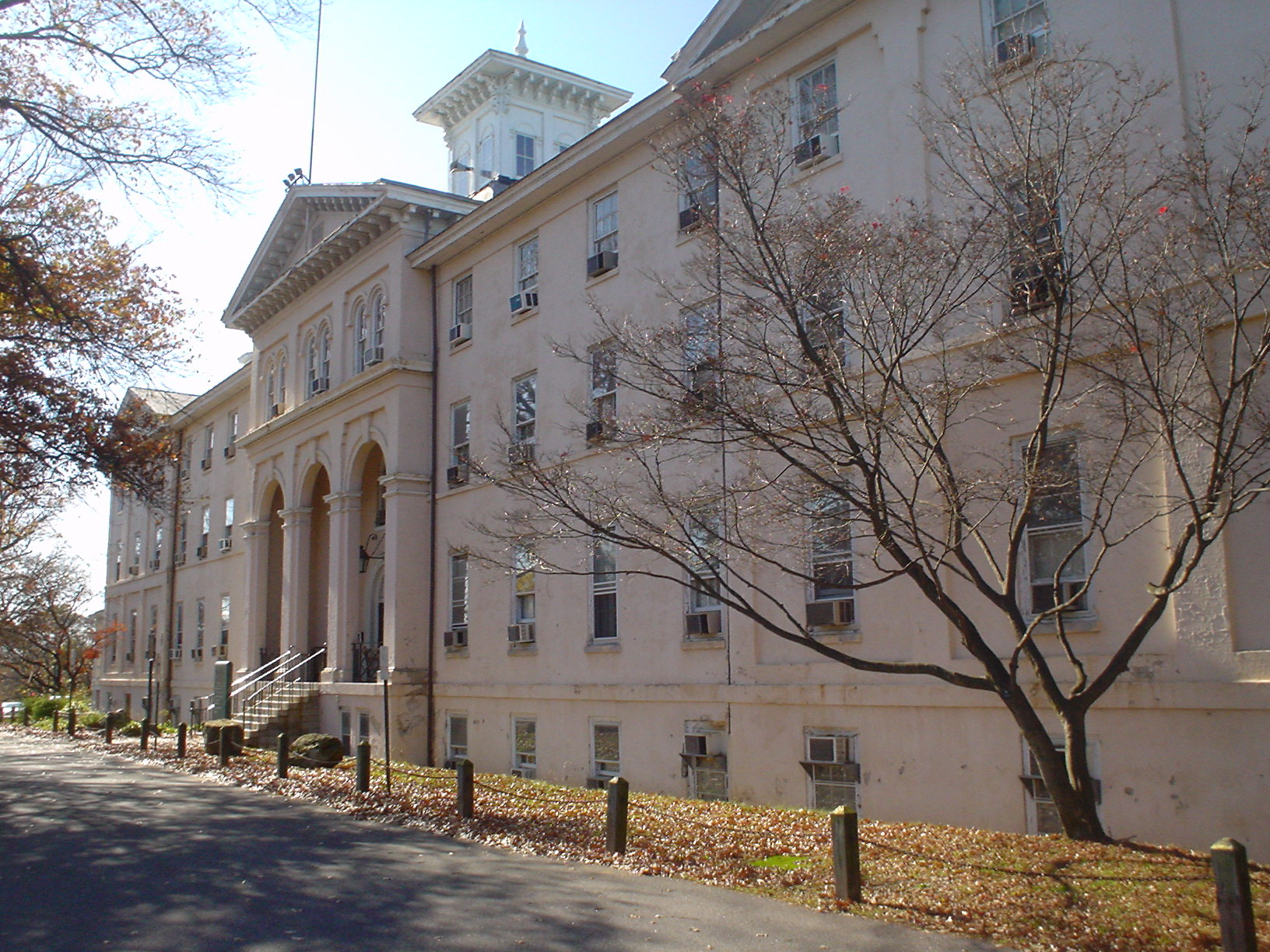
- Old Main Building, Upland, Pennsylvania, November 2009

- Location within Pennsylvania Location within the United States
- Location: 21st St. and Upland Ave., Upland, Pennsylvania
- Coordinates: 39°51′21″N 75°22′17″W
- Area: 1 acre (0.40 ha)
- Built: 1857
- Architectural style: Italianate
- NRHP reference No.: 73001626
- Added to NRHP: June 18, 1973

The Crozer Theological Seminary was a Baptist seminary located in Upland, Pennsylvania, and founded in 1868. It was named after the wealthy industrialist, John Price Crozer.

Martin Luther King Jr. was a student at Crozer Theological Seminary from 1948 to 1951, being elected student body president and graduating with a Bachelor of Divinity degree.

In 1970, the seminary merged with the Rochester Theological Seminary, forming the Colgate Rochester Crozer Divinity School in Rochester, New York and the seminary's Old Main building was subsequently used as office space by Crozer Hospital (now part of the Crozer-Chester Medical Center.) The Old Main building is a three-story, F-shaped, stucco-coated stone building with three pavilions connected by a corridor with flanking rooms. Each of the pavilions is topped by a gable roof and cupola, the largest cupola being on the central pavilion. The seminary's grounds are now the Crozer Arboretum.

The Old Main building in Upland was listed on the National Register of Historic Places in 1973.

== History ==
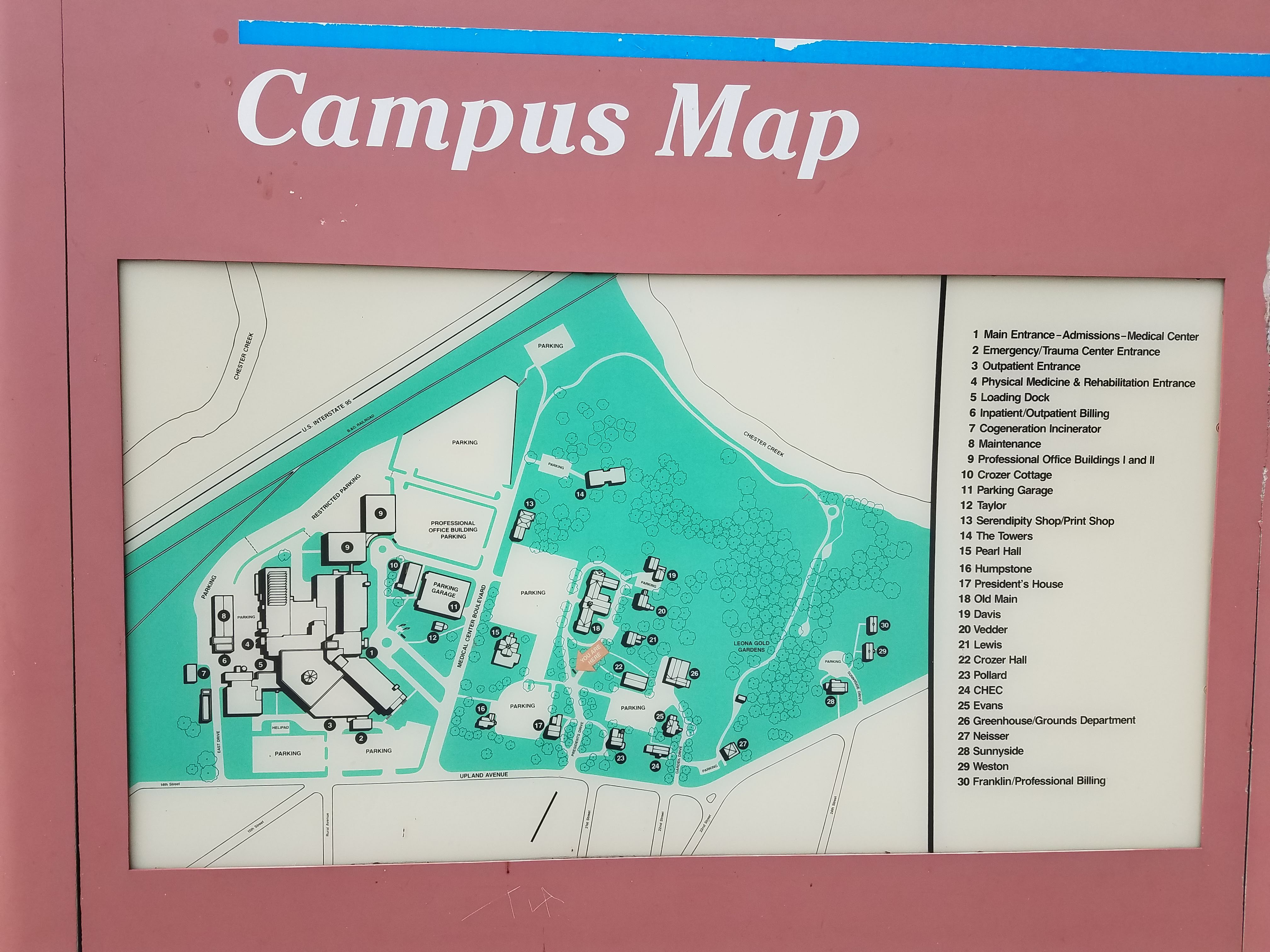
Crozer Chester Medical Center Campus Map

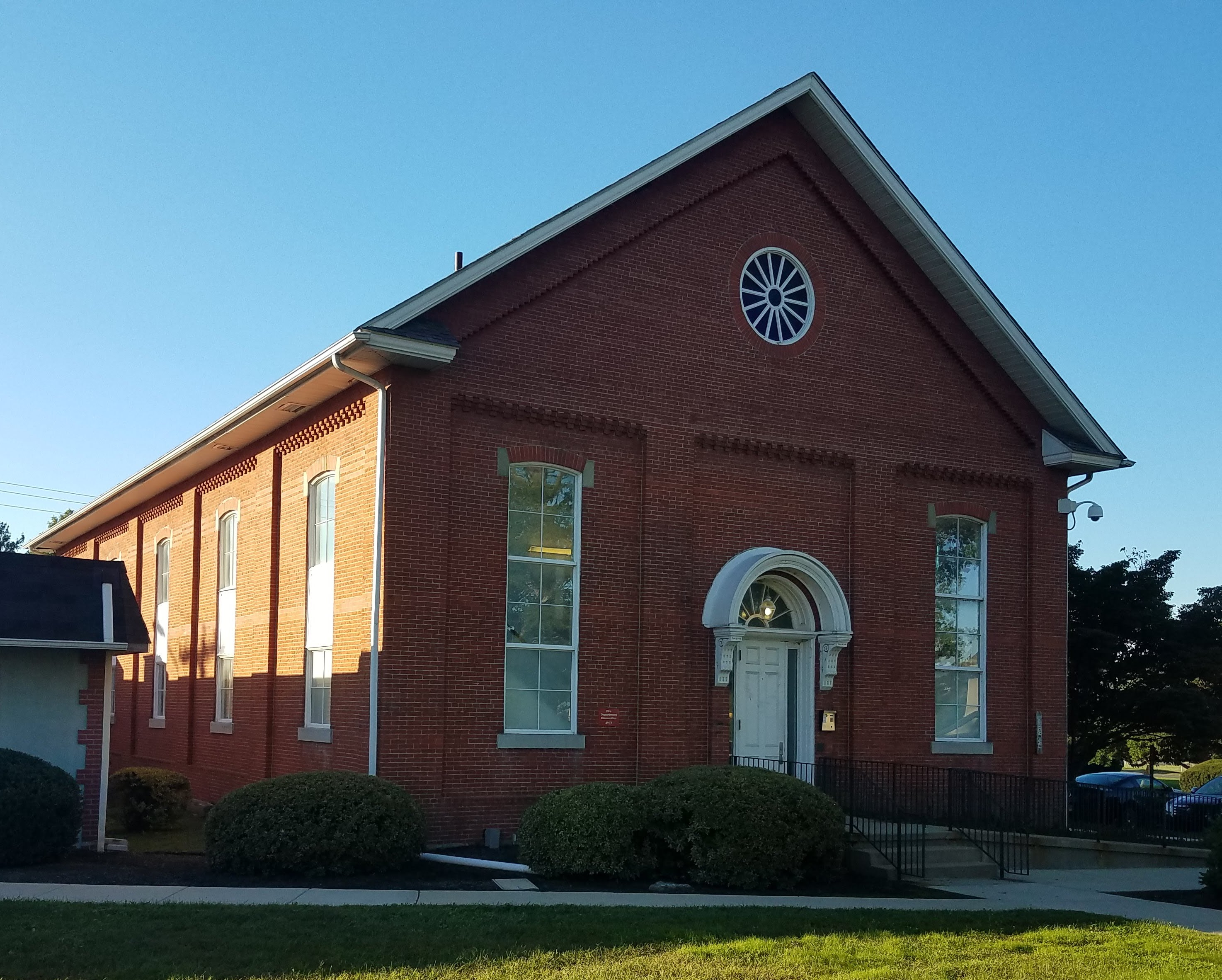
Crozer Hall

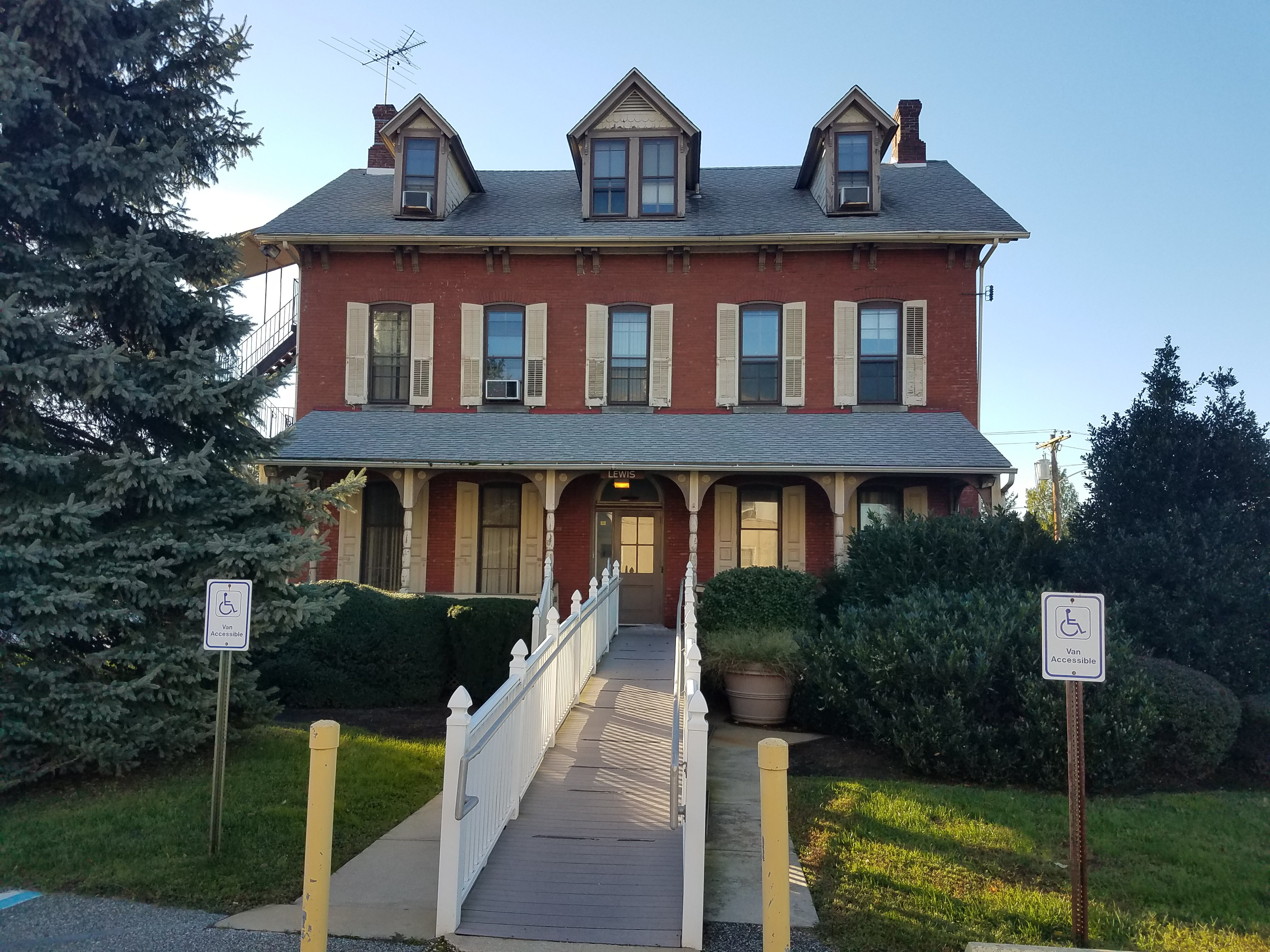
Lewis House

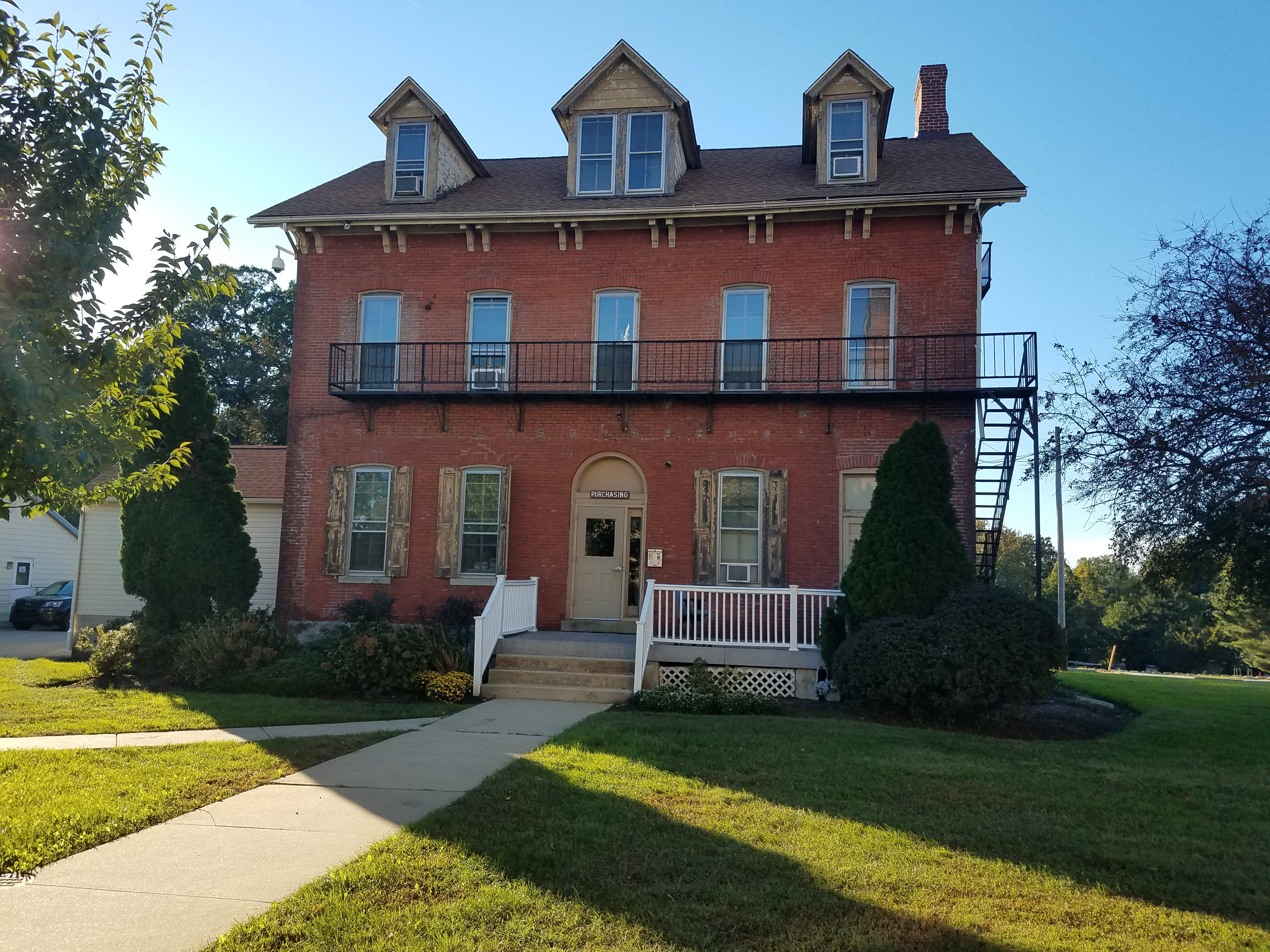
Vedder House

The Seminary began as the Normal School of Upland, established and built by the president of the board of directors of the American Baptist Publication Society, John Price Crozer. After the outbreak of the American Civil War, the school was closed.

Crozer allowed the Union army to use the building as a hospital during the Civil War. The hospital contained a thousand beds and accommodated 300 nurses, attendants and guards. The patients were almost exclusively Union soldiers except for after the battle of Gettysburg, in July 1863, when the number of wounded and sick Confederate army soldiers left on the battlefield required their acceptance at the hospital. During the war, more than 6,000 patients were treated. Many of the dead from the hospital were some of the first burials at nearby Chester Rural Cemetery.

After the war, the building was repossessed by Crozer and subsequently sold to Colonel Theodore Hyatt for use as the Pennsylvania Military Academy until 1868.

Crozer died in 1866. When Old Main was vacated by the Pennsylvania Military Academy his family converted the school to the Crozer Theological Seminary in his honor. His son recruited faculty for the new mission, It served as an American Baptist Church school, training seminarians for entry into the Baptist ministry from 1868 to 1970. Henry G. Watson was named its first President in 1869.

In 1970 the school moved to Rochester, New York, in a merger that formed the Colgate Rochester Crozer Divinity School. The old seminary building was used as the former Crozer Hospital (now the Crozer-Chester Medical Center). The building is currently used as administrative offices for the Crozer-Chester Medical Center.

Presidents
Name	Tenure
Henry G. Weston	1869–1909
Milton G. Evans	1909–1934
James H. Franklin	1934–1944
Edwin E. Aubrey	1944–1949
Sankey Lee Blanton	1950–1962
Ronald V. Wells	1962–1970

== Campus ==
The multi-acre campus contains the Crozer Arboretum and the following buildings:

- Humpstone
- President's House
- Pollard House
- CHEC
- Evans House
- Crozer Hall
- Neisser House
- Lewis House
- Vedder House
- Davis House
- Sunnyside House
- Westin House
- Franklin House

=== Pearl Hall ===
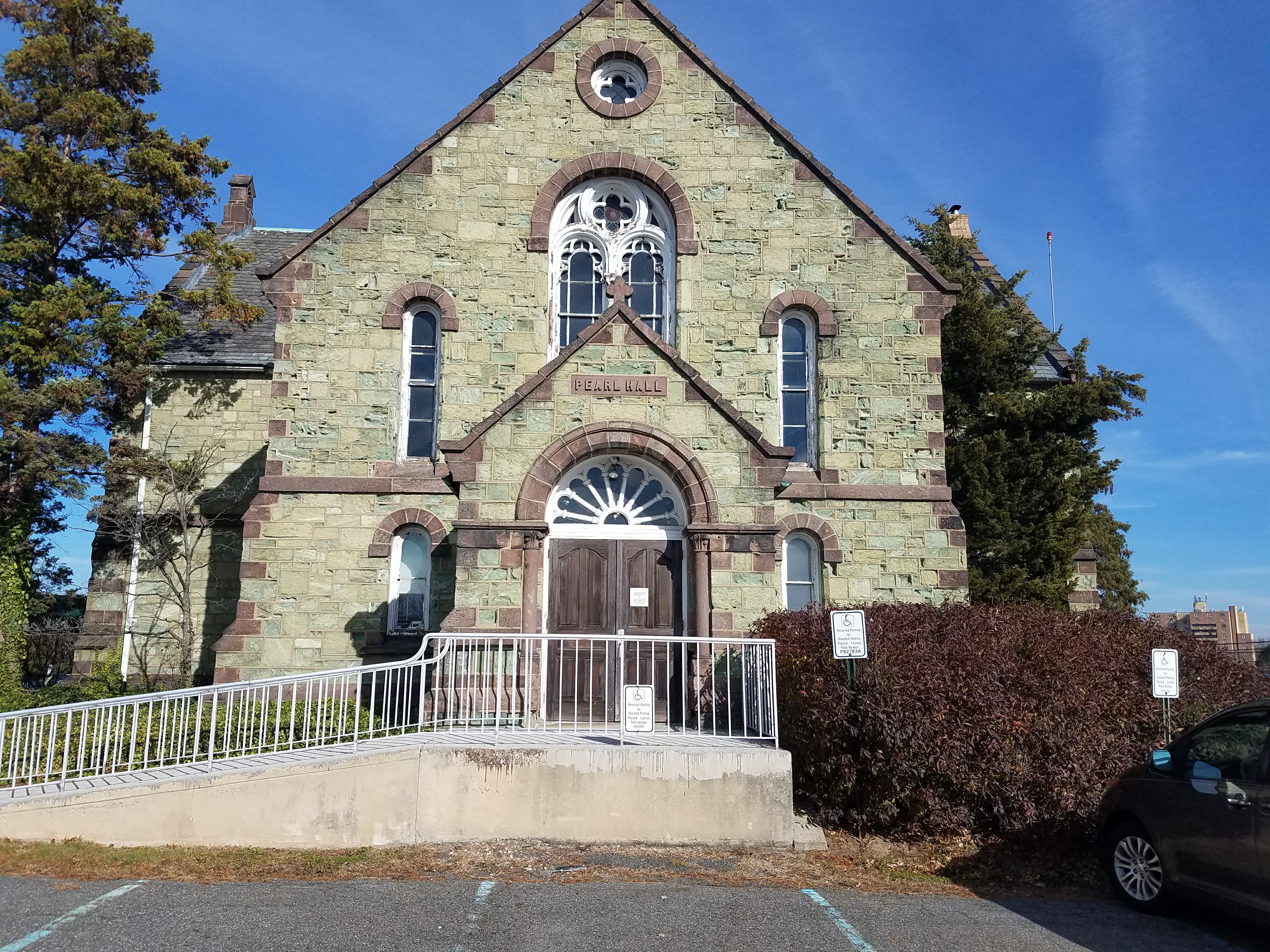
Pearl Hall Library

Pearl Hall is a serpentine stone library on the campus which opened on June 4, 1871. The building was sponsored by William Bucknell, the benefactor of Bucknell University, in memory of his late wife Margaret Crozer, the daughter of John Price Crozer. In addition to the $30,000 cost of the building, Bucknell also gave $25,000 for the cost of books and $10,000 for an endowment fund.

== Notable alumni ==
- George Barbier, actor
- J. Pius Barbour, pastor of Calvary Baptist Church in Chester, Pennsylvania, executive director of the National Baptist Association, editor of the National Baptist Voice, mentor to Martin Luther King Jr.
- Amos Brown, pastor and civil-rights activist
- John Warren Davis, New Jersey politician and federal judge, taught Greek and Hebrew at Crozer Theological Seminary for three years
- Elmer P. Gibson, high-ranking army chaplain who served in World War II and the Korean War, first African-American graduate of Crozer Theological Seminary (1930)
- William Augustus Jones Jr., minister and civil rights leader
- Martin Luther King Jr., Baptist minister and civil rights leader
- Samuel D. Proctor, minister, educator and humanitarian

== Notable faculty ==
- John Warren Davis, taught Hebrew and Greek for three years
- Lemuel Moss, professor of New Testament
- James B. Pritchard, taught in the chair of Old Testament History and Exegesis
- Henry Clay Vedder, professor of Church history
