= John Price Crozer =

American textile manufacturer and philanthropist

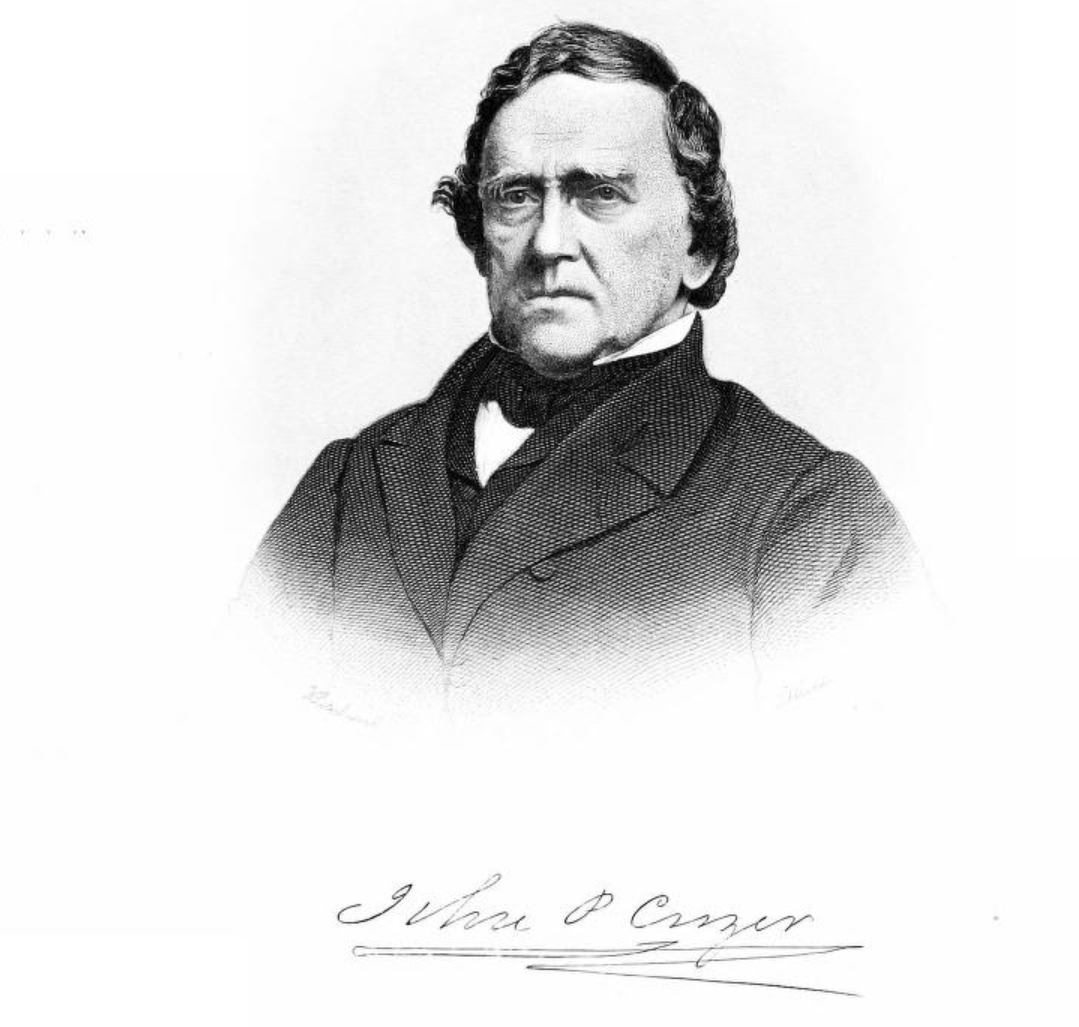
- Born: January 13, 1793; Delaware County, Pennsylvania, U.S.
- Died: March 11, 1866 (aged 73)
- Resting place: Upland Baptist Church, Upland, Pennsylvania, U.S.
- Occupation(s): textile manufacturer and banker

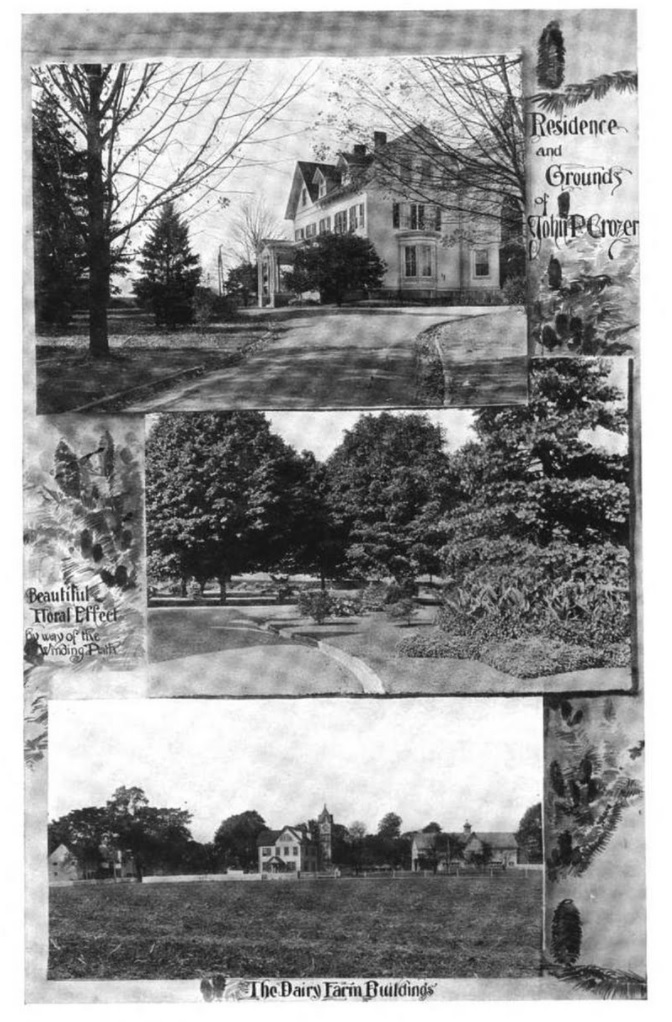
Residence and Grounds of John P. Crozer

John Price Crozer (January 13, 1793 – March 11, 1866) was an American textile manufacturer, banker, president of the board of directors of the American Baptist Publication Society, and philanthropist from Pennsylvania. His mills produced clothing for the US Army and other customers.

== Early life ==
Crozer was born January 13, 1793, to John and Sarah Crozer. Crozer grew up on a farm in Delaware County that is now the location of Swarthmore College. He eventually took over management of the family farm, sold it and used the profit to start his business ventures.

== Career ==
In 1821, Crozer rented a mill near Crum Creek in Ridley, Pennsylvania. In 1825, Crozer purchased the Mattson mill on the west branch of Chester Creek in Chester, Pennsylvania, and altered it by removing the cotton machinery. In 1845, Crozer purchased the Chester Mills from John W. Ashmead and converted it to a cotton mill. In 1846, Crozer built the mill known as No. 1, a five-story stone structure with 6,000 spindles and 150 looms and a number of stone houses for the workers. In 1852, Crozer built No. 2, a four-story mill with 7,000 spindles and 150 looms. In 1863, Crozer built mill No. 3, a four story mill with 7,140 throstle-spindles, 2,112 spinning mules and 256 looms. The three mills together consumed ninety bales of cotton and produced eighty-two cases of goods weekly.

Crozer was a director at the Delaware County National Bank from 1825 to 1862.

After his death, the mills were divided amongst his sons. Samuel A. Crozer inherited the No. 2 mill and Nos. 1 and 3 were operated by J. Lewis, George K. and Robert H. Crozer under the name J.P. Crozer & Sons.

=== Philanthropy ===
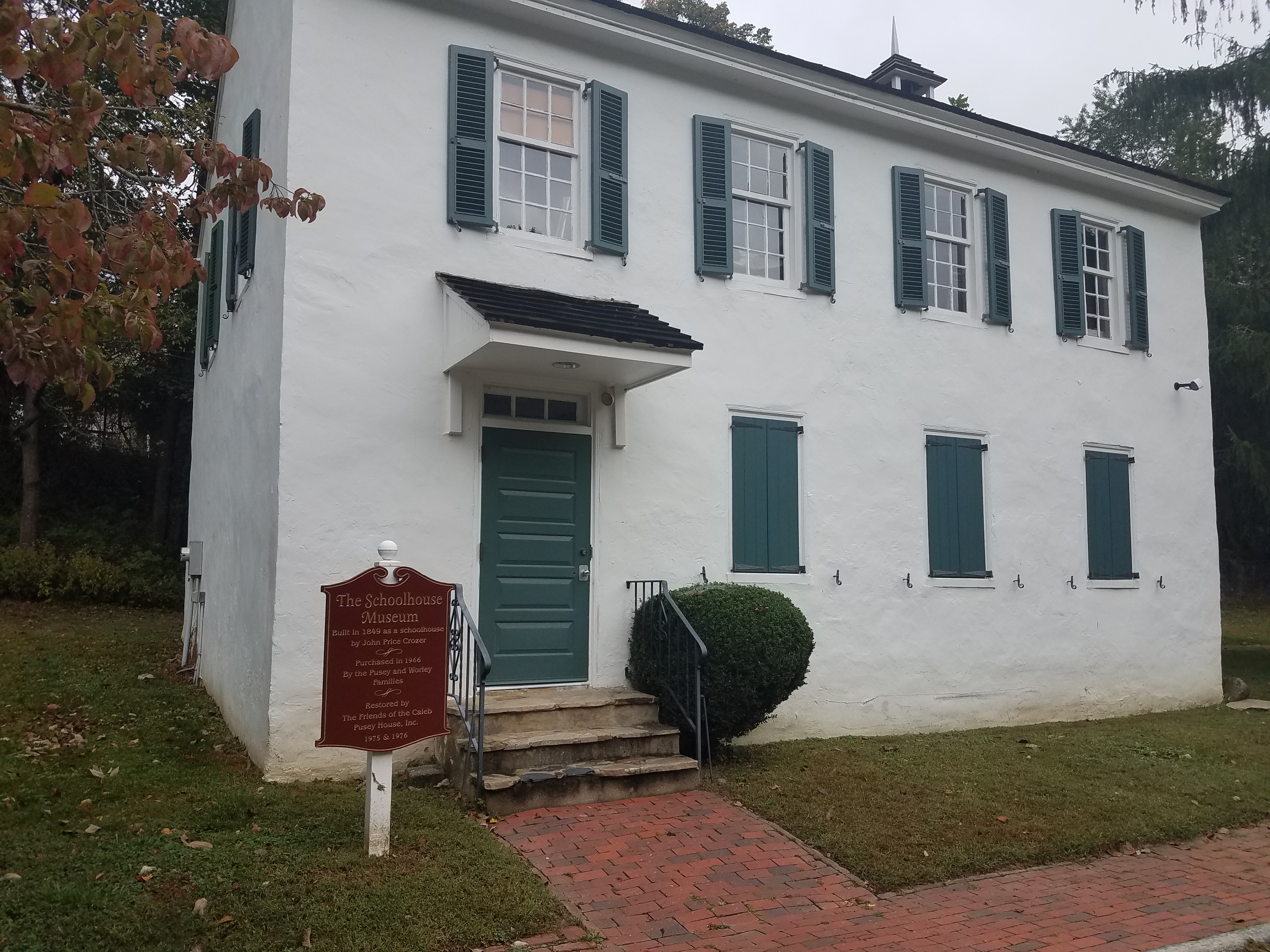
This schoolhouse in Upland, Pennsylvania, was built with funds donated by Crozer; it is currently used as a museum.

Crozer donated liberally to charitable, educational and religious organizations. At his own cost, he built the Upland Baptist Church. He donated the land on which the First Baptist Church of Chester was built and contributed largely to the construction of the church. He endowed a theological studies professorship at university now known as Bucknell University and built the Normal Institute for Boys in Upland (see Old Main Building below).

In 1849, Crozer convinced the school district of Chester to establish a school in Upland. He erected a building to be used exclusively as a school at his own expense. The building is currently used as The Schoolhouse Museum.

He was president of the Pennsylvania Colonization Society; president of the board of directors of the American Baptist Publication Society; president of the Pennsylvania Training-School for Feeble-Minded Children; president of the Home for Friendless Children; president of the Woman's Hospital of Philadelphia and president of the Pennsylvania Baptist Education Society. He was one of the founders of the Christian Commission.

Crozer and his brother Samuel were also benefactors of the American Colonization Society, and the namesake of Crozerville, a town in Montserrado County, Liberia. The town reportedly was home to numerous skilled mechanics and farmers, and was the birthplace of Albert Porte, a Barbadian political critic working for the Crozerville Observer.

=== Old Main Building ===
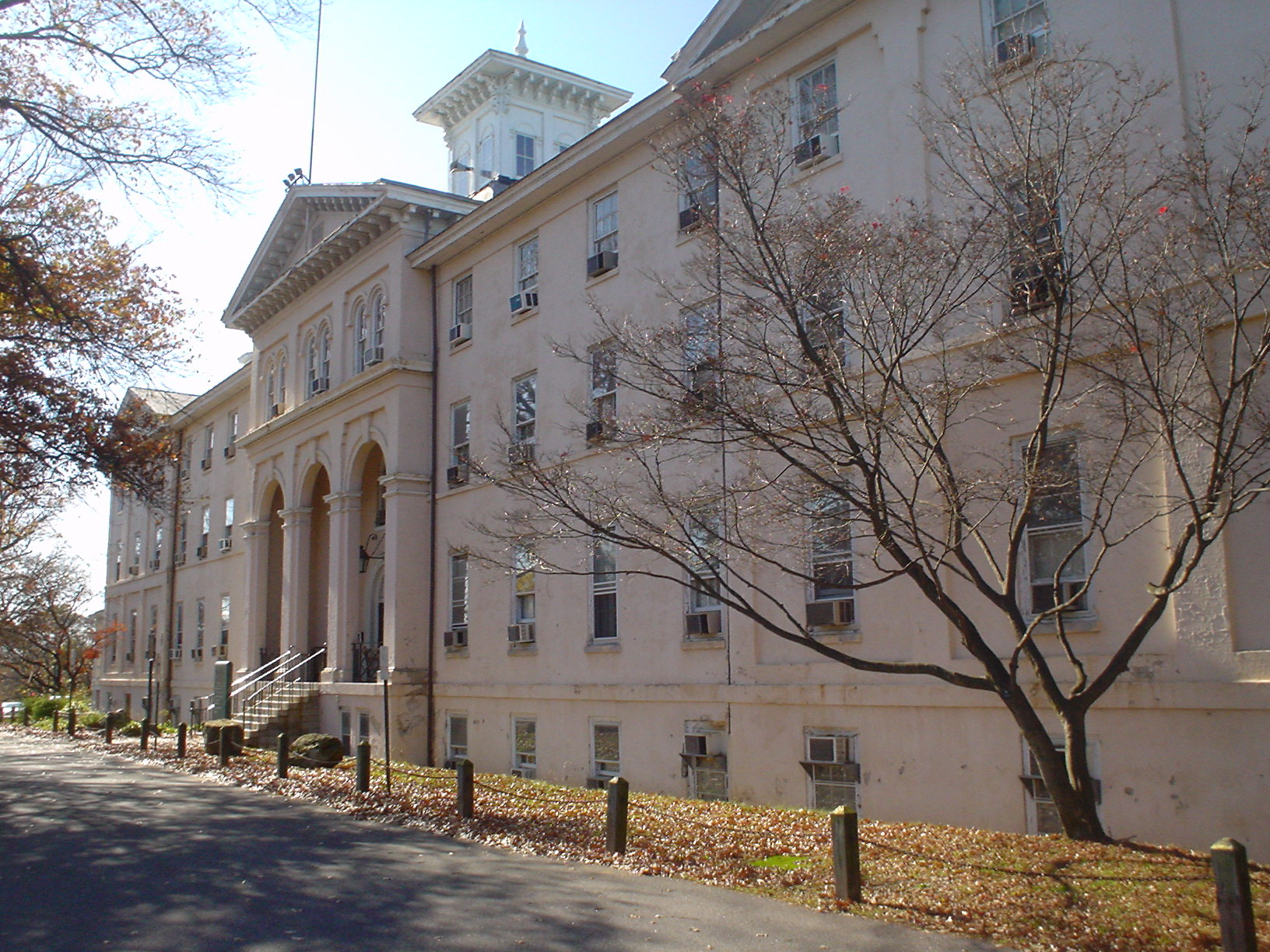
Old Main Building of the Crozer Theological Seminary

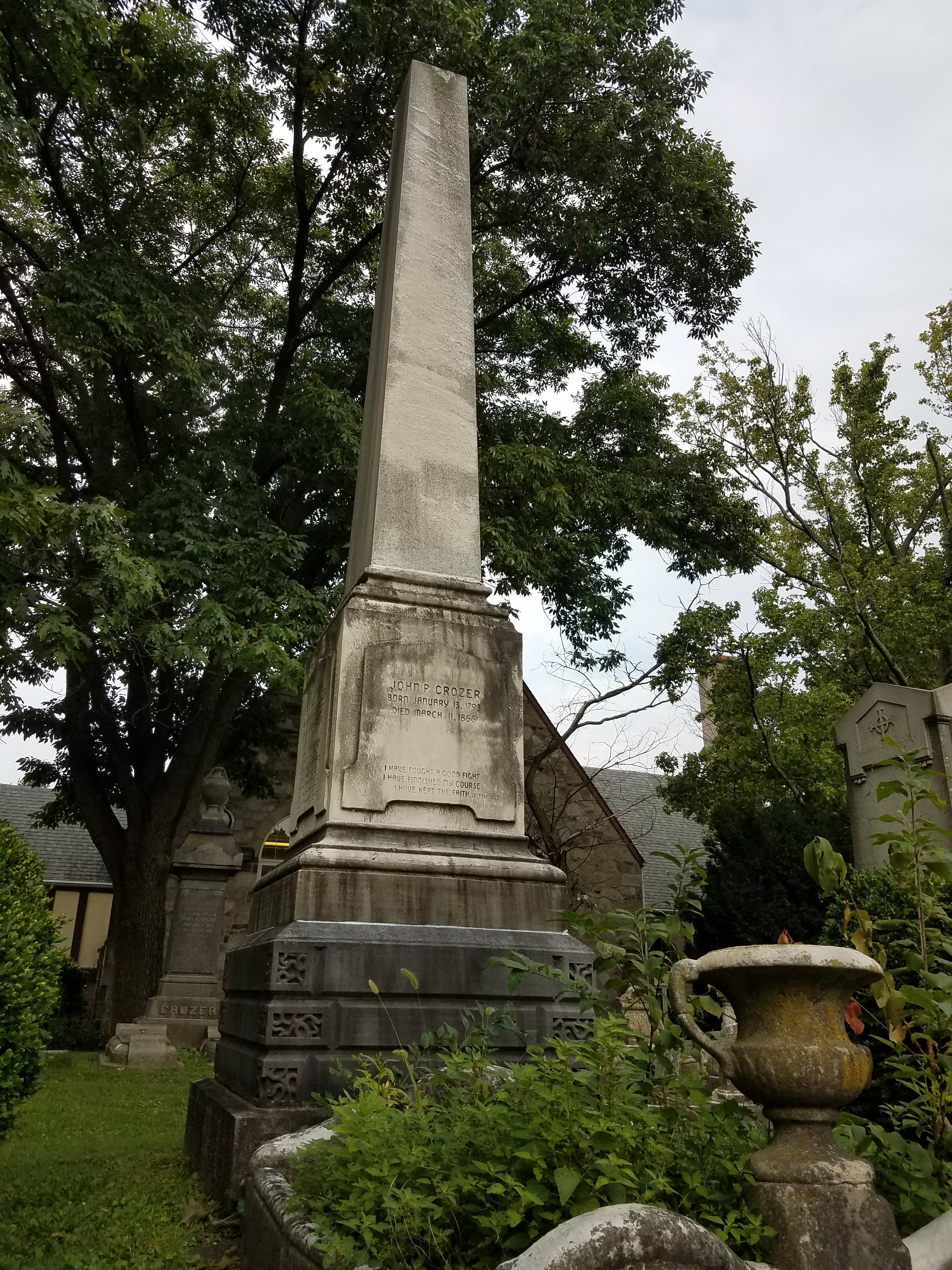
John Price Crozer's grave at Upland Baptist Church

Crozer provided the land and funds for the construction of Old Main in 1857 to house the Normal Institute for Boys. In June 1862, Crozer offered the building, without charge, to the United States Government for usage as a hospital. During the Civil War, the hospital treated wounded soldiers from both the Union and Confederate armies. The property was returned to Crozer and subsequently leased to Colonel Theodore Hyatt for use as the Pennsylvania Military Academy.

After Crozer's death in 1866, his children established the Crozer Theological Seminary in the Old Main building as a tribute to their father. The most famous student of the seminary was Martin Luther King Jr. He enrolled on September 14, 1948, and graduated on May 8, 1951, with a Bachelor of Divinity degree.

In 1970, the school moved to Rochester, New York in a merger that formed the Colgate Rochester Crozer Divinity School. After the relocation of the school, the Old Main building was purchased by Crozer Hospital (now part of Crozer-Chester Medical Center) for use as medical offices.

The Old Main building was added to the National Register of Historic Places in 1973.

== Personal life ==
Crozer married Sallie Lewis Knowles on March 12, 1825. They had nine children, - Samuel Aldrich, Margaret Knowles, Elizabeth Lewis Bowman, John Lewis, Sallie Knowles, James Gray, George Knowles, Robert Hall, and Emma.

His eldest daughter Margaret K. Crozer married William Bucknell, businessman and benefactor to Bucknell University. He is also the granduncle of still-life artist, Anna Lownes, and American lawyer and professor, Herbert W. Briggs.

Crozer is interred at the Upland Baptist Church cemetery in Upland, Pennsylvania.
