= Crozer Health =

Four-hospital health system based in Delaware County, Pennsylvania

Coordinates: 39.85595°N 75.36818°W

- Logo used since 2020
- Industry: Health care
- Founded: Delaware County, Pennsylvania, U.S.
- Headquarters: Springfield Township, Pennsylvania, U.S.
- Area served: Delaware County, Pennsylvania, northern Delaware, western New Jersey
- Key people: Peter Adamo, Chief Executive Officer
- Parent: Prospect Medical Holdings, Inc.
- Website: www.crozerhealth.org

Crozer Health was a four-hospital health system based in Delaware County, Pennsylvania, and serving Delaware County, northern Delaware, and parts of western New Jersey.

== History ==
=== Formation 1893-1990 ===
In 1893, the 48-bed Chester Hospital opened to serve the growing population of Chester, Pennsylvania. Ten years later, the J. Lewis Crozer Homeopathic Hospital opened nearby in Upland, Pennsylvania. In 1958, the J. Lewis Crozer Homeopathic Hospital was renamed Crozer Hospital and in 1963 merged with Chester Hospital to officially become the Crozer-Chester Medical Center.

Plans for a new hospital in Upper Darby Township, Pennsylvania, were drawn in 1925 and the Delaware County Hospital was chartered. It opened to the public on July 1, 1927, with 56 beds and 11 bassinets. The hospital was renamed Delaware County Memorial Hospital in 1959.

In 1970, the Crozer-Chester Medical Center expanded its campus by taking over the grounds of the Crozer Theological Seminary. This school originated as a normal school, built by the textile manufacturer John Price Crozer and was used as an Army hospital during the American Civil War and as part of the Pennsylvania Military Academy.

The Crozer Theological Seminary served as an American Baptist Church school and trained seminarians for entry into the Baptist ministry from 1869 to 1970. Martin Luther King Jr. was a student at the school from 1948 to 1951 and graduated with a Bachelor of Divinity degree. In 1970 the school moved to Rochester, New York, in a merger that formed the Colgate Rochester Crozer Divinity School.

=== Crozer-Keystone 1990-2016 ===
Crozer-Chester Medical Center and Delaware County Memorial Hospital formally merged in 1990 to create Crozer-Keystone Health System, making it the largest provider of healthcare services in Delaware County, Pennsylvania. Springfield Hospital (est. 1960) joined the system later that year.

In 1992, the health system acquired Sacred Heart Medical Center (est. 1983) in Chester, Pennsylvania and renamed it Community Hospital. Finally, Taylor Hospital (est. 1910) joined Crozer-Keystone Health System in 1997 as its newest member.

In November 2013, Crozer-Keystone Health System joined Noble Health Alliance. Abington Memorial Hospital, Aria Health, and Einstein Healthcare Network formed the alliance in July 2013. The initiative was intended to encourage collaboration between the four health systems in order to provide Philadelphia and its suburbs with more comprehensive care. In April 2016, the board of managers of Noble Health Alliance announced its decision to dissolve the organization.

=== Prospect Medical Holdings and closure 2016-2025 ===
In January 2016, Crozer-Keystone entered into a definitive agreement for the health system to be acquired by Prospect Medical Holdings, Inc. On July 1, 2016, Prospect Medical Holdings, Inc. completed its acquisition of Crozer-Keystone Health System after receiving all necessary regulatory approval.

In September 2020, the system's name was changed from Crozer-Keystone Health System to Crozer Health.

The health system was placed under financial stress during the COVID-19 pandemic due to supply chain issues and rising costs, causing government spenders to account for 60% of the hospital's income. On February 11, 2022, Christiana Care Health System announced the intent to acquire Crozer Health from Prospect Medical Holdings; however, this was later revoked.

Prospect Medical was sued by Pennsylvania Attorney General Michelle Henry in October 2024 over mismanagement and neglect of the Crozer Health System, citing "distribution of at least $457 million in dividends to its investors [funded] through a $1.12 billion dollar loan" while cuts were made to the service. On January 12, 2025, Prospect Medical filed for Chapter 11 bankruptcy protection, listing assets and liabilities between $1 billion and $10 billion. The company cited struggles with rising interest costs and high debt. Crozer Health System was placed into receivership in February 2025; FTI Consulting was chosen as the receiver by the courts and took over management of the system temporarily. The health system was finally closed in late April and early May 2025.

== Hospitals and facilities ==
Crozer Health comprised four hospitals and a network of outpatient centers. These facilities housed a Level 2 trauma center, a regional burn center, and three regional cancer centers.

=== Crozer-Chester Medical Center ===
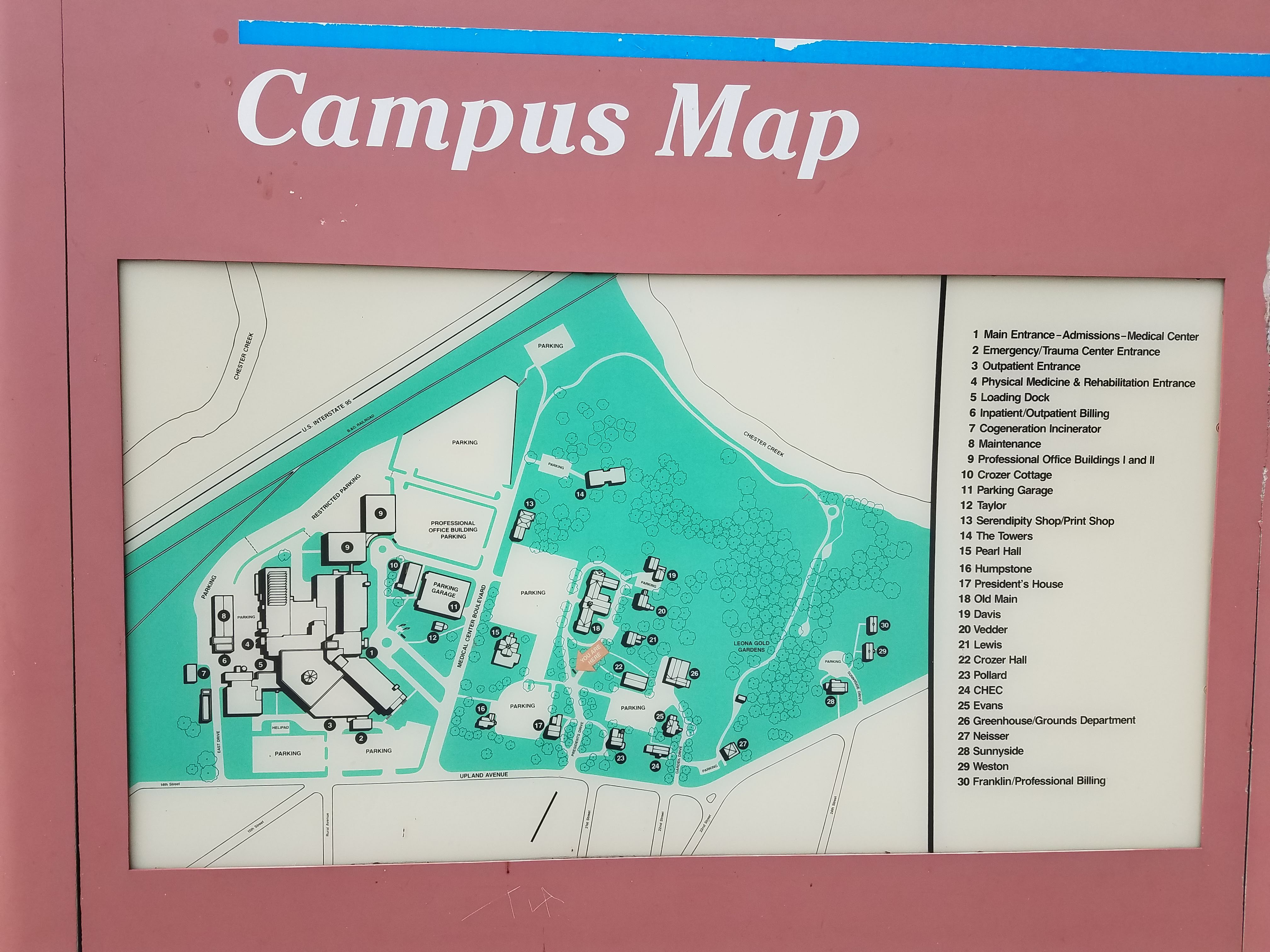
Crozer Chester Medical Center Campus Map

Crozer-Chester Medical Center (Crozer) was a 424-bed tertiary-care teaching hospital located on a 68-acre campus in Upland, Pennsylvania. A Level II trauma center, admitted more than 19,000 patients, treated approximately 53,000 Emergency Department patients and delivered approximately 1,700 babies annually. CCMC featured the world-class Nathan Speare Regional Burn Treatment Center.

=== Delaware County Memorial Hospital ===
Delaware County Memorial Hospital was a 225-bed facility in Drexel Hill, Pennsylvania, that offered a broad range of acute and specialized services. The hospital admitted over 10,000 patients, treated nearly 40,000 Emergency Department patients, completed more than 5,800 surgeries, and delivered more than 1,800 babies annually. DCMH has since closed its doors.

It has since closed down.

=== Taylor Hospital ===
Taylor Hospital was a 156-bed hospital in Ridley Park, Pennsylvania, that admitted more than 7,000 patients and received more than 28,000 Emergency Department visits.

=== Outpatient Centers ===
- Crozer Brinton Lake
- Media Medical Plaza
- Crozer-Keystone at Broomall
- Crozer-Keystone Surgery Center at Brinton Lake
- Crozer-Keystone Surgery Center at Haverford
- Philadelphia CyberKnife

==== Springfield Hospital ====
Springfield Hospital, in Springfield, Pennsylvania, originally served as an acute-care hospital. Crozer Health suspended all hospital-based services at the complex on January 14, 2022, including the emergency room and inpatient care. It remained open for outpatient services.
