= Alauddin =

Alauddin (Arabic: علاء الدين) is a Muslim male given name and, in modern usage, also a surname. This name derives from the Arabic “ʻAlāʼ ad-Dīn”, meaning “servant of Allah, nobility of faith, nobility of religion, nobility of the faith”. It is one of a large class of names ending with ad-Din.

== Given name ==
- Alauddin Ali Ahmad Sabir Kaliyari (b. 1196 AD), South Asian Sufi saint in the 13th century
- Alauddin Kayqubad I (r. 1220–1237), Seljuq Sultan of Rûm, he is also known as Kayqubad the Great
- Alauddin Khalji (r. 1296–1316), Afghan emperor of the Delhi Sultanate, He is also referred as the Defender of Hindustan (As he protected India from Mongols)
- Alaeddin Ali Pasha (b. 1280), First Grand Vizier (1320–1332) of Ottoman Empire and son of Osman I
- Alaeddin Ali Bey, son-in-law of Murad I and Karamanid Ruler (r. 1361–1397)
- Alauddin Ali Mubarak Shah, independent Sultan of Lakhnauti in Bengal (r. 1338–1342)
- Alauddin Hasan Bahman Shah, Founder of the Bahmani Sultanate (r. 1347–1358)
- Alauddin Ahmad Shah, tenth Sultan of Bahmani Sultanate (r. 1436–1458)
- Alauddin Alam Shah, the 4th ruler of Sayyid Dynasty of Delhi Sultanate (r. 1445–1451)
- Alauddin Husayn Shah, Sultan of Bengal founder of Husayn Shahi Dynasty (r. 1494–1520)
- Syed Alauddin Atar (1339–1402), was a Sufi Saint from Bukhara and Qutb of the Naqshbandi Sufi order. He was son-in-law of Bahauddin Naqshband
- Syed Alauddin Haydar (1824–1889), Preacher and Imam of Makkah Masjid & Freedom Fighter of India
- Alauddin Ahammad, Bangladeshi politician and academic
- Alauddin Al-Azad (1932–2009), Bangladeshi author, novelist, and poet.
- Alauddin Ali, Bangladeshi music composer
- Alauddin Marri (b. 1979), Pakistani businessman and social worker.
- Alauddin Siddiqui (1938–2017) Islamic Sufi Scholar from Azad Kashmir, Pakistan.
- Alauddin (cricketer) (b: 1976), Pakistani former cricketer.
- Alauddin Jani, governor of Bengal at 12th century of Mamluk dynasty
- Alauddin Ali Shah, independent ruler of Lakhnauti, the old capital of Bengal
- Alauddin al-Qahhar Shah, the 3rd Ruler of Aceh Sultanate (r. 1538–1571)
- Alauddin Mansur Syah (died 1585), 8th Sultan of Aceh in northern Sumatra
- Alauddin Mahmud Syah I (died 1781), 25th sultan of Aceh in northern Sumatra.
- Alauddin Muhammad Syah (b. 1760), 28th sultan of Aceh in northern Sumatra.
- Alauddin Muhammad Da'ud Syah I (b: 1802), 31st sultan of Aceh in northern Sumatra.
- Alauddin Ibrahim Mansur Syah (died 1870) was the 33rd sultan of Aceh in northern Sumatra.
- Alauddin Mahmud Syah II (died 1874), 34th sultan of Aceh in northern Sumatra.
- Alauddin Muhammad Da'ud Syah II (b: 1864), 35th and last sultan of Aceh in northern Sumatra.
- Alauddin Masud, 7th sultan of the Mamluk dynasty in the 12th century. (Slave dynasty)

== Surname ==
- Md. Alauddin (1925–2000), a Bangladeshi politician
- Kazi Alauddin, a Bangladesh Jatiya Party politician.
- Gogi Alauddin (b: 1950), a former squash player from Pakistan.
- M. Alauddin, a Bangladeshi Academic & researcher, 10th VC of Islamic University, Bangladesh.

== Disambiguation ==
- Alauddin Firuz Shah (disambiguation)
