= Syarif Saiful Alam Syah =

Syarif Saif Alam Syah

Sultan of Aceh Sultanate
- Reign: 1815–1819
- Predecessor: Alauddin Jauhar ul-Alam Syah
- Successor: Alauddin Muhammad Da'ud Syah I
- Born: Sayyid Abdullah
- Died: 1828
Names
- Sultan Syarif Saif Alam Syah
- Dynasty: Jamalullail
- Father: Tuanku Sayyid Husain Aidid
- Religion: Sunni Islam

Sultan Syarif Saif Alam Syah (died 1828) was the thirtieth sultan of Aceh in northern Sumatra. He ruled from 1815–1819 in opposition to the former sultan Alauddin Jauhar ul-Alam Syah.

== Background ==
His original name was Sayyid Abdullah. He was the son of Tuanku Sayyid Husain Aidid (usually known as Sayyid Husain), a wealthy merchant in Penang off the west coast of the Malay Peninsula, which had been a British colony since 1786. The family claimed descent from the Acehnese sultan Jamal ul-Alam Badr ul-Munir (1703–1726). A daughter of the sultan married a sayyid and supposedly gave birth to Sayyid Husain. However, the genealogy was later questioned since Sayyid Husain's mother would have been another person than the princess. The family left Aceh in the 1770s and settled first in the Riau Archipelago and later Kuala Selangor before moving to Penang. Sayyid Husain had extensive commercial interests in Aceh. He collected pepper from the west coast and betel from Pidië and brought in opium and textiles in exchange.

== Rebellion against Sultan Alauddin Jauhar ul-Alam Syah ==
Sayyid Husain had fallen out of favour with Sultan Jauhar ul-Alam Syah of Aceh over an issue. In the early nineteenth century, the sultan's attempts to control trade evoked the discontent of the Acehnese merchants, chiefs, and the British who wanted free access to the ports. Sayyid Husain became involved in a movement to depose Alauddin Jauhar ul-Alam Syah, formally because of his non-observance to Islamic norms. The rebellion broke out in October 1814, and in April 1815 Sayyid Husain was elected sultan of Aceh by the panglimas (headmen) of the three sagis or regions of which Aceh consisted. However, he was never formally enthroned and forwarded the dignity to his son Sayyid Abdullah in November of the same year. Abdullah took the throne name Sultan Syarif Saiful Alam Syah. It goes without saying that his father Sayyid Husain held most of the actual power.

== Civil war ==
However, Alauddin Jauhar ul-Alam Syah returned to Aceh in 1816 and began to rally forces against Syarif Saiful Alam Syah. No party was powerful enough to defeat the other. The Acehnese chiefs did not give enthusiastic support to Syarif Saiful Alam despite earlier promises. The sultan did not feel too secure in the palace in Kutaraja but moved his residence to a place at the coast, Telok Samoy. The sultan had to trust his father's financial resources. 200 armed men were recruited in Penang, but the British were not interested in direct interference. To make things worse, Sayyid Husain was arrested by the colonial authorities for piratical activities in 1816 due to attacks against ships trading in areas which supported Alauddin Jauhar ul-Alam Syah. He was soon released, however.

Meanwhile, the end of the Napoleonic Wars meant that the British became interested in finding a solution in Aceh that would favour the important pepper trade. A mission under John Coombs visited Aceh in 1818 and found Syarif Saiful Alam to be the rightful claimant. Coombs offered him a treaty with Great Britain which the sultan eagerly endorsed. A new mission was dispatched in the next year under Coombs and Thomas Stamford Raffles. On his way, Raffles founded the Singapore colony in February. Arriving in Aceh in March, he took another position than Coombs last year. The sultan's claim to the throne was deemed spurious and Alauddin Jauhar ul-Alam Syah was considered the best alternative. The British now made a treaty with him in April 1819. By this time Sayyid Husain had lost large sums on the adventure and his son saw no possibility to maintain his position without British support. The sultan left Aceh in early 1820 and sailed to Calcutta to plead his case. He found no support from the colonial authorities and returned to Penang in July 1820, leaving Aceh to its fate. However, his departure did not end the kingdom's unsettled conditions.

== After abdication ==
The ex-sultan resettled in Penang where he received a compensation of 6,000 dollars per year. His father Sayyid Husain had lost all interest for the Acehnese throne and resumed his trading activities; he died in 1826 and was buried at the side of a mosque in Penang. A brother of the ex-sultan, Sayyid Akil, tried to become sultan of Deli on Sumatra's east coast in 1826-27 but was unsuccessful. Syarif Saiful Alam himself died in 1828 while travelling to Mecca for the pilgrimage.

== Literature ==
- Djajadiningrat, Raden Hoesein (1911) 'Critische overzicht van de in Maleische werken vervatte gegevens over de geschiedenis van het soeltanaat van Atjeh', Bijdragen tot de Taal-, Land- en Volkenkunde 65, pp. 135-265.
- Lee Kam Hing (1995) The Sultanate of Aceh: Relations with the British, 1760–1824. Kuala Lumpur: Oxford University Press.
- Zainuddin, H.M. (1961) Tarich Atjeh dan Nusantara, Jilid I. Medan: Pustaka Iskandar Muda.

Preceded by Alauddin Jauhar ul-Alam Syah	Sultan of Aceh Sultanate; 1815–1819	Succeeded by Alauddin Jauhar ul-Alam Syah
