= Alauddin Jauhar ul-Alam Syah =

Alauddin Jauharul Alam Syah علاء الدين جوهر العلم شاه
- Sultan of Aceh
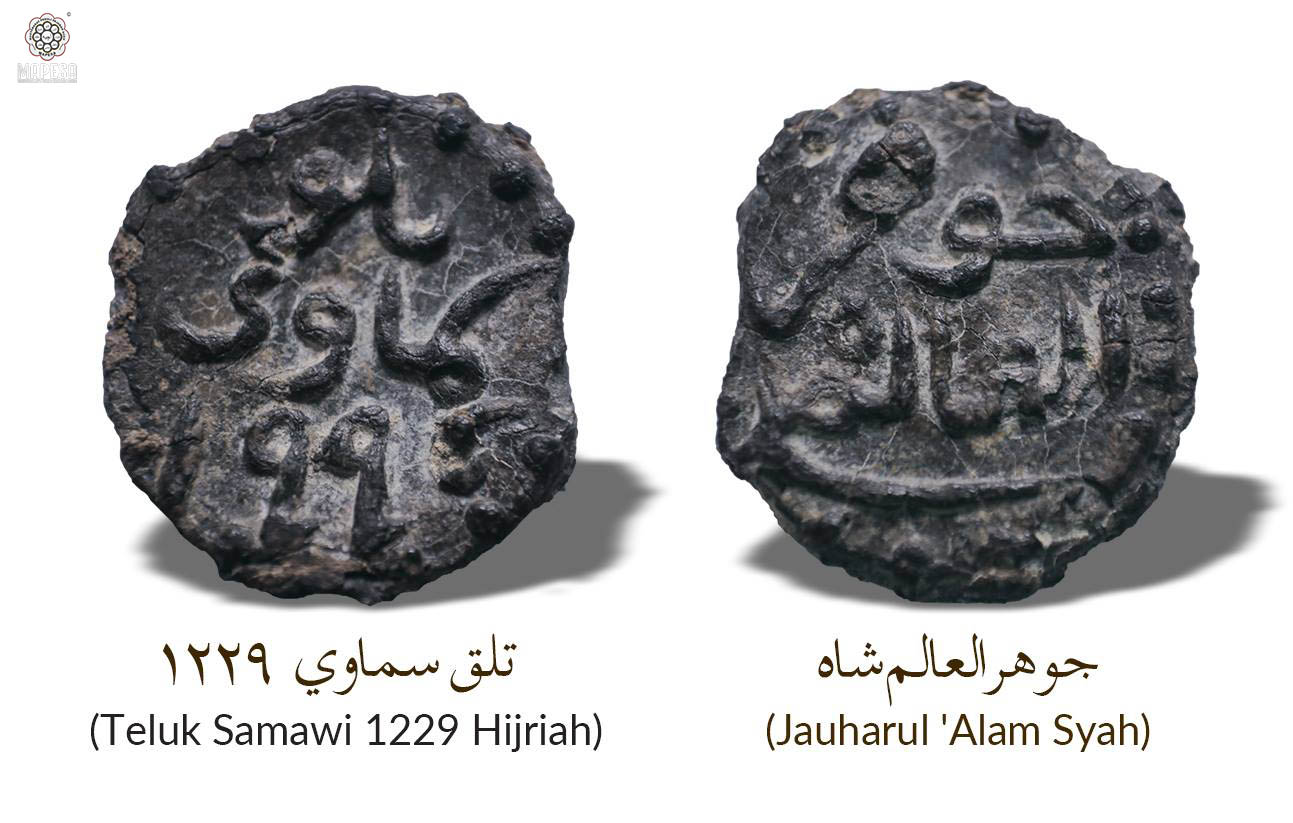
- Coin from the era of Sultan Alauddin Jauhar ul-Alam Shah

Sultan of Aceh First Period
- Reign: 1795 - 1815
- Predecessor: Alauddin Muhammad Syah
- Successor: Syarif Saiful Alam Syah

Second Period
- Reign: 1819 - 1823
- Predecessor: Syarif Saiful Alam Syah
- Successor: Alauddin Muhammad Daud Syah I
- Born: 1786; Bandar Aceh Darussalam, Aceh Sultanate
- Died: 1 December 1823 (aged 36–37); Bandar Aceh Darussalam, Aceh Sultanate
- Issue: Tuanku Ibrahim Mansur
- House: Aceh-Wajoq
- Father: Alauddin Muhammad Syah
- Mother: Putroe Bineue, also known as Pocut Meurah Awan
- Religion: Islam Sunni

Sultan Alauddin Jauhar ul-Alam Syah (c. 1786 – 1 December 1823) was the twenty-ninth sultan of Aceh in northern Sumatra. He ruled in 1795–1815 and again in 1819–1823, the intervening period being filled by the usurper Syarif Saiful Alam Syah.

== Enthronement and regency ==
When Sultan Alauddin Muhammad Syah died in February 1795 he left a 9-year-old son, Husain, who was born from his main wife Merah di Awan (daughter of a previous sultan, Badr ul-Alam Syah). After an interregnum of about one month, Husain was proclaimed under the name Sultan Alauddin Jauhar ul-Alam Syah. Merah di Awan made sure that her brother Raja Udahna Lela was appointed regent for the young sultan. The first years of the regency were relatively tranquil. The sultan, who had spent time on a British ship as a boy, spoke English and was well acquainted with European customs. He took up the habit of drinking alcohol, which did not endear him to the Muslim clergy. The British were in possession of Penang off the coast of the Malay Peninsula since 1786 and there was a steady trade with the Acehnese who produced pepper and other local produce. The pepper ports of the west coast of Aceh continued to develop, some being dominated by the enterprising Lebai Dappa, father-in-law of Raja Udahna Lela. A serious incident occurred in 1803 when the ship Crescent was plundered by the inhabitants of Muki (north of Singkil). A British punitive expedition departed from Bengkulu in 1804 and captured the fort in Muki.

== First civil war ==
Sultan Alauddin Jauhar ul-Alam Syah began to reign in the own name in 1802. However, his uncle Raja Udahna Lela was not willing to step down from his prerogatives as regent. He rebelled against the sultan, supported by the commercial strongman Lebai Dappah. At first Alauddin Jauhar ul-Alam Syah had to flee to Pidië. After some time, he returned to the estuary of the Aceh River and asked the British in Penang for help to defeat the rebellion. No European help came, but the sultan managed to defeat Raja Udahna Lela after his mother, sister of the regent, had shifted her support from her brother to her son. Raja Udahna Lela fled in turn in 1805 but was caught and killed at Nesuk. The authority of Alauddin Jauhar ul-Alam Syah nevertheless stood on a shaky ground, and he had problems harvesting the duties on the West Coast. In spite of the expanding pepper trade, the sultan benefited little since he did not have the bureaucratic apparatus to control economic flows. When he nevertheless tried, he inevitably created discontent among his subjects. A brief revolt that involved Lebai Dappah occurred in 1808 but was suppressed. It might partly have been caused by the sultan's use of British, French and Portuguese adventurers as trusted men.

== Second civil war ==
After the British seizure of Dutch Java in 1811, relations between Aceh and the British became increasingly strained. British officials and merchants on Sumatra and Penang wanted free access to Acehnese ports and were dissatisfied with the sultan's attempts to control trade. Penang merchants as well as Acehnese traders wished to get rid of Alauddin Jauhar ul-Alam Syah. Falling pepper prices in the wake of the Napoleonic Wars added to the discontent. A wealthy Penang merchant, Sayyid Husain, claimed descent from Sultan Jamal ul-Alam Badr ul-Munir (1703-1726) and gained a key role in the movement against the sultan. A revolt broke out in October 1814. The sultan was accused of un-Islamic behaviour and was declared deposed by the panglimas (leaders) of the three sagis (regions). Sayyid Husain was elected sultan in April 1815 but soon forwarded the dignity to his son Sayyid Abdullah who was enthroned in November under the name Syarif Saiful Alam Syah. Alauddin Jauhar ul-Alam fled to Penang and asked the British for assistance which was naturally not provided. However, the ex-sultan still had sympathies among some of the elite and was invited back by the lord of Pidië. In spite of two attempts by Sayyid Husain to have him murdered, he established a base in Pasai. An inconclusive war was fought against the two sayyids during the next few years. A British mission to Aceh in 1818 found Syarif Saiful Alam Syah to be the most promising of the rival candidates. However, a new mission under Thomas Stamford Raffles in 1819 saw things differently. The British were anxious to negotiate a treaty with Aceh which was the only part of Sumatra that had not turned Dutch after Britain handed back the Dutch East Indies in 1816. It was vital to end the civil war, and the best way according to Raffles was to remove Syarif Saiful Alam Syah whose claims to the throne were spurious. He signed a formal treaty with Alauddin Jauhar ul-Alam Syah on 22 April 1819. It stipulated the appointment of a British agent, exclusion of other nations, and active British support to secure the throne. With no prospects of British support Syarif Saiful Alam Syah could not maintain his position but left Aceh and subsequently lived in Penang where he enjoyed an allowance of 6,000 dollars per year.

== Last years ==
The 1819 treaty effectively became a dead letter. Moreover, the restored sultan had difficulties making his authority heard. Most of the political players in Aceh were still opposed to his governance. Only in 1820 did he manage to establish himself in the outskirts of the capital Kutaraja. He built a fortified stockade at the mouth of the Aceh River from which he carried on some trade and collected revenues. He asked the British for 500 sepoys and military supplies to use to fight the panglimas of the three sagis, but was disappointed. Eventually he died on 1 December 1823 without having managed to take full control of the capital. He left six children of which Alauddin Muhammad Da'ud Syah I succeeded him. The succession brought an end to the long period of civil strife in Aceh.

== Literature ==
- Djajadiningrat, Raden Hoesein (1911) 'Critische overzicht van de in Maleische werken vervatte gegevens over de geschiedenis van het soeltanaat van Atjeh', Bijdragen tot de Taal-, Land- en Volkenkunde 65, pp. 135–265.
- Encyclopaedie van Nederlandsch-Indië (1917), Vol. 1. 's Gravenhage & Leiden: M. Nijhoff & Brill.
- Lee Kam Hing (1995) The Sultanate of Aceh: Relations with the British, 1760–1824. Kuala Lumpur: Oxford University Press.

| Preceded by Alauddin Muhammad Syah | Sultan of Aceh; 1795–1815 | Succeeded by Syarif Saiful Alam Syah |
| Preceded by Syarif Saiful Alam Syah | Sultan of Aceh; 1819–1823 | Succeeded by Alauddin Muhammad Da'ud Syah I |
