= Alauddin Muhammad Syah =

Sultan of Aceh

Alauddin Muhammad Syah علاء الدين محمد شاه
- Sultan

Sultan of Aceh
- Reign: 1781-1795
- Predecessor: Alauddin Mahmud Syah I
- Successor: Alauddin Jauharul Alam Syah
- Born: 1760; Bandar Aceh Darussalam, Aceh Sultanate
- Died: 1795 (aged 34–35); Bandar Aceh Darussalam, Aceh Sultanate
- Spouse: Merah di Awan
- House: Aceh-Wajoq
- Father: Alauddin Mahmud Syah I
- Religion: Islam Sunni

Sultan Alauddin Muhammad Syah (c. 1760 – 1795) was the twenty-eighth sultan of Aceh in northern Sumatra. He reigned between 1781 and 1795.

== Youth and accession ==
Tuanku Muhammad, as he was called before his becoming sultan, was born in about 1760, being 22 Muslim years in 1781. While he was still a prince he performed the hajj to Mecca but was forced to spend time in the French colony Mauritius due to adverse winds. There he became fascinated in Western metallurgy and the production of artillery shells. During his travels he learnt an amount of French and Portuguese. When his father Sultan Alauddin Mahmud Syah I died in 1781 after a much-troubled reign, opinions were divided among the grandees whether Tuanku Muhammad or his younger brother Tuanku Cut should succeed to the dignity. The parties were on the verge to resort to violence when the teacher of Tuanku Muhammad appeared and besought them not spill any blood; rather, he would withdraw with his pupil and leave Tuanku Cut to take the throne. His speech made impression, and Tuanku Muhammad was after all enthroned under the name Sultan Alauddin Muhammad Syah.

As a person the new sultan was described as bookish and an introvert. He withdrew for long periods in order to meditate and took an interest in religious practices that would make him invulnerable to harm. Under these circumstances his principal queen Merah di Awan, a daughter of Sultan Badr ul-Alam Syah (d. 1765) gained a degree of influence in court affairs. In contrast with his father he acquired a degree of popularity among his subjects, although he did not quite trust them and preferred to keep a lifeguard of Indian sepoys. His powers were severely circumscribed by the influence of the uleëbalangs (chiefs) and orang kayas (grandees).

== Changing economic structures ==
His reign saw some economic changes of consequence in Aceh and especially its western coast. Conditions were favourable for pepper cultivation in the western coastal districts with their sloping plains and river valleys. New plants were brought over from the Malabar Coast and Acehnese from other parts of the kingdom immigrated to the west coast. Especially, two brothers called Lebai Kontee and Lebai Dappah established themselves in Singkil which was revitalized as a pepper-exporting port. Indian, American and European trading ships visited the pepper-rich regions. The British in Bengal were interested in acquiring a fortified post in Aceh and sent repeated envoys to the sultan. However, the colonial administrator Francis Light opined that a considerable force would be needed to keep a secure post there, and rather pointed at the possibilities with Penang off the coast of the Malay Peninsula. Penang was founded as a British colony in August 1786 and quickly attracted Acehnese traders who arrived with betel-nut, pepper, rice, cloth and so on. However, Acehnese-British relations were not always peaceful in this period. 200 Acehnese warriors unexpectedly raided British Tapanuli on the west coast in 1786, triggering a British punitive expedition. French ships visited Aceh with some frequency after 1793 which made the British highly anxious of an Acehnese-French alliance.

== Death ==
The reign of Sultan Alauddin Muhammad Syah was not without internal tension. In 1787 rebels operated on the betel-producing Pidië coast and supposedly received weapons from British merchants. In 1791 there were likewise disturbances. The sultan died still a young man in February 1795. There were rumours of poisoning (as there had been at the death of his father). The sultan was succeeded by his son Alauddin Jauhar ul-Alam Syah.

== Literature ==
- Djajadiningrat, Raden Hoesein (1911) 'Critische overzicht van de in Maleische werken vervatte gegevens over de geschiedenis van het soeltanaat van Atjeh', Bijdragen tot de Taal-, Land- en Volkenkunde 65, pp. 135–265.
- Encyclopaedie van Nederlandsch-Indië (1917), Vol. 1. 's Gravenhage & Leiden: M. Nijhoff & Brill.
- Lee Kam Hing (1995) The Sultanate of Aceh: Relations with the British, 1760–1824. Kuala Lumpur: Oxford University Press.

Preceded by Alauddin Mahmud Syah I	Sultan of Aceh; 1781–1795	Succeeded by Alauddin Jauhar ul-Alam Syah
