= Sulaiman Syah =

Sultan Sulaiman Syah (died after 1773) was the twenty-seventh sultan of Aceh in northern Sumatra. He usurped the throne from the reigning House of Royal Buginese Wajoq-Aceh and held power May–July 1773.

The previous sultan Alauddin Mahmud Syah I led a troubled reign and often encountered opposition from the chiefs of the kingdom. He was briefly deposed by an usurper, Badr ul-Alam Syah in 1764-1765. A new uprising was launched in April 1773 by people of the often-rebellious XXII Mukims, one of the three sagis (regions) of Aceh. Being joined by people from the XXV Mukims, the insurgents expelled Alauddin Mahmud Syah who fled to Mukim Peuët. At the end of May the victorious party appointed Raja Udahna Lela as sultan under the name Sulaiman Syah. Whether he was the same person as a Raja Udahna Lela who was the son of the previous usurper Badr ul-Alam Syah, is unsure. Alauddin Mahmud Syah was nevertheless able to gather supporters from the mukims (districts) Daroy Pang Uleë Susuh, Lam Ara and Jampel. Sulaiman Syah was attacked and expelled after only two months' reign, and Alauddin Mahmud Syah was restored. If Sulaiman Syah is the same person as Badr ul-Alam Syah's son Raja Udahna Lela, he later played an important rule in the history of the sultanate and died under dramatic circumstances in 1805.

== Literature ==
- Djajadiningrat, Raden Hoesein (1911) 'Critische overzicht van de in Maleische werken vervatte gegevens over de geschiedenis van het soeltanaat van Atjeh', Bijdragen tot de Taal-, Land- en Volkenkunde 65, pp. 135–265.
- Encyclopaedie van Nederlandsch-Indië (1917), Vol. 1. 's Gravenhage & Leiden: M. Nijhoff & Brill.
- Zainuddin, H.M. (1961) Tarich Atjeh dan Nusantara, Jilid I. Medan: Pustaka Iskandar Muda.

Preceded by Alauddin Mahmud Syah I	Sultan of Aceh; 1773	Succeeded by Alauddin Mahmud Syah I
