= Syamsul Alam =

Shams al-Alam Jamalullail شمس العالم جمال الليل
- Sultan

Sultan of Aceh Sultanate
- Reign: 1726 – 1727
- Predecessor: Jauhar ul-Alam
- Successor: Alauddin Ahmad Syah
- Born: Banda Aceh, Aceh Sultanate
- Died: after 1727; Banda Aceh, Aceh Sultanate
- Dynasty: Jamal ul-Lail
- Religion: Islam

Sultan Syamsul Alam (died after 1727) was the twenty-second Sulṭān of Acèh Darussalam in northern Sumatra. He ruled from 1726 to 1727 and was the fourth and last ruler of the Arabic Jamal ul-Lail Dynasty.

Originally called Wandi Tebing, he was the nephew of Sultan Jamal ul-Alam Badr ul-Munir. The three constituent regions (sagi) of Aceh rebelled against Jamal ul-Alam who was deposed in November 1726. One of his counselors, Jauhar ul-Alam took the throne but died after a very brief reign. Seven days later Wandi Tebing was placed on the throne under the name Sultan Syamsul Alam, being supported by the mukims (districts) Montassik, Lamcampuk, Hoho and Piëng. However, not all the chiefs approved of this. After 30 days the three sagis unanimously offered the throne to the Buginese commander of the fortress in the capital, Maharaja Lela. Maharaja Lela accepted the offer and Syamsul Alam was deposed in January 1727. His later life is not recorded in.

== Literature ==
- Djajadiningrat, Raden Hoesein (1911) 'Critische overzicht van de in Maleische werken vervatte gegevens over de geschiedenis van het soeltanaat van Atjeh', Bijdragen tot de Taal-, Land- en Volkenkunde 65, pp. 135-265.
- Taniputera, Ivan (2013) Kerajaan-kerajaan Nusantara pascakeruntuhan Majapahit. Jakarta: Gloria Group.
- Zainuddin, H.M. (1961) Tarich Atjeh dan Nusantara, Jilid I. Medan: Pustaka Iskandar Muda.

Preceded by Jauhar ul-Alam	Sultan of Aceh Sultanate; 1726–1727	Succeeded by Alauddin Ahmad Syah
