= Alauddin Muhammad Da'ud Syah I =

Sultan of Aceh (1802–1838)

Alauddin Muhammad Daud Syah I علاء الدين محمد داود شاه الأول
- Sultan

Sultan of Aceh
- Reign: 1823 - 1838
- Predecessor: Alauddin Jauharul Alam Syah
- Successor: Alauddin Sulaiman Ali Iskandar Syah
- Born: 1802; Bandar Aceh Darussalam, Sultanate of Aceh
- Died: 1838 (aged 35–36); Bandar Aceh Darussalam, Sultanate of Aceh
- House: Aceh-Wajoq
- Father: Alauddin Jauharul Alam Syah
- Religion: Islam Sunni

Sultan Alauddin Muhammad Da'ud Syah I (1802 – 1838) was the thirty-first sultan of Aceh in northern Sumatra. He reigned from 1823 to 1838.

== Accession and consolidation of Aceh ==
The old sultan Alauddin Jauhar ul-Alam Syah had led a turbulent reign and was not recognized in all Aceh at his death in December 1823. He did not even control the capital Kutaraja. At his demise he left six children, two by the principal queen Puteri Siharibulan and four with other wives. His testament pointed out a six-years old son by the main wive called Abdul Muhammad. However, this was not accepted by Panglima Polem who headed the XXII Mukims, one of the three regions (sagi) of Aceh.

Instead a 22-year-old son from a co-wife, Tuanku Daud (also known as Tuanku Darid or Sultan Buyung), was appointed, supported by his grandmother Merah di Awan. His throne name was Sultan Alauddin Muhammad Da'ud Syah. His full brother Tuanku Ibrahim was appointed Raja Muda (junior king); he would be the main force at the Acehnese court up to 1870. A new civil war threatened to tear Aceh apart since Puteri Siharibulan refused to accept the decision. She made an appeal to the British in Penang and asked for intervention. However, at this time the British had no interest in the politics of Aceh. Puteri Siharibulan and Alauddin Muhammad Da'ud Syah were eventually reconciled via the mediation of the Raja Muda. The new sultan gradually gained acceptance from the panglima sagi (regional headmen), the orang kayas (grandees) and the uleëbalangs (chiefs).

== London Treaty ==
The British reluctance to intervene was related to the London Treaty of 17 March 1824 between the Netherlands and Great Britain. Britain, concerned with the power balance in Europe, did not want a weak Netherlands and agreed to demarcate the spheres of interest in the East Indies. The Melaka Straits would form the border between the spheres, meaning that there would be no British possessions on Sumatra, and no treaties with local states there. On the other hand, the British rights to Singapore and Melaka were stated. The Dutch diplomats promised to build up regular relations with Aceh to ensure security for sailors and merchants without abrogating its independence. The Acehnese authorities were not consulted on the matter but the treaty helped prolonging the independence of Aceh up to the 1870s.

== Conflicts and incidents ==
The following years were marked by a number of violent incidents, as a result of the Dutch expansion on Sumatra which broke the influence on the coasts that Aceh had gained during the Napoleonic Wars. In 1829 the Dutch tried to take control over Barus from the Acehnese but were stopped. The attempt was repeated in 1834, again without success. After the first Dutch advance an Acehnese force assaulted and invested the Dutch fort in Tapanuli. In 1830 the Dutch Resident on the west coast, MacGillavry, concluded a contract with the raja of Trumon which had hitherto been under the Aceh Sultanate but was now acknowledged as autonomous. Three years later the Dutch decided that the Singkil River would be considered the frontier between Aceh and the Dutch sphere on the west coast. Acehnese war-bands were involved in the Padri War where a staunchly Muslim Minangkabau faction (the Padris) fought the Dutch in West Sumatra. In 1831 Aierbangis and Natal were besieged by the Padris on the land side, and by the Acehnese from the sea. The attack was just barely beaten off.

A new crisis arose in 1836 when the Dutch schooner Dolfijn was captured by the Acehnese. The authorities in Batavia dispatched two envoys, Ritter and Van Loon, to Kutaraja in 1837. Their findings there indicated that the ship had been burnt and that the money and equipment on board had been appropriated by Alauddin Muhammad Da'ud Syah, although the sultan alleged something else.

== End of the reign ==
Alauddin Muhammad Da'ud Syah was not described as a very energetic ruler. He was sickly, smoked opium, and followed the guidance of his trustees. His reign nevertheless saw a lively economic activity. A large part of the world's pepper was produced in the sultanate and British, French and American merchants brought rich cargoes from the Acehnese ports. The Dutch did not fetch much advantage of the opportunities, either because the spirit of enterprise was lacking or since the Dutch did not have attractive barter goods at hand. The sultan died in 1838 and left a son who was still a child, Raja Sulaiman. The child was nominally enthroned as Alauddin Sulaiman Ali Iskandar Syah. However, the Raja Muda, Tuanku Ibrahim gained power as acting sultan and would hold the reins for the next 32 years.

== Literature ==
- Djajadiningrat, Raden Hoesein (1911) 'Critische overzicht van de in Maleische werken vervatte gegevens over de geschiedenis van het soeltanaat van Atjeh', Bijdragen tot de Taal-, Land- en Volkenkunde 65, pp. 135-265.
- Encyclopaedie van Nederlandsch-Indië (1917), Vol. 1. 's Gravenhage & Leiden: M. Nijhoff & Brill.
- Langen, K.F.H. van (1888), De inrichting van het Atjehsche staatsbestuur onder het sultanaat. 's Gravenhage: M. Nijhoff
- Lee Kam Hing (1995) The Sultanate of Aceh: Relations with the British, 1760-1824. Kuala Lumpur: Oxford University Press.
- Veth, P.J. (1873) Atchin en zijne betrekkingen tot Nederland. Leiden: G. Kolff.

Preceded by Alauddin Jauhar ul-Alam Syah	Sultan of Aceh Sultanate; 1823–1838	Succeeded by Alauddin Sulaiman Ali Iskandar Syah (de jure); Alauddin Ibrahim Mansur Syah (de facto)
