= Alauddin Ibrahim Mansur Syah =

Thirty-third sultan of Aceh

Alauddin Ibrahim Mansur Shah علاء الدين إبراهيم منصور شاه
- Sultan
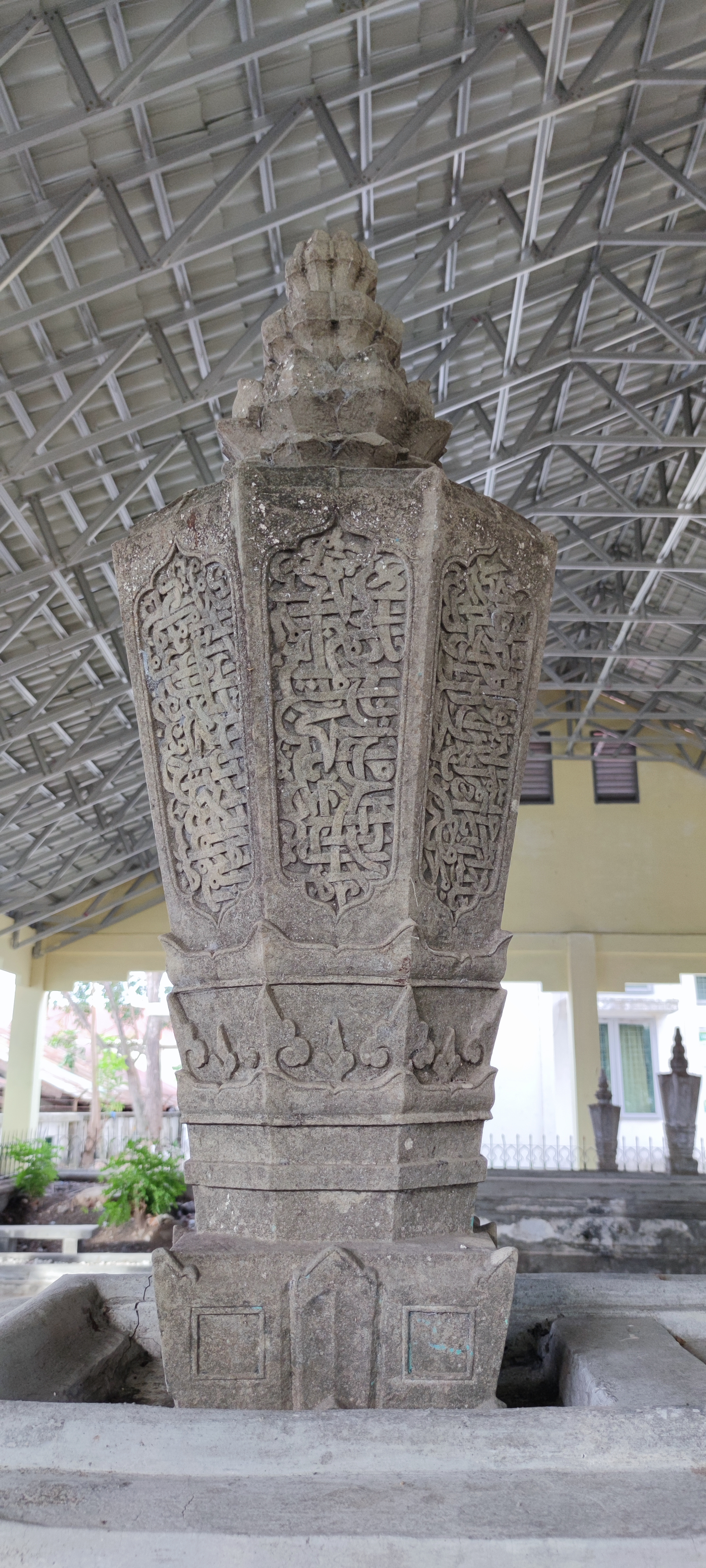
- Head Tombstone of Sultan Mansur Shah of Aceh

Sultan of Aceh
- Reign: 1857 - 1870
- Predecessor: Alauddin Sulaiman Ali Iskandar Shah
- Successor: Alauddin Mahmud Syah II
- Born: 1808; Bandar Aceh Darussalam, Aceh Sultanate
- Died: 1870 (aged 61–62); Bandar Aceh Darussalam, Aceh Sultanate
- Spouse: Pocut Rumoh Geudong, also known as Meurah Limpah or Pocut Lamseupeueng
- Issue: Tuanku Husain; Tuanku Zainul Abidin; Pocut Sri Banun
Regnal name
- Sri Sultan Alauddin Ali Ibrahim Mansur Shah Meureuhom Baro
- House: Aceh-Wajoq
- Father: Alauddin Jauharul Alam Syah
- Religion: Islam Sunni
- Penghargaan; Order of the Medjidie from Ottoman Empire

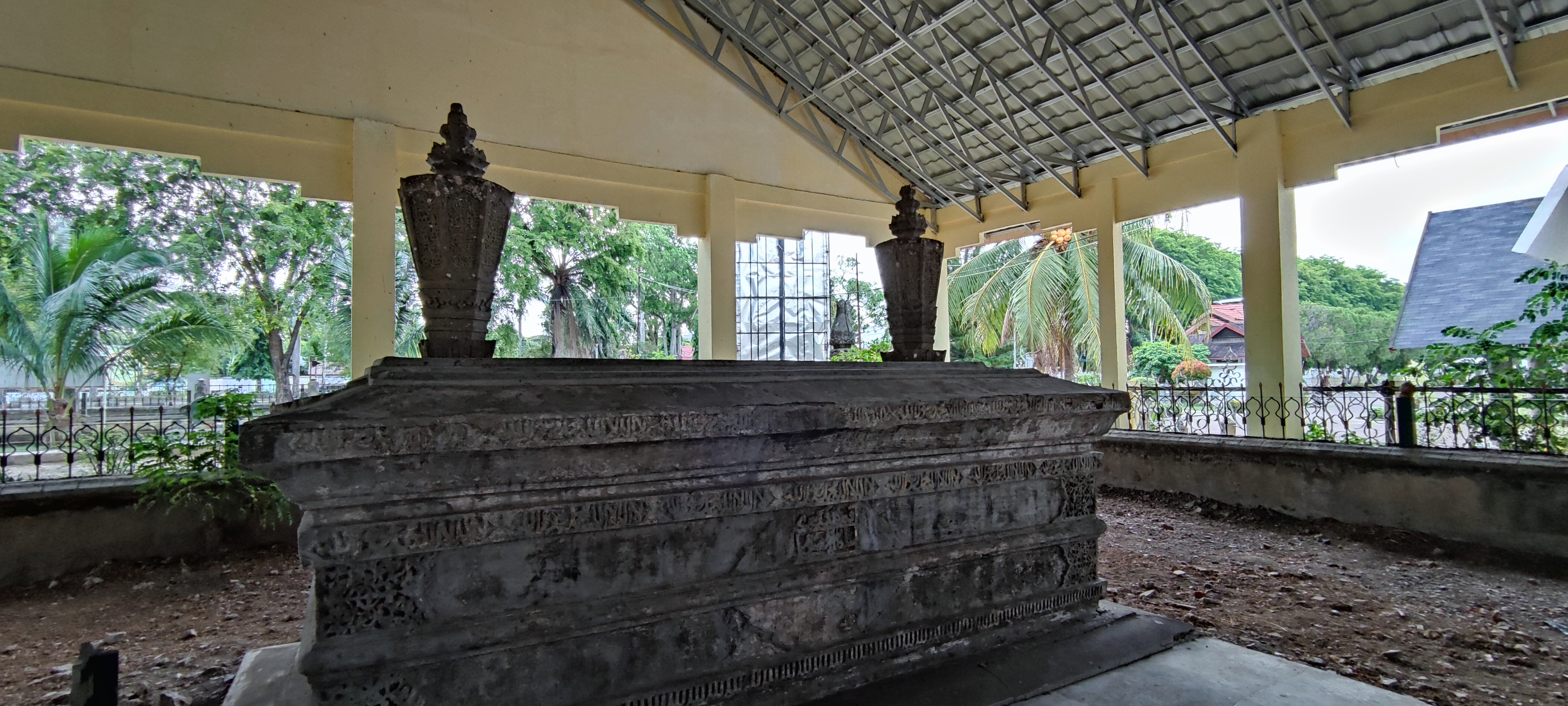
The tomb of Sultan Mansur Syah in Banda Aceh

Sultan Alauddin Ibrahim Mansur Syah, also known as Ali Alauddin Mansur Syah (died 1870) was the thirty-third sultan of Aceh in northern Sumatra. He was the eighth ruler of the House of Royal Buginese Wajoq-Aceh and ruled de facto from 1838, formally from 1857 to 1870.

== Rise to power ==
Originally called Tuanku Ibrahim, he was the son of Sultan Alauddin Jauhar ul-Alam Syah (1795–1823) and the full brother of Sultan Alauddin Muhammad Da'ud Syah I (1823–1838). When his brother gained the throne, Tuanku Ibrahim was made Raja Muda (junior raja) and was one of the main assistants to the relatively weak sultan. The latter was succeeded by a minor son, Alauddin Sulaiman Ali Iskandar Syah, in 1838. However, Tuanku Ibrahim immediately took power as the acting sultan; as such he was called Alauddin Ibrahim Mansur Syah. He tried to tighten the family ties to his nephew by giving him his daughter Sribanun to marry. At length that did not help.

== Overshadowing his nephew ==
Alauddin Ibrahim Mansur Syah is considered the most enterprising and forceful sultan to have ruled Aceh since the great days of the seventeenth century. The regional headmen (panglimas) and chiefs had considerable autonomy within the sultanate. A number of small "pepper rajas" ruled enclaves along the coast, boosted by the flourishing international pepper trade. The new acting sultan strove to bring a degree of cohesion and obedience among the components of the Sultanate. This cohesion was briefly threatened in the 1850s. The nominal sultan, his nephew Alauddin Sulaiman Ali Iskandar Syah, came to age by 1854 and demanded the prerogatives due to him. Alauddin Ibrahim Mansur Syah was unwilling to cede his powers and a bitter civil strife followed. The various panglimas and uleëbalangs chose sides in the conflict. However, Alauddin Ibrahim Mansur Syah was able to maintain the capital Kutaraja. When his nephew died in 1857, he was left the sole ruler and was secure on the throne until his demise in 1870. The economy expanded in his time. New pepper plantations were opened in the northeast, between Lhokseumawe and Tamiang, by 1850. Many labour migrants arrived from other parts of Aceh and several uleëbalangs benefited from the new commercial opportunities. The sultan provided lands and trading rights to uleëbalangs who supported him.

== Dutch advances ==
When Alauddin Ibrahim Mansur Syah came to power in 1838, the Dutch had just concluded the Padri War which greatly strengthened their position in West Sumatra. By the Anglo-Dutch Treaty of 1824 they were obliged to respect the independence of Aceh, but still encroached on the Acehnese sphere of influence on Sumatra's west coast. The important port Barus which had been tied to Aceh was captured by Dutch arms in 1839. Acehnese war-bands from Tapus and Singkil, presumably acting without the sultan's approval, staged a counter-attack on Barus which was beaten off. This triggered further Dutch action. Tapus was occupied without much resistance while Singkil was conquered by General Michiels after a sharp fight. An Acehnese attempt to retake Singkil in 1848 failed. On the east coast of Sumatra, the sultan tried to bind the principalities north of Siak to Aceh. According to Acehnese accounts he sent a fleet of 200 vessels down the east coast in 1853-54 which was successful in attaching Langkat, Serdang, Deli, Batubara and Asahan to the sultan's sphere of influence.

== Diplomatic measures ==
In view of the Dutch threat Alauddin Ibrahim Mansur Syah searched for allies among the great powers. He entrusted a wealthy pepper trader, Muhammad Ghauth who was going to Mecca on the hajj in 1849, with letters to Louis Philippe I of France and the Ottoman sultan and caliph. There were encouraging responses from both. Sultan Abdül Mecid I issued two decrees (firman), declaring Turkish protection over Aceh and confirming Alauddin Ibrahim Mansur Syah as a formal vassal. The subsequent Crimean War increased Acehnese and Malay enthusiasm for the Ottoman Empire.

Reports of Aceh's diplomatic efforts, together with a number of piratical incidents, caused the Dutch authorities to dispatch a man-of-war to Aceh in 1855 to regularize official relations. The meeting with Alauddin Ibrahim Mansur Syah went badly since the sultan felt insulted by the Dutch lack of respect for his dignity, and was on the brink of ending in bloodshed. In 1857 Aceh was again visited by a Dutch ship with an embassy headed by General Jan van Swieten. After a stormy round of negotiations a watered-down treaty of peace and friendship was concluded. However, it later came to the ears of the Dutch that the sultan had also asked the British governor of Singapore for advice in a tone hostile to the Dutch.

== Dispute over Sumatra's east coast ==
The treaty of 1857 contained little importance, and there were unsolved issues about the border between Aceh and the Dutch colonial state. The Dutch made a treaty with the Siak Sultanate in 1858 where the principalities of the east coast up to Tamiang were counted under Siak, in spite of Acehnese claims to some of the principalities, such as Tamiang and Langkat. Alauddin Ibrahim Mansur Syah was willing to negotiate the status of these areas. However, due to the slow response of the Dutch he took action of his own in 1863. Supported by Serdang and Asahan, his ships intimidated Deli and Langkat.

This was followed by an incident where some Chinese from Penang were murdered in Tamiang whose raja flew the Acehnese flag. A Dutch expedition in 1865 brought Asahan and Serdang to submission and punished the murderers in Tamiang whose Acehnese flag was lowered. Tamiang was henceforth considered by the Dutch to be a dependency of Siak, which was historically doubtful. However, no actual war broke out between Aceh and the Dutch colonial state, although relations were strained. Moreover, Aceh was disturbed by interior problems around 1870 since Lhokseumawe and Peusangan were hostile to the sultan. Europeans were advised not to visit the north coast and the trade suffered, so that the British Melaka Straits press called for intervention. In this troublesome situation Alauddin Ibrahim Mansur Syah died in 1870. His two sons Tuanku Husain and Tuanku Zainul Abidin had already died in 1869 and 1870, respectively. He was succeeded by his grandnephew Alauddin Mahmud Syah II.

== Literature ==
- Encyclopaedie van Nederlandsch-Indië (1917), Vol. 1. 's Gravenhage & Leiden: M. Nijhoff & Brill.
- Klerck, E.S. de (1975) History of the Netherlands East Indies. Amsterdam: B.M. Israël NV.
- Langen, K.F.H. van (1888), De inrichting van het Atjehsche staatsbestuur onder het sultanaat. 's Gravenhage: M. Nijhoff.
- Lee Kam Hing (2006) 'Aceh at the Time of the 1824 Treaty', in Anthony Reid (ed.), Veranda of Violence: The Background to the Aceh Problem. Singapore: NUS Press, pp. 72-95.
- Reid, Anthony (2010) 'Aceh and the Turkish Connection', in Arndt Graf et al. (eds), Aceh: History, Politics and Culture. Singapore: ISEAS, pp. 26-38.
- Veth, P.J. (1873) Atchin en zijne betrekkingen tot Nederland. Leiden: G. Kolff.
- Zainuddin, H.M. (1961) Tarich Atjeh dan Nusantara, Jilid I. Medan: Pustaka Iskandar Muda.

Preceded by Alauddin Muhammad Da'ud Syah I	Sultan of Aceh Sultanate; 1838–1870	Succeeded by Alauddin Mahmud Syah II
