= Alauddin Johan Syah =

Alauddin Johan Syah علاء الدين جوهان شاه
- Sultan
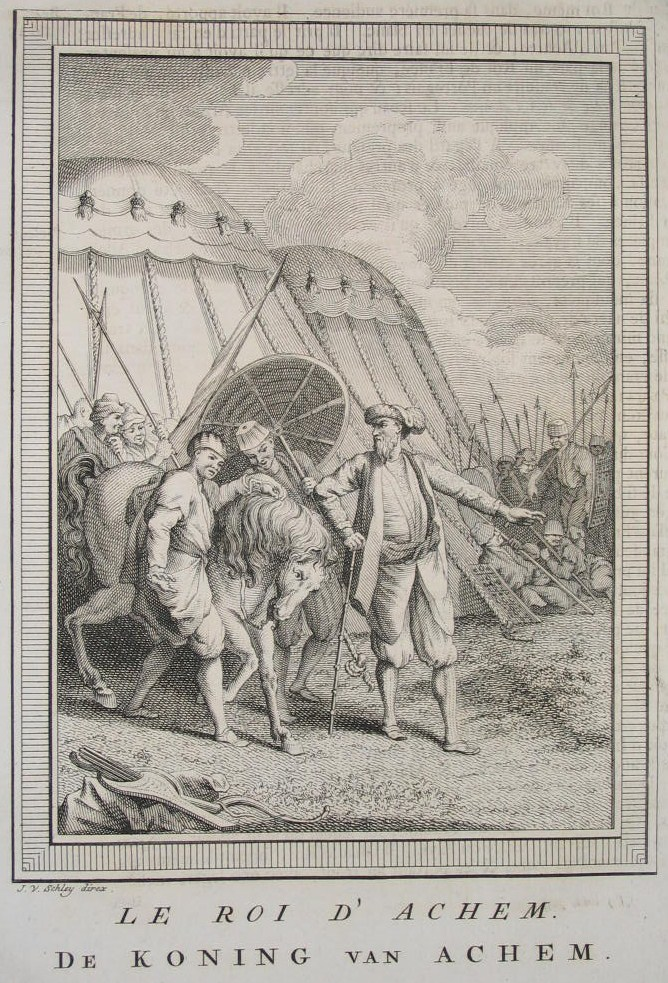
- Le roi d'Achem, sur l'île de Sumatra au XVIIIème siècle. Between 1730 and 1750.

Sultan of Aceh Sultanate
- Reign: 1735–1760
- Predecessor: Alauddin Ahmad Syah
- Successor: Alauddin Mahmud Syah I
- Born: Pocut Auk; Banda Aceh, Aceh Sultanate
- Died: 1760; Banda Aceh, Aceh Sultanate
- Issue: Alauddin Mahmud Syah I
- Father: Alauddin Ahmad Syah
- Religion: Islam

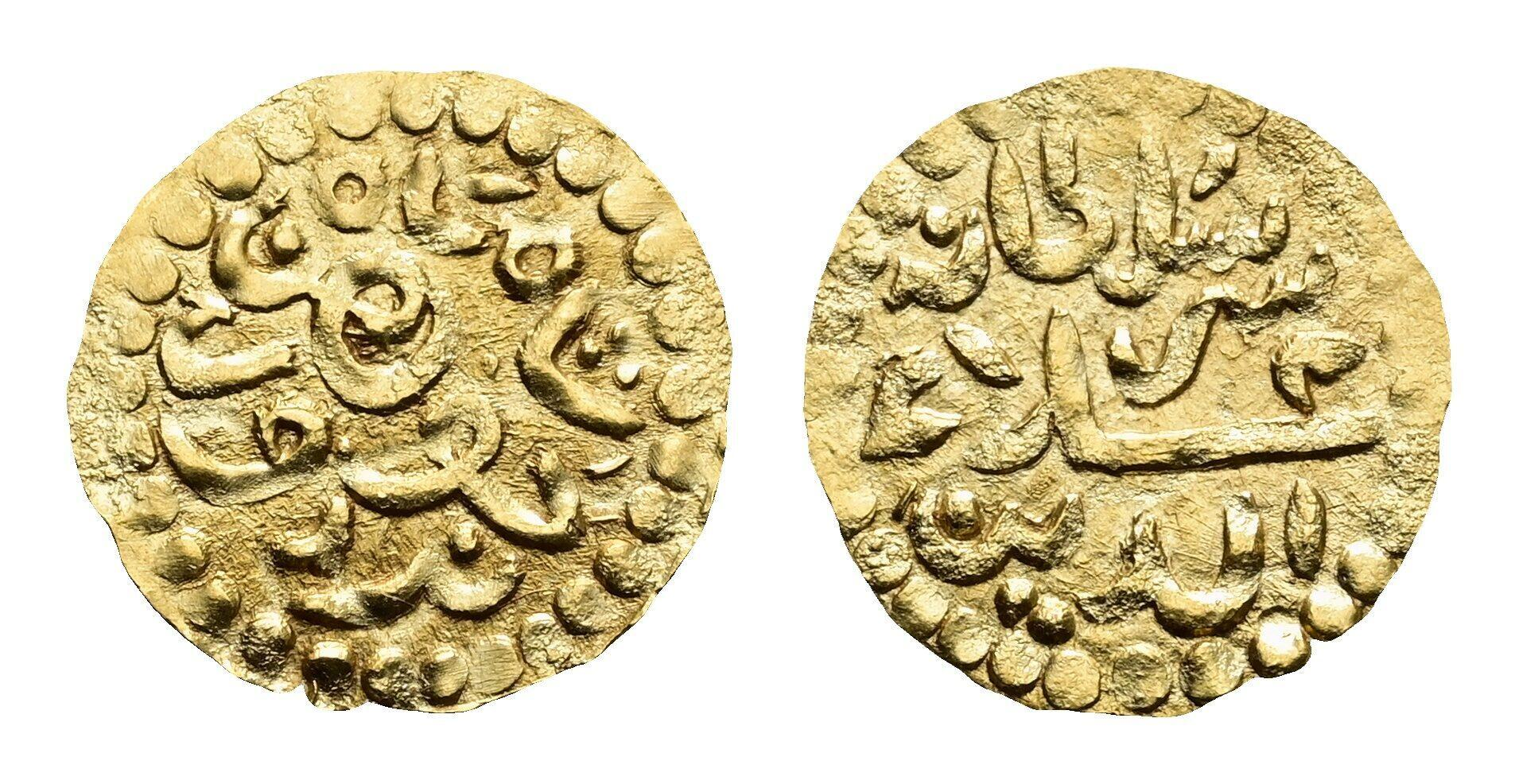
Coin of the Sultan of Aceh, Alauddin Johan Syah (1735-1760).

Sultan Alauddin Johan Syah (died 1760) was the twenty-fourth sultan of Aceh in northern Sumatra.

== Rivalry for the throne ==
Originally named Pocut Auk (or Pocut Uk), the future sultan was the eldest son of the preceding Sultan Alauddin Ahmad Syah. When the latter died in May or June 1735 the succession became contested. At this time, dynastic succession was not automatically from father to eldest son but was dependent on the approval of the three sagis (regions) of the kingdom. A previous sultan, Jamal ul-Alam Badr ul-Munir who had been deposed and exiled in 1726, now came forward and claimed the throne. Since Jamal ul-Alam was a sayyid, descendant of the Prophet, he carried a certain prestige. However, Purbawangsa, panglima (headman) of the XXV Mukims, one of the three Acehnese sagis, proclaimed Pocut Auk under the throne name Sultan Alauddin Johan Syah. Jamal ul-Alam was ensconced in the Baiturrahman Grand Mosque in the capital but was shot at from the fortress and withdrew to Kampong Jawa. While the XXII Mukims and XXV Mukims supported Sultan Alauddin Johan Syah, the XXVI Mukims supported Jamal ul-Alam.

== Exploits of Pocut Muhammad ==
The following civil war has been described in circumstantial detail in the Acehnese epic Hikayat Pocut Muhammad. The hero of the story, Pocut Muhammad, was the youngest brother of Sultan Alauddin. In spite of the sultan's admonitions not to attack a descendant of the Prophet, Pocut Muhammad went to Pidië and collected troops. His efforts were successful, and he returned to the area of the capital with a large army. Jamal ul-Alam was attacked at Kampong Jawa and suffered a complete defeat. By dressing in women's cloths he was able to sneak away, dying some time later in Kampong Kandang. Sultan Alauddin Johan Syah was now acknowledged by the three sagis. According to the various accounts, the civil war lasted for either four months or ten years. The dire economic consequences are mentioned in a Dutch report from April 1736: no ships from Aceh visited the important port town Barus in West Sumatra, "which was blamed on the demise of the king and the subsequent division of the kingdom between the son of the deceased and another one, who had previously ruled as king but had again been deposed."

== New uprisings ==
After the defeat of Jamal ul-Alam, Sultan Alauddin seems to have enjoyed a long and relatively peaceful reign. However, fresh trouble erupted in 1757 or 1759. One of the sagis, the XXII Mukims, was governed by the panglima Sri Muda Perkasa of the Panglima Polim line, descendants of Iskandar Muda. He was dissatisfied with the trading policy of the sultan who tried to redirect trade and the collection of duties to the capital Kutaraja. He unfolded the banner of rebellion and marched against the capital, allegedly supported by 20,000 men.

When he came to Lamsepong his troops came under fire from the sultan's soldiers. After having held out in Lamsepong for two months Sri Muda Perkasa withdrew. Meanwhile, the Seven Years' War between the European powers affected the East Indies. Already in 1750 a French fleet is reported to have sought shelter in Aceh, to the consternation of the British in India. Ten years later two French warships under Comte d'Estaing cooperated with the Panglima Laut (sea commander) of Aceh. Acenese vessels accompanied d'Estaing when he attacked and captured the British ports Natal and Tapanuli (Sumatra's west coast) in February 1760. This was a prelude to Acehnese attempts to regain their power on the west coast under the next reign.

The circumstances of Sultan Alauddin's demise are somewhat murky; according to at least one chronicle he was deposed by the panglimas, perhaps as a consequence of the rebellion of Sri Muda Perkasa. At any rate he died in late August 1760, leaving a son called Tuanku Raja. The latter was proclaimed sultan under the name Alauddin Mahmud Syah I but only found general acceptance in December in the same year.

== Literature ==
- Djajadiningrat, Raden Hoesein (1911) 'Critische overzicht van de in Maleische werken vervatte gegevens over de geschiedenis van het soeltanaat van Atjeh', Bijdragen tot de Taal-, Land- en Volkenkunde 65, pp. 135–265.
- Drewes, G.W.J. (1979) Hikajat Potjut Muhamat: An Achehnese Epic. The Hague: M. Nijhoff.
- Goor, R. van (1988) Generale missiven van Gouverneurs-Generaal en Raden aan Heren XVII der Verenigde Oostindische Compagnie. Vol. 9: 1729–1737. Den Haag: M. Nijhoff.
- Lee Kam Hing (1995) The Sultanate of Aceh: Relations with the British, 1760–1824. Kuala Lumpur: Oxford University Press.
- Taniputera, Ivan (2013) Kerajaan-kerajaan Nusantara pascakeruntuhan Majapahit. Jakarta: Gloria Group.

Preceded by Alauddin Ahmad Syah	Sultan of Aceh Sultanate; 1735–1760	Succeeded by Alauddin Mahmud Syah I
