= Alauddin Ahmad Syah =

18th century sultan of Sumatra

Alauddin Ahmad Syah علاء الدين أحمد شاه
- Sultan
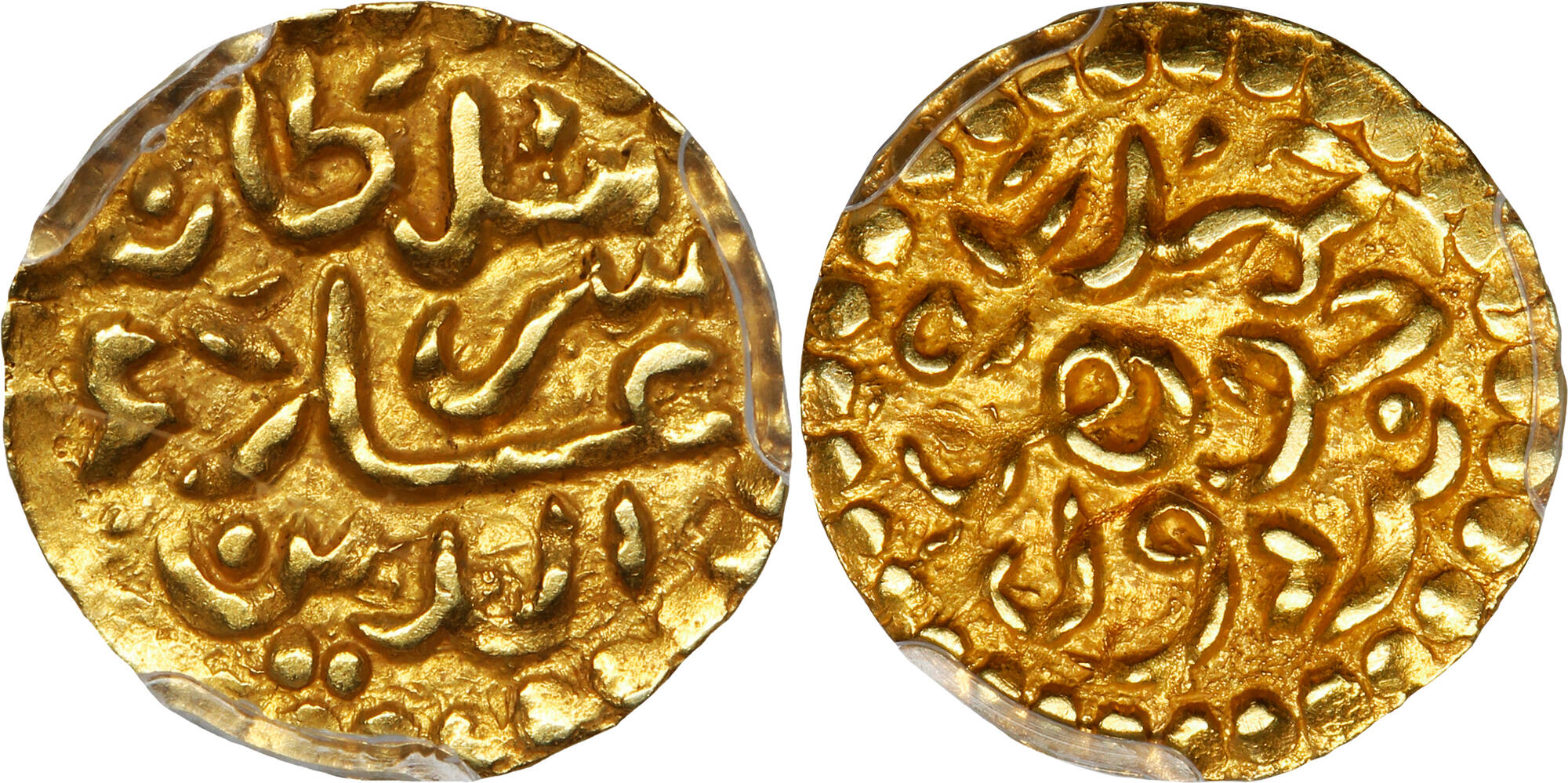
- Issue of the Sultanate of Aceh, struck in the name of the twenty third Sultan Alauddin Ahmad Shah (1727-1735)

Sultan of Aceh Sultanate
- Reign: 1727 – 1735
- Predecessor: Syamsul Alam
- Successor: Alauddin Johan Syah
- Born: Zainul Abidin; Banda Aceh, Aceh Sultanate
- Died: May or June 1735; Banda Aceh, Aceh Sultanate
- Issue: From chief consort: Pocut Auk; Pocut Muhammad; From co-wife: Pocut Kleng; Pocut Sandang
- Dynasty: Royal Buginese Wajoq-Aceh
- Father: Abdurrahim
- Religion: Islam

Sultan Alauddin Ahmad Syah (died 1735) was the twenty-third sultan of Aceh in northern Sumatra. He ruled from 1727 to 1735 and inaugurated the Bugis Dynasty of Aceh which would remain on the throne until the end of the sultanate in 1903.

== From official to sultan ==
The original name of the future sultan was Zainul Abidin. He was of Bugis stock; the Bugis from South Sulawesi migrated to all parts of the East Indian Archipelago after 1667 and were well regarded as traders, sailors and soldiers. His father Abdurrahim and grandfather Mansur had been respected men in the kingdom. Under the troubled reign of Jamal ul-Alam Badr ul-Munir (1703–1726) he served as an official with the title Maharaja Lela. According to one version he performed the hajj to Mecca but returned to Aceh in order to help his badly cornered master. When the three sagis (regions) of Aceh rebelled against Jamal ul-Alam in the fall of 1726, Maharaja Lela was ordered to hold the fortress of the capital until matters had been settled. However, Jamal ul-Alam had to flee in November and a period of chaos ensued. Meanwhile Maharaja Lela loyally held the fortress against the other parties and vainly asked Jamal ul-Alam, who had withdrawn to Pidië, for assistance. Finally, in January 1727 the three sagis unanimously offered the throne to Maharaja Lela. Since Maharaja Lela did not wish to commit treason, he sent message to Jamal ul-Alam and asked how to act. The ex-sultan, realizing that his case was lost, enjoined Maharaja Lela to accept the offer.

== House of Royal Buginese Wajoq-Aceh ==
Maharaja Lela now stepped on the throne under the name Sultan Alauddin Ahmad Syah. All his descendants on the throne bore reigning titles that included the name Alauddin ("nobility of faith"). After the enthronement the panglimas (headmen of the three sagis) returned to their respective regions. This made an end to the chaos that had reigned for some time. Batubara on the east coast, lost under Jamal ul-Alam, was regained for the time being. The Acehnese chronicles convey the impression that Alauddin Ahmad Syah's reign was relatively peaceful. This is not entirely confirmed by Dutch reports. In 1731 the Dutch found 15 ships with thousands of men lying in the Aceh River. "They had not arrived for any other reason than to settle certain disputes between two Acehnese kings who had waged war on each other for some time." The Dutch also worried about the support that the king of Aceh gave to a Minangkabau prince who tried to build a power base around the important port town Barus in 1734. On the other hand the reign of Alauddin Ahmad Syah saw some positive economic trends. Trade with the British in Madras took off again after a period of decline. This coincided with the rise in the British trade with China. Opium and cotton was sold to Aceh in exchange for Southeast Asian produce which was then brought to China. Products such as opium were so valuable in Aceh that the ruler could retail them for four times the price he had paid.

Sultan Alauddin Ahmad Syah sired four sons:

- Pocut Auk, later Sultan Alauddin Johan Syah, born from the chief consort
- Pocut Kleng, born from a co-wife
- Pocut Sandang, born from a co-wife
- Pocut Muhammad, born from the chief consort

The sultan died in late May or early June 1735. He had admonished his eldest son to respect the ex-sultan Jamal ul-Alam Badr ul-Munir. However, Jamal ul-Alam's political interference after his death led to a new spate of political infighting in Aceh.

== Literature ==
- Djajadiningrat, Raden Hoesein (1911) 'Critische overzicht van de in Maleische werken vervatte gegevens over de geschiedenis van het soeltanaat van Atjeh', Bijdragen tot de Taal-, Land- en Volkenkunde 65, pp. 135–265.
- Goor, R. van (1988) Generale missiven van Gouverneurs-Generaal en Raden aan Heren XVII der Verenigde Oostindische Compagnie. Vol. 9: 1729–1737. Den Haag: M. Nijhoff.
- Lee Kam Hing (1995) The Sultanate of Aceh: Relations with the British, 1760–1824. Kuala Lumpur: Oxford University Press.
- Zainuddin, H.M. (1961) Tarich Atjeh dan Nusantara, Jilid I. Medan: Pustaka Iskandar Muda.

Preceded by Syamsul Alam	Sultan of Aceh Sultanate; 1727 – 1735	Succeeded by Alauddin Johan Syah
