= Salahuddin of Aceh =

Sultan of Aceh (1530–1537/9)

Salahuddin Syah صلاح الدين شاه
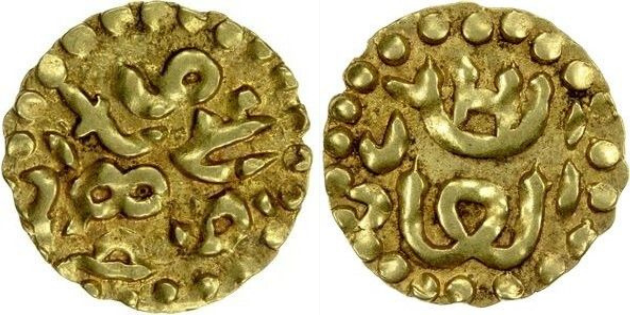
- Aceh coin from the era of Sultan Salahuddin (1530-1539).

Sultan of Aceh Sultanate
- Reign: 1530 – 1537 or 1539
- Coronation: 1530
- Predecessor: Ali Mughayat Syah
- Successor: Alauddin al-Qahhar
- Died: 25 November 1548; Bandar Aceh Darussalam
- House: Meukuta Alam
- Father: Sultan Syamsu Syah
- Mother: unnamed daughter of Inayat Syah
- Religion: Islam

Salahuddin (died 25 November 1548) was the second Sultan of Aceh Darussalam, reigning from 1530 to either 1537 or 1539. He was the eldest son of Sultan Ali Mughayat Syah, the founder of the Aceh Sultanate. His reign was characterized by weakness, and he was deposed by his ambitious younger brother, Alauddin al-Kahar.

== Accession ==
Salahuddin succeeded his father on the latter's death in August 1530. Sultan Ali Mughayat Syah was allegedly poisoned by his wife, Siti Hur, however there is no indication that Salahuddin was involved in this. According to the Hikayat Aceh, his mother had a strong hand in government. She appointed an Agha as regent of the kingdom with the title of Raja Bungsu. Salahuddin himself is described as an inept figure who did not care much about the governance of his kingdom. His brother Alauddin served as his deputy in Samudra Pasai which had been conquered by their father in 1524. There he gained a power base that would soon have dire consequences for the sultan.

Salahuddin's father Sultan Ali had been engaged in violent conflicts against the Portuguese in Malacca. Hostilities paused temporarily after his death. However, in September 1537 an Acehnese fleet appeared before Melaka, carrying a standing regiment of around 3,000 men. The Acehnese landed successfully but could not hold the fortress. After two days of ferocious fighting, they had to withdraw with great losses. Since the expedition is not mentioned in local chronicles, it is not entirely clear whether Salahuddin was still the ruler at this time. From the account of Fernão Mendes Pinto it appears that his brother "Alaradim" (Alauddin) was already on the throne by 1539. The much later chronicle Bustanus Salatin (c. 1640) alleges that Salahuddin lived for nine years after his deposition until his death in 1548. It is unclear whether he was deposed before or after the launch of the unsuccessful attack on Melaka. Hoesein Djajadiningrat believed that the coup came first and the attack was led by Alauddin al-Kahar, while Denys Lombard places the coup two years after the attack, which he believes was led by Salahuddin himself.

== Deposed from the sultanate ==
What is clear is the way that Salahuddin's reign ended. Alauddin arrived to the capital from Samudra Pasai with an entourage of 200 men, ostensibly to visit his father's grave. When he arrived he found that conditions at the court were just as bad as he heard, and decided to stage a coup. He dispatched four trusted retainers to supposedly return to Samudra. However, at Peudada they turned back and reached the gate of the palace compound during the night. They told the palace guards that Samudra had been unexpectedly attacked by soldiers from Aru (approximately the later Deli Sultanate). When he heard the noise, Raja Bungsu came outside and was taken along on Alauddin's elephant. They went to Kota Batu where Alauddin's men promptly murdered the regent. Sultan Salahuddin and the queen mother were then put in confinement. Alauddin al-Kahar took the throne and led a successful reign until 1571. According to the inscription on his grave, Salahuddin died on 25 November 1548.

== See also ==
- Acehnese–Portuguese conflicts

== Notes ==
Preceded by Ali Mughayat Syah	Sultan of Aceh Sultanate; 1530–1537/9	Succeeded by Alauddin al-Kahar
