= Alauddin Mahmud Syah I =

Sultan of Aceh

Alauddin Mahmud Syah I علاء الدين محمود شاه
- Sultan
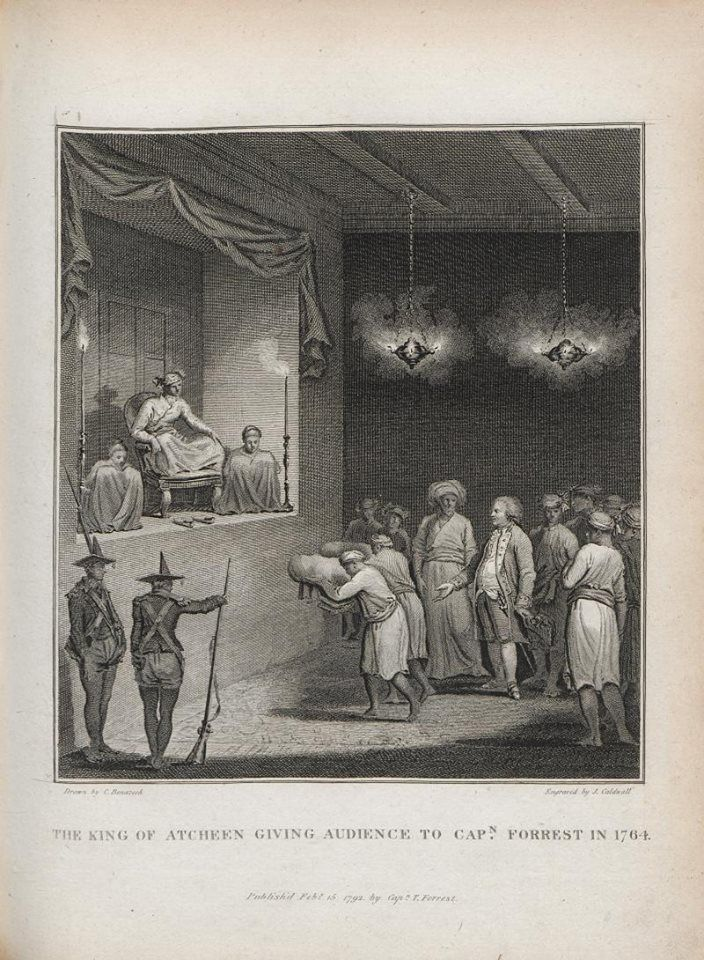
- Sultan Mahmud Shah I with foreign representatives at the Palace. Illustration by Thomas Forrest, 1764.

Sultan of Aceh First Period
- Reign: 1760-1764
- Predecessor: Alauddin Johan Syah
- Successor: Alauddin Badruddin Johan Syah (1764)

Second Period
- Reign: 1765-Mai 1773
- Predecessor: Alauddin Mahmud Syah I
- Successor: Alauddin Sulaiman Syah (1773)

Third Period
- Reign: June 1773-1781
- Predecessor: Alauddin Mahmud Syah I
- Successor: Alauddin Muhammad Syah (1781)
- Born: Pocut Bangta; Bandar Aceh Darussalam, Aceh Sultanate
- Died: 1781; Bandar Aceh Darussalam, Aceh Sultanate
- House: Aceh-Wajoq
- Father: Alauddin Johan Syah
- Religion: Islam Sunni

Sultan Alauddin Mahmud Syah I (died 1781) was the twenty-fifth sultan of Aceh in northern Sumatra. He ruled from 1760 to 1781, although his reign was twice interrupted by usurpers (1764–1765, 1773).

== Troubled enthronement ==
Known in his youth as Tuanku Raja or Pocut Bangta, he was the son of the preceding Sultan Alauddin Johan Syah and a lady from the Asahan Sultanate. His father encountered internal opposition towards the end of his reign and died in August 1760. Tuanku Raja was proclaimed sultan under the name Alauddin Mahmud Syah. However, not all the regions heeded his claim. People from the XXII Mukims (one of the three regions or sagis of Aceh) held the prestigious Baiturrahman Grand Mosque in the capital and opposed the new sultan. They were eventually driven out by force. It was only in December 1760 that all the three sagis agreed to acknowledge Alauddin Mahmud Syah. The most influential person at the court was Mantri Makota Raja, a scion of the sultan's family of Siak Sri Indrapura who handled affairs on behalf of the young ruler.

According to the account of the British navigator Thomas Forrest the sultan's relationship with the orang kayas (grandees) was poor during his first years. The sultan tried to control trade and circumcise the powers of the orang kaya. This had worked during the heyday of the sultanate in the seventeenth century, but at this time it created internal instability. On the other hand, he had ambitions to expand the influence of Aceh along the west coast which had once belonged to the sultanate. Events in the mid-eighteenth century also gave an upswing to Aceh's economic role: The British were established in the Sumatran ports Natal and Tapanuli in 1751 and 1756 in order to support the pepper trade of Bengkulu. The French also sought good relations with Aceh. The period therefore saw an increasing number of European ships and traders visiting the coast of Aceh. The ships often purchased pepper and other local products in local ports rather than via the capital Kutaraja.

== First expulsion ==
Disturbances broke out in 1763. The background was the inner tensions in the sultanate; the ruler tried to control commercial activities in the various parts of his kingdom without having the bureaucratic apparatus to implement this, which enraged the chiefs. The uprising led to the expulsion of Alauddin Mahmud Syah in the following year. Mantri Makota Raja was made sultan under the name Badr ul-Alam Syah. Alauddin Mahmud Syah escaped to Kota Musapi by the coast where he was assisted by a cleric, qadi Malik ul-Adil. With the help of the qadi he attacked Badr ul-Alam Syah and managed to kill him in August 1765. The sultan was thus restored in his dignity, although his position was considerably weakened. His elder son Muhammad was later on married to the daughter of Badr ul-Alam Syah, apparently as an attempt of reconciliation between the political factions of Aceh.

== Second expulsion ==
Alauddin Mahmud Syah remained undisturbed in his governance for some years. The British negotiated about trading conditions in 1767, 1771 and 1772–73, and found the sultan to be a weak and capricious type. Meanwhile, the Acehnese panglima laut (sea commander) continued to expand the influence of the sultanate on the northern west coast. Some port towns were blockaded and the Dutch garrison in Barus was attacked in 1771. However, the inner cohesion of the state was once again declining. When Thomas Forrest returned to Aceh in 1772 he found an agitated situation. As he reported, discontent groups of people sometimes appeared threateningly outside the palace compound in the night. At this time the palace was guarded by a corps of sepoys under an Indian from Cuddalore, which had been provided by the British in Madras. In April 1773 the XXII Mukims and XXV Mukims rose against him. In his stead an official called Raja Udahna Lela was placed on the throne under the name Sultan Sulaiman Syah. However, he only lasted for two months before Alauddin Mahmud Syah returned with his adherents and expelled the usurper. After this he remained in power until his death in June 1781. There were suspicions that he may have been poisoned. The sultan left two sons, Tuanku Muhammad and Tuanku Cut, of which the former succeeded him as Alauddin Muhammad Syah.

== Literature ==
- Djajadiningrat, Raden Hoesein (1911) 'Critische overzicht van de in Maleische werken vervatte gegevens over de geschiedenis van het soeltanaat van Atjeh', Bijdragen tot de Taal-, Land- en Volkenkunde 65, pp. 135–265.
- Lee Kam Hing (1995) The Sultanate of Aceh: Relations with the British, 1760–1824. Kuala Lumpur: Oxford University Press.
- Zainuddin, H.M. (1961) Tarich Atjeh dan Nusantara, Jilid I. Medan: Pustaka Iskandar Muda.

Preceded by Alauddin Johan Syah	Sultan of Aceh; 1760–1781	Succeeded by Alauddin Muhammad Syah
