= Badr ul-Alam Syah =

Sultan of Aceh in Northern Sumatra (1764-1765)

Sultan Badr ul-Alam Syah (died 1765) was the twenty-sixth sultan of Aceh in northern Sumatra. He usurped the throne from the House of Royal Buginese Wajoq-Aceh and ruled from 1764 to 1765.

When Sultan Alauddin Johan Syah died in 1760, his son and successor Alauddin Mahmud Syah I was still young. An official called Maharaja Labui or Mantri Makota Raja was therefore acting as regent, taking care of the affairs. This person was descended from the sultan's family of Siak though the exact link is not clear. Siak had risen to become an important power on the east coast of Sumatra in the eighteenth century. In 1763 disturbances broke out in the Aceh sultanate, presumably as a consequence of the sultan's unpopular attempts to control trade. The details are not entirely clear, but in 1764 Alauddin Mahmud Syah I was driven from the capital and Mantri Makota Raja took the throne in February of that year under the name Sultan Badr ul-Alam Syah. However, the expelled sultan was able to build up a new base at Kota Musapi with the help of an influential qadi, Malik ul-Adil. Badr ul-Alam Syah was attacked by the exile's adherents and killed in August 1765. Alauddin Mahmud Syah was once again placed on the throne. Badr ul-Alam had a daughter, Merah di Awan, who was later married to Alauddin Mahmud Syah's eldest son in an attempt to reconcile the families. Her son later became sultan under the name Alauddin Jauhar ul-Alam Syah

== Literature ==
- Djajadiningrat, Raden Hoesein (1911) 'Critische overzicht van de in Maleische werken vervatte gegevens over de geschiedenis van het soeltanaat van Atjeh', Bijdragen tot de Taal-, Land- en Volkenkunde 65, pp. 135-265.
- Lee Kam Hing (1995) The Sultanate of Aceh: Relations with the British, 1760-1824. Kuala Lumpur: Oxford University Press.
- Zainuddin, H.M. (1961) Tarich Atjeh dan Nusantara, Jilid I. Medan: Pustaka Iskandar Muda.

Preceded by Alauddin Mahmud Syah I	Sultan of Aceh; 1764-1765	Succeeded by Alauddin Mahmud Syah I
