= Aceh Sultanate =

Historic state based in northern Sumatra, Indonesia (1496–1904)

Kingdom of Aceh Darussalam Keurajeuën Acèh Darussalam (Acehnese) کراجاءن اچيه دارالسلام
- 1480–1904
- Flag Coat of arms
- Motto: عادت بئ ڤو تمرهوم، حكم بئ شياه كوالا، قانون بئ ڤوتري ڤهڠ، رسام بئ لقسامان; Adat bak Po Teumeureuhom, hukom bak Syiah Kuala, Qanun bak Putroe Phang, reusam bak Lakseumana; "Customs reside with the Sovereign, Law resides with Syiah Kuala, Statutes reside with Princess Pahang, Tradition resides with the Admiral."
- Map of the Aceh Sultanate in 1629

- Development of the Aceh Sultanate over time
- Status: Vassal of the Pedir Kingdom (1497–1514); Protectorate of the Ottoman Empire (1569–1903)
- Capital: Kutaraja or Bandar Aceh Darussalam (modern Banda Aceh) (1496–1874); Pagar Ayer (1875–1878); Indrapuri (1878–1879); Keumala (1879–1898); Kuta Sawang (1898); Batee Illiek-Samalanga (1898–1901); Loyang Sekam-Laut (1901–1903)
- Common languages: Acehnese, Malay, Arabic, and other local languages
- Other languages: Ottoman Turkish; Persian; Dutch
- Religion: Sunni Islam
- Demonym: Acehnese
- Government: Centralized absolute monarchy (c. 1496–1641) Absolute monarchy under the Sultanahs (1641–1699) Decentralized / quasi-confederate sultanate under powerful uleebalang federations (1699–1873) Wartime monarchy during the Aceh War (1873–1903) Aceh under the Wali Negara, Uleebalang Federations, Nominal monarchy amid continued resistance (1903–1914)
- Sultan
  - 1465–1496 (first): Muzaffar Syah/Syamsu Syah
  - 1514–1530 (the unifier): Ali Mughayat Syah
  - 1607–1636 (peak of expansion): Iskandar Muda
  - 1875–1903 (last): Alauddin Muhammad Daud Syah II
- Grand Vizier
  - 1496–1523 (first): Raja Ibrahim
  - 1878–1894 (last): Tuanku Hasyim Banta Muda
- History
  - Founded (Note: The conquest of the Darul Kamal dynasty by Meukuta Alam under Muzaffar Syah): 1480
  - Vassal of the Pedir Kingdom (Note: Sultan Ma'ruf Syah of Pedir conquered Aceh, and Sultan Syamsu Syah of Aceh was exiled): 1497
  - The Unification of Aceh under Ali Mughayat Syah: c. 1514–1530
  - Acehnese–Portuguese conflicts: 1519–1639
  - The Resurrection of Alauddin al-Qahhar: 1607–1636
  - Expansion under Iskandar Muda: 1607–1636
  - Reign of the Queens (Sultanahs): 1641–1699
  - Decline of central authority: 18th century
  - Succession crisis: 1764–1773
  - Acehnese civil war (Note: Acehnese civil war between Alauddin Jauhar ul-Alam Syah and Syarif Saiful Alam Syah): 1814–1819
  - Aceh War: 1873–1914
  - The dissolution of the Aceh Sultanate by the Dutch: 1904
- Currency: Native gold and silver coins (Dinar and Deureuham), Keuëh, Kupang
Preceded by
Samudera Pasai Sultanate
Kingdom of Pedir
Kingdom of Lambri
Kingdom of Daya
Kingdom of Linge
Kingdom of Tamiang
Aru kingdom
Hatorusan
Sultanate of Johor
Sultanate of Deli
Sultanate of Pahang
Sultanate of Perak
Sultanate of Kedah
Banua Nias
Inderapura Kingdom
Anak Sungai Kingdom
Sungai Serut Kingdom
Kingdom of Palembang
Nakhon Si Thammarat Kingdom
Kingdom of Indragiri
Kingdom of Jambi
Succeeded by
Dutch East Indies
Aceh under the Wali Negara
Ulèëbalang Federations - Feudal Lords of Aceh
Chiefdoms of Kejurun Gayo-Alas
Chiefdoms of Karo and Simalungun
- Today part of: Indonesia; Malaysia; Thailand; Singapore

The Aceh Sultanate, officially the Kingdom of Aceh Darussalam (Acehnese: Acèh Darussalam; Jawoe: اچيه دارالسلام), was a sultanate centered in the modern-day province of Aceh of Indonesia. It was a major regional power in the 16th and 17th centuries, before experiencing a long period of decline. Its capital was Kutaraja, the present-day Banda Aceh. Along with Mataram and Makassar, it has been referred to as one of Southeast Asia's major "gunpowder empires".

At its peak it competed with the Sultanate of Johor and Portuguese Malacca, both on the Malay Peninsula, as all three attempted to control the trade through the Strait of Malacca and the regional exports of pepper and tin, with varying success. In addition to its considerable military strength, the court of Aceh became a noted center of Islamic scholarship and trade.

== Etymology ==
The name ‘Aceh’ is one of the most significant historical place names in the Southeast Asian region, particularly in the northern tip of the island of Sumatra. In historical, philological and linguistic studies, there is no single, universally accepted explanation for the origin of this name. Rather, the term “Aceh” is the result of a lengthy process involving the interaction between local traditions, foreign influences, and historical dynamics spanning centuries. Consequently, the etymological investigation of this name must be understood within a multidisciplinary framework encompassing textual sources, oral traditions, and historical reconstruction.

From a scientific and historical perspective, the region now known as Aceh was not always referred to by that name in its early days. Ancient sources from Arabia, India and China recorded this region under various names, such as Lamri, Lamuri, Lambri or Ramni. These names referred to an important port on the northern coast of Sumatra that formed part of the Indian Ocean’s international trade network. Subsequently, as European nations began to enter the region in the 16th century, changes occurred in the naming of the area. Portuguese writers such as Tomé Pires, in his work Suma Oriental, recorded the name as “Achin”, which was subsequently followed by other variations such as Achen, Acheh, Atchin, and Atjeh in Dutch and English sources. This transformation indicates that the modern name “Aceh” is the result of a cross-linguistic phonetic transliteration process applied to a pre-existing local sound.

From a philological perspective, the presence of the local form “Acèh” in classical manuscripts provides important clues regarding the authenticity of the name. In texts such as the Hikayat Aceh, the name Aceh is written in Jawi script as “اچه”, which phonetically approximates the modern pronunciation. This fact reinforces the assumption that “Aceh” is an endonym, that is, a name originating from the local community itself, rather than being entirely the result of external naming. Variations such as Achin or Atjeh in foreign sources are more accurately understood as phonetic adaptations of the local term, rather than its origin.

In addition to historical and philological approaches, there are also various theories of comparative etymology that attempt to explain the origin of the word ‘Aceh’ through its connections with other languages. One theory links this name to Arabic, given the strong influence of Islam in the territory of the Sultanate of Aceh Darussalam since the 16th century. Some interpretations link it to terms such as “Ājī” or “Asyi”, which are associated with the meaning of glory or the eastern region. However, philologically speaking, this connection lacks strong textual evidence in classical Arabic sources, and is therefore more accurately regarded as an unverified hypothesis.

Another theory links the name Aceh to Indian or Sanskrit influences, given the intensity of trade relations between this region and the Indian subcontinent since early times. In this context, forms such as ‘Achin’ are sometimes thought to have a possible connection with certain terms in ancient Indian languages. However, the linguistic evidence supporting this theory remains limited and does not indicate a clear etymological link. Similarly, in ancient Chinese records, the region is referred to by forms such as “A-tsin” or other variations, which are most likely the result of phonetic transcription of local sounds, rather than a representation of the word’s actual origin.

== History ==
=== Foundation, rise and trade development ===
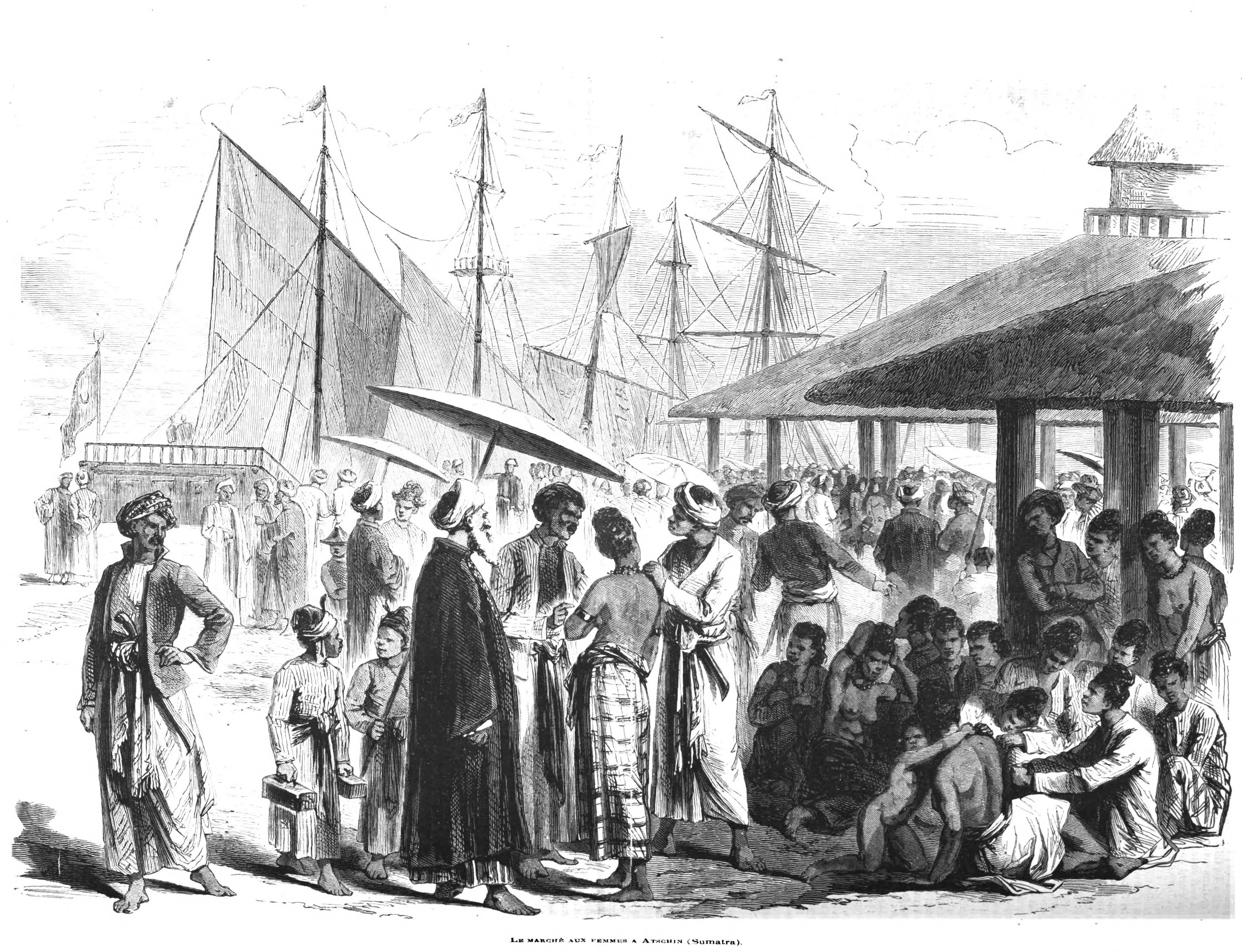
Slave market in Aceh, illustration from 1873

The sultanate was founded by Ali Mughayat Syah, who began campaigns to extend his control over northern Sumatra and the Indonesia in 1520. His conquests included Deli, Pedir, and Pasai, and he attacked Aru. His son Alauddin al-Kahar (d. 1571) extended the domains further south into Sumatra, but was less successful in his attempts to gain a foothold across the strait, though he made several attacks on both Johor and Malacca, with the support along with men and firearms from Suleiman the Magnificent's Ottoman Empire. The Ottoman Empire sent a relief force of 15 Xebecs commanded by Kurtoğlu Hızır Reis.

Aceh formed the northern tip of Sumatra at the southeast corner of the Bay of Bengal. Ships from the Bengal Sultanate transported diplomats from Sumatra and Brunei to Ming China.

On 21 June 1599 a Dutch captain, Cornelius de Houtman, arrived at "Acheen" aboard the Lioness as the first of three planned voyages to the East Indies. The crew stayed for three months arrogating pepper and other spices. British crew member John Davis claims the party was subsequently attacked by the local warlord with the loss of 68 dead and captured. After they arrived, they were permitted by the sultan to purchase pepper, during the same year as representatives of the English East India Company under the command of James Lancaster. He returned in 1602 bearing a letter from English queen Elizabeth I.

The tenth sultan from 1589 to 1604 was Alauddin Ri'ayat Shah. Internal dissension in the sultanate prevented another powerful sultan from appearing until 1607 when his grandson Iskandar Muda came to the position. He extended the sultanate's control over most of Sumatra. He also conquered Pahang, a tin-producing region of the Malay Peninsula, and was able to force the sultans of Johor to recognise his overlordship, if temporarily. During his reign, he created a code of laws known as Adat Meukuta Alam (Adat meaning "customs", or "customary rules"). The strength of his formidable fleet was brought to an end with a disastrous campaign against Malacca in 1629 when the combined Portuguese and Johor forces managed to destroy all his ships and 19,000 troops according to Portuguese account. Aceh's forces were not destroyed, however, as Aceh was able to conquer Kedah within the same year and taking many of its citizens to Aceh. The sultan's son-in-law, Iskandar Thani, former prince of Pahang later became his successor. During his reign, Aceh focused on internal consolidation and religious unity.

After the reign of Sultan Iskandar Thani, Aceh was ruled by a series of female sultana. Aceh's previous policy of taking hostages from conquered kingdoms' population made them eager to seek independence, the results were Aceh's control weakened while regional rulers gained effective power. The sultan ultimately became a largely symbolic title. By the 1680s, a Persian visitor could describe a northern Sumatra where "every corner shelters a separate king or governor and all the local rulers maintain themselves independently and do not pay tribute to any higher authority." As a result of these internal conflicts and the resurgence of Johor, Aceh transitioned from being the head of the Malay world to focusing inward, adopting a more prominent Acehnese identity.

=== Later years and conquest by the Dutch ===
In 1699, Sultan Badr al-alam Syarif Hasyim Jamal ad-din ascended to the throne, the first male to rule in almost 60 years. He was succeeded by several short-lived rulers, and in 1727 a member of the Buginese dynasty, Sultan Ala ad-din Ahmad Shah took power. The coming to power of a Bugis dynasty strengthened Acehnese identity in-contrast to the Bugis of Johor, which emphasized their connections to Malay culture. In the late 18th and early 19th centuries, Koh Lay Huan – the first Kapitan Cina of Penang, had good contacts with the English-and-French-speaking sultan of Aceh, Jauhar al-Alam. The sultan allowed Koh to gather pepper plants in Aceh to begin pepper cultivation in Penang. Later, about 1819, Koh helped Sultan Jauhar al-Alam put down a rebellion by Acehnese territorial chiefs.

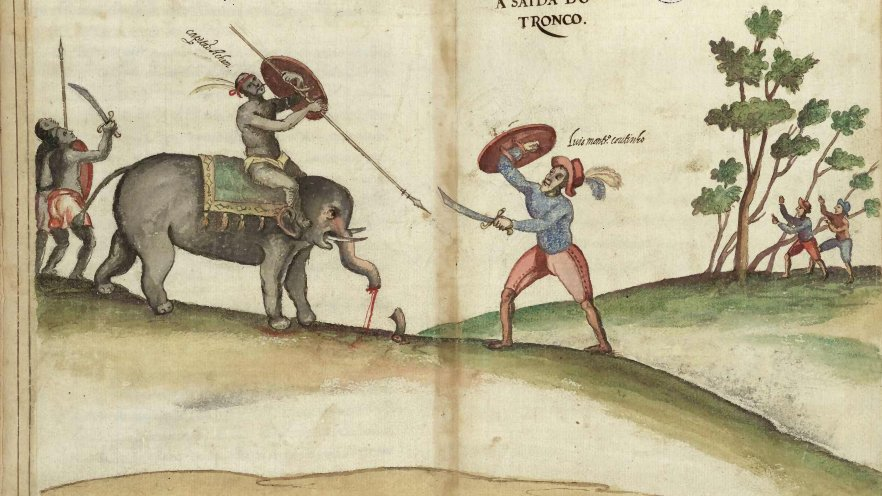
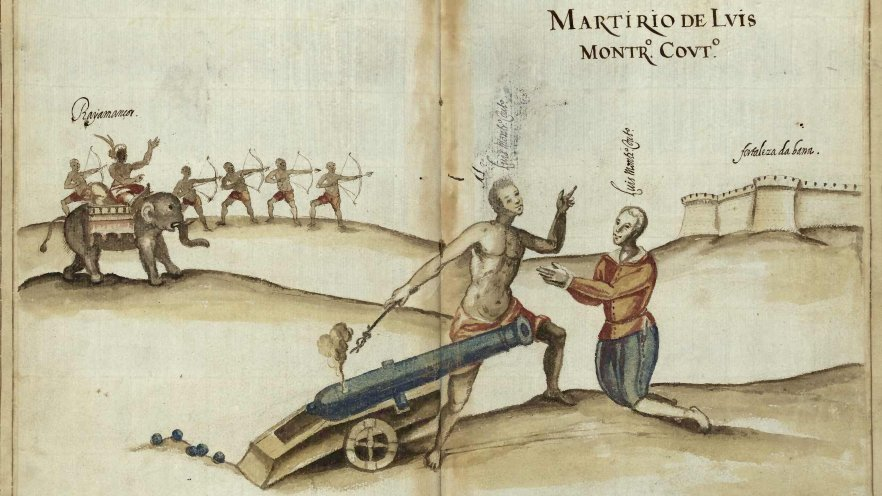
Acehnese troops (left) battling the Portuguese

In the 1820s, as Aceh produced over half the world's supply of pepper, a new leader, Tuanku Ibrahim, was able to restore some authority to the sultanate and gain control over the "pepper rajas" who were nominal vassals of the sultan by playing them off against each other. He rose to power during the sultanate of his brother, Muhammad Syah, and was able to dominate the reign of his successor Sulaiman Syah (r. 1838–1857), before taking the sultanate himself, under the title Sultan Ali Alauddin Mansur Syah (1857–1870). He extended Aceh's effective control southward at just the time when the Dutch were consolidating their holdings northward.

Britain, heretofore guarding the independence of Aceh to keep it out of Dutch hands, re-evaluated its policy and concluded the Anglo-Dutch Treaty of Sumatra, which allowed for Dutch control throughout Sumatra in exchange for concessions in the Gold Coast and equal trading rights in northern Aceh. The treaty was tantamount to a declaration of war on Aceh, and the Aceh War followed soon after in 1873, with the Dutch making the unfounded excuses that Aceh was sponsoring piracy and preparing to conclude a treaty with the United States. As the Dutch prepared for war, Mahmud Syah (1870–1874) appealed for international help, but no one was willing or able to assist.

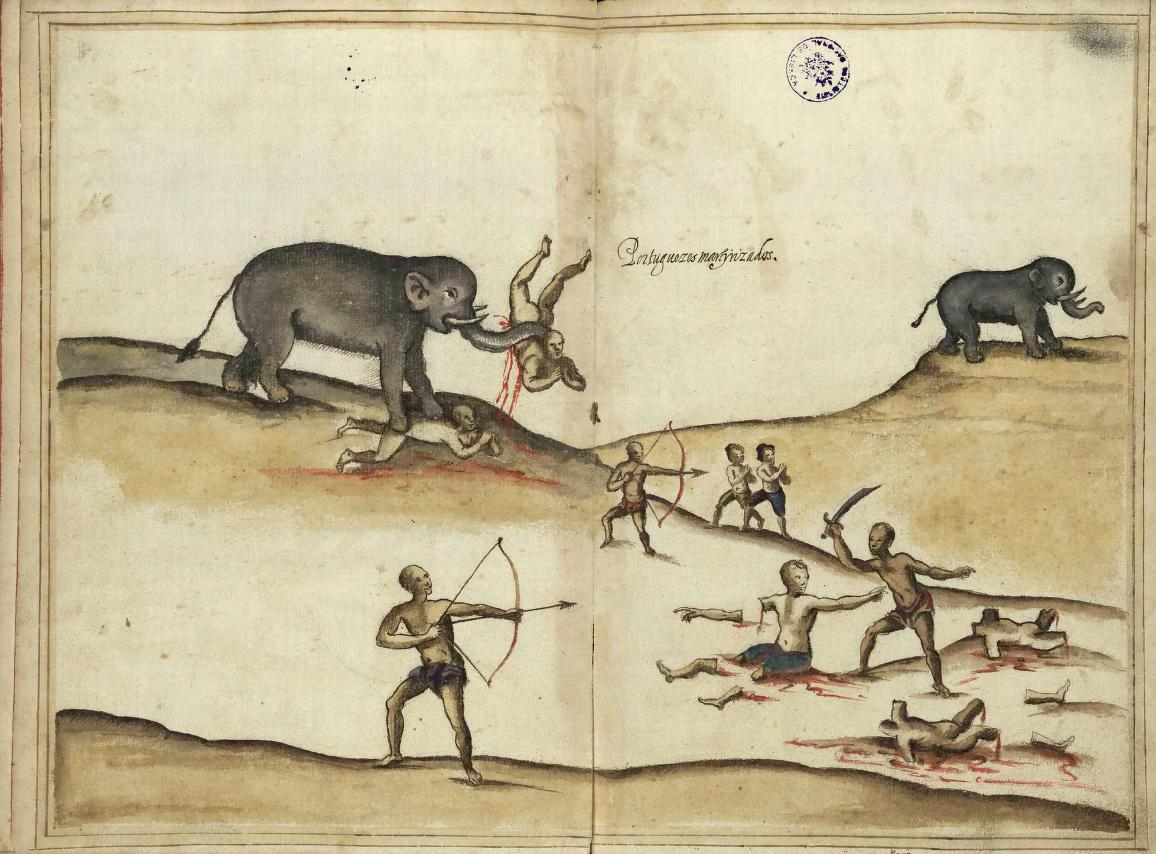
The execution of Portuguese prisoners in Aceh, 1588

In early 1874 the sultan abandoned the capital after the palace was captured on 31 January, withdrawing to the hills, while the Dutch announced the annexation of Aceh. He would die of cholera, as did many combatants on both sides, but the Acehnese proclaimed a grandson of Tuanku Ibrahim sultan. The local rulers of Acehnese ports nominally submitted to Dutch authority to avoid a blockade, but they used their income to support the resistance.

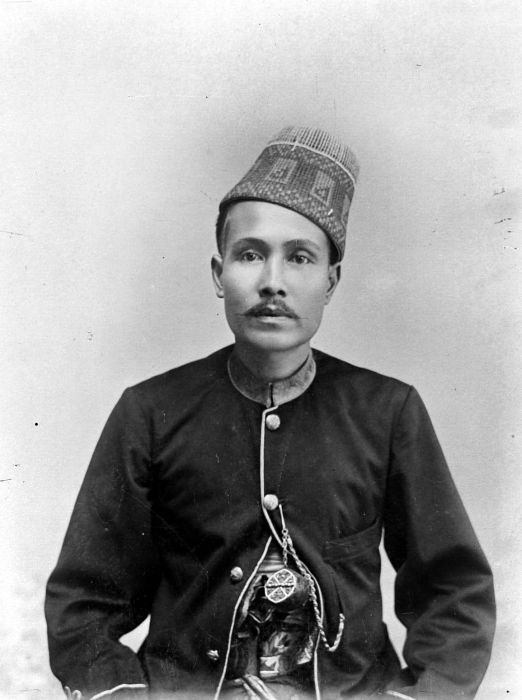
Alauddin Muhammad Da'ud Syah II, the last Sultan of Aceh who was active in the late-19th century

During this time, many Acehan politicians sought aid from the Ottoman Empire. Their efforts were futile, but they did serve to inspire resistance movements across south-east Asia. Local resistance in northern Sumatra then passed to the local lords and potentates, and then to the religious leaders. However, an adviser of the sultan, Abd al-Rahman al-Zahir, soon returned to take command of the independence movement, fell out with the revolutionary leaders, and promptly agreed to surrender himself to the Dutch in exchange for a lifetime pension in Mecca.

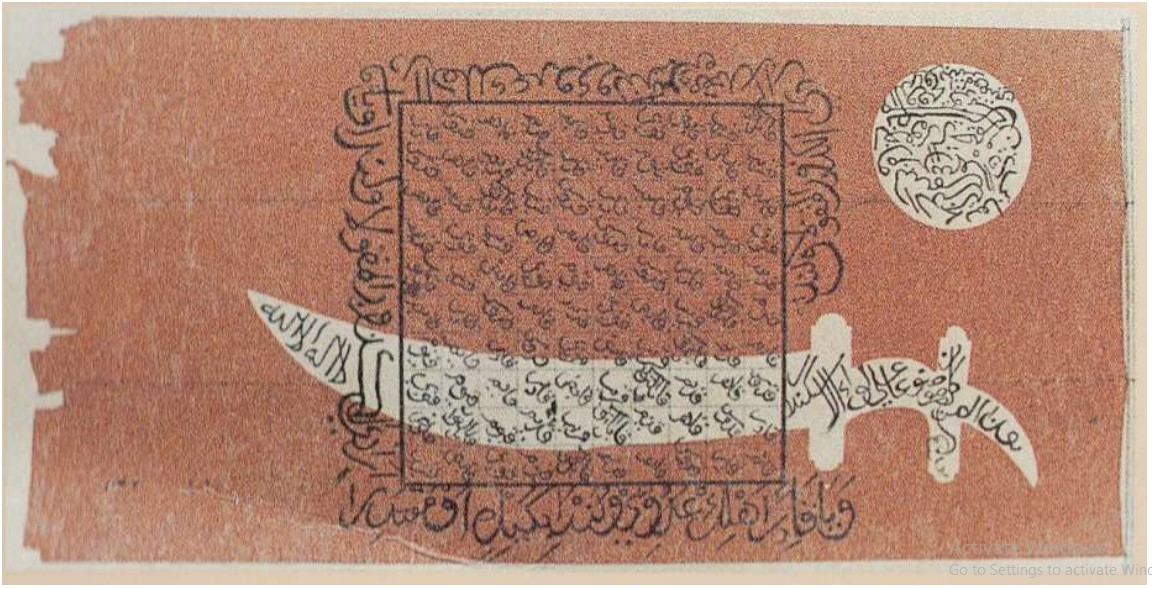
The flag used during the Aceh War

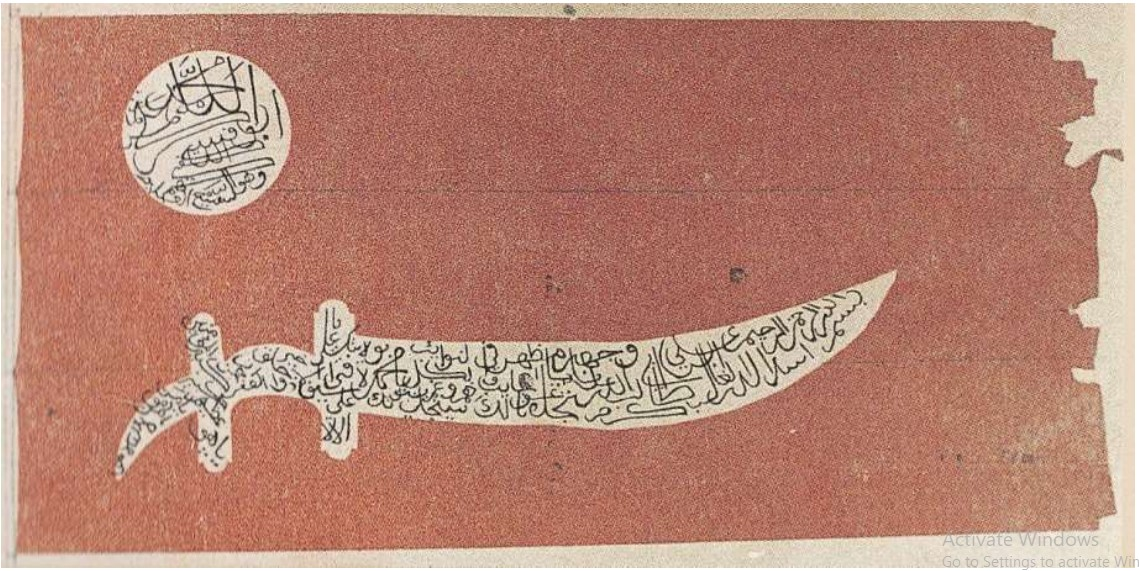
Aceh Mujahideen War Flag

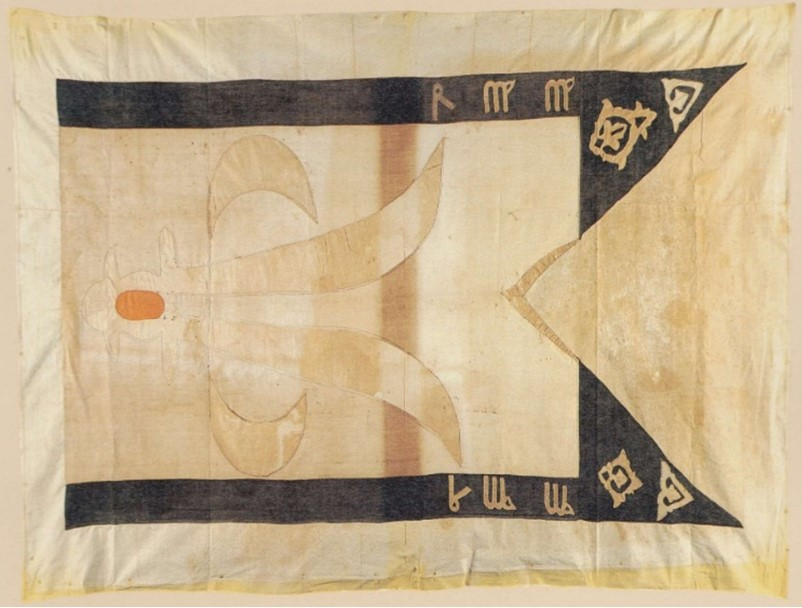
The battle flag of Acehnese fighters captured by the Dutch in the Battle of Jambo Ayer (1902). It is now kept at the Aceh Museum.

The Dutch, now hounded by locals and cholera alike, fortified their coastal positions and began a slow siege of the entire country, conducted by General van Pel. The capital, in particular, was surrounded by forts connected by railways. The Dutch made another serious attempt to finally pacify the country in 1884, but it quickly slowed and suffered from popular criticism. Dutch armies were finally able to make progress between 1898 and 1903, with each local potentate in occupied territories being forced to sign "The Short Declaration", a pledge of allegiance to the Dutch colonial overlords. Because of their co-operation, the Dutch were able to establish a fairly stable government in Aceh and get the sultan to surrender in 1903. After his exile in 1907, no successor was named, but the resistance continued to fight for some time, until 1912.

== Political administration ==
During the reign of Iskandar Muda (c.1583–1636), state centralization was carried out. This was done by removing or exterminating the present nobility and creating new ones that were friendly to the state. Besides this, the policy carried out the division of plots of land within the sultanate by mukim (similar to Christian parishes subdivisions), each of these mukims would be headed by an ulèebalang (leader) who was responsible for security. Some regions of Aceh, especially of the pepper-producing western regions, were controlled by appointed panglima (governors) whose duty was to report on events and were rotated every three years.

== Culture ==
=== Language ===
Aceh (Dutch: Atchin or Acheh; English: Achin; French: Achen or Acheh; Arabic: Asyi; Portuguese: Achen or Achem; Chinese: A-tsi or Ache), now known as the province of Aceh, is thought to have a substrate (underlying layer) from the Mon-Khmer language family with other linguistic regions such as the southern part using the Aneuk Jame language, whilst the central, south-eastern and eastern parts use the Gayo language; the south-eastern part uses the Alas language; and the eastern part, further east, uses the Tamiang language. Similarly, the Kluet ethnic group in the southern part uses the Kluet language, whilst in Simeulue the Simeulue language is used; however, each of these local languages can be further subdivided into dialects. The Acehnese language, for example, is spoken with slight variations in Aceh Besar, Pidie, and North Aceh. Similarly, within the Gayo language, there are Gayo Lut, Gayo Deret, and the Gayo Lues dialect, whilst the Singkil ethnic group in the south-east (Tanoh Alas) uses the Singkil language. Other historical sources include the Hikayat Aceh, the Hikayat Rajah Aceh and the Hikayat Prang Sabi, which are derived from narrative histories that were subsequently generally written in Jawi script. However, as is the weakness of narrative history based on oral tradition, according to Prof. Ibrahim Alfian, the manuscript of the Hikayat Prang Sabi (Aceh: Hikayat Perang Sabil) has many versions, and there are differences between them; the same applies to the 1710 version of the Hikayat Perang Sabil, which is held in the library of Leiden University in the Netherlands.

=== Literature ===
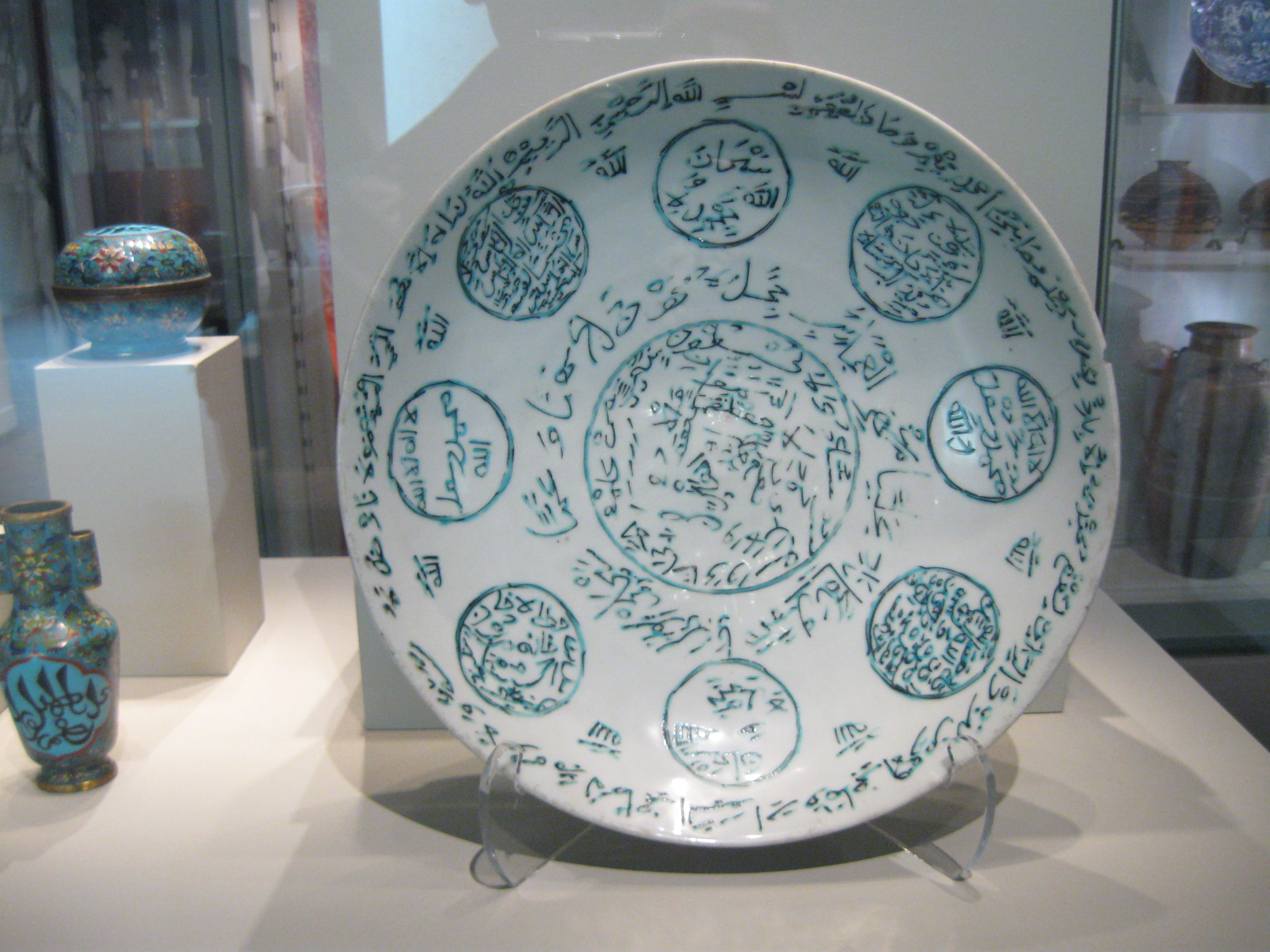
A ceramic plate made by Chinese Hui Muslims found in the Aceh Sultanate in the 17th century.

Aceh saw itself as heir to Pasai, the first Islamic kingdom in Southeast Asia, and succeeded the role of Islamic missionary work of Malacca after it was conquered by the Catholic Portuguese. It was called the "porch of Mecca", and became a center of Islamic scholarship, where the Qur'an and other Islamic texts were translated into Malay. Its notable scholars included Hamzah Fansuri, Syamsuddin of Pasai, Abdurrauf of Singkil, and the Indian Nuruddin ar-Raniri.

It is also through the Russian linguist, Vladimir Braginskiĭ, that the Hikayat Aceh from were influenced by Mughal dynasty historiography, as he found out the literal structure similarities of Hikayat Aceh with Mahfuzat-i-Timuri, as the former shared similar themes with the latter about the lifetime and exploits of the protagonist, Timur. Braginskiĭ also found similarities in structure of both the Hikayat Aceh and Mahfuzat-i-Timuri with Akbarnama manuscript.

== Economy ==
Aceh gained wealth from its export of pepper, nutmeg, cloves, betel nuts, and also tin once it conquered Pahang in 1617. Low-interest rates and the use of gold currency strengthened its economy. Aceh tended somehow to be fragile economically, however, because of the difficulty in providing enough surplus food to support the military and commercial adventures of the state. As Aceh lost political cohesion in the 17th century, it saw its trading importance yielded to the Dutch East India Company, who became the dominant military and economic power in the region following the successful siege of Malacca in 1641.

== Rulers ==
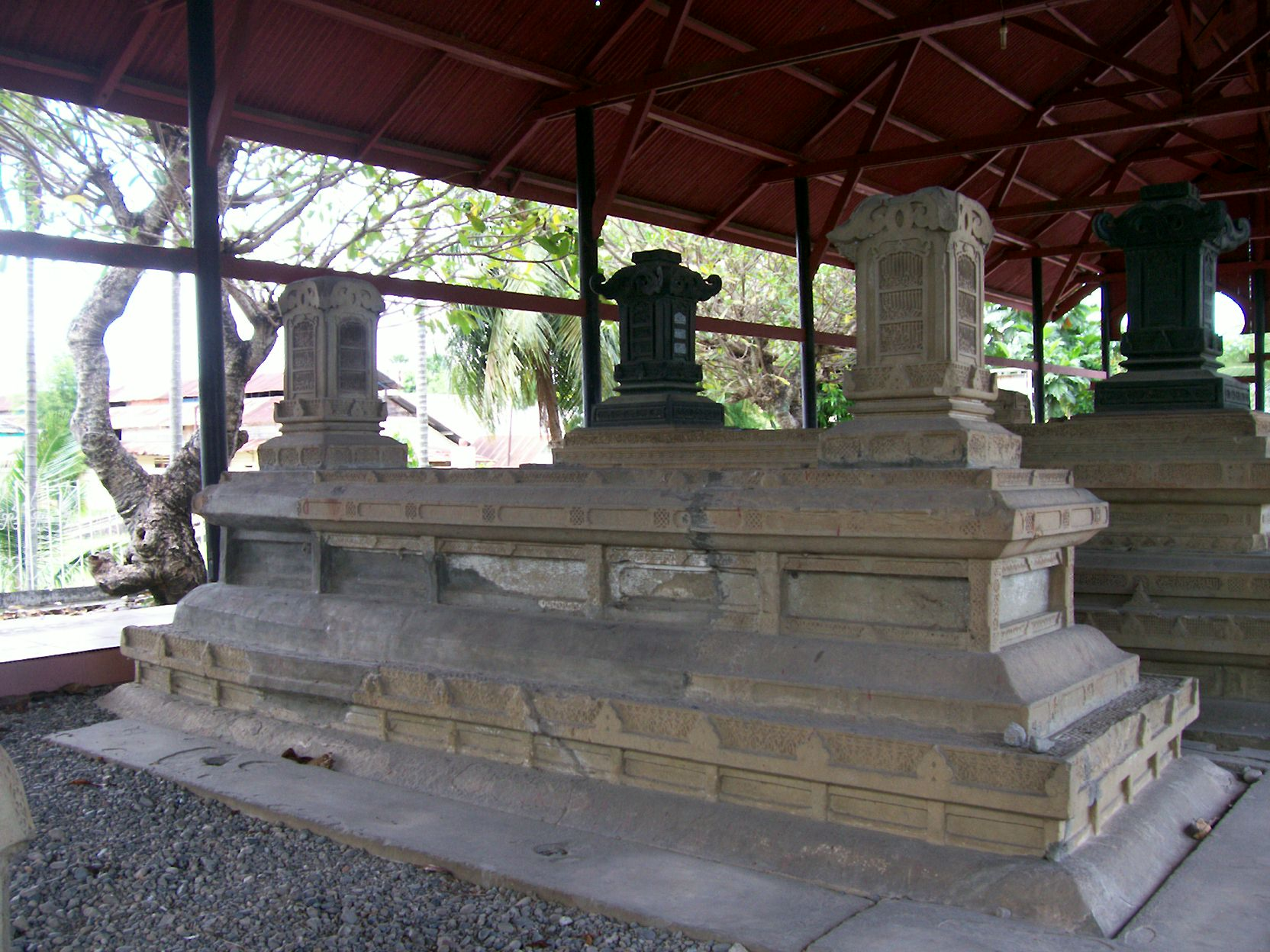
Sultan Ali Mughayat Syah's tomb in Banda Aceh

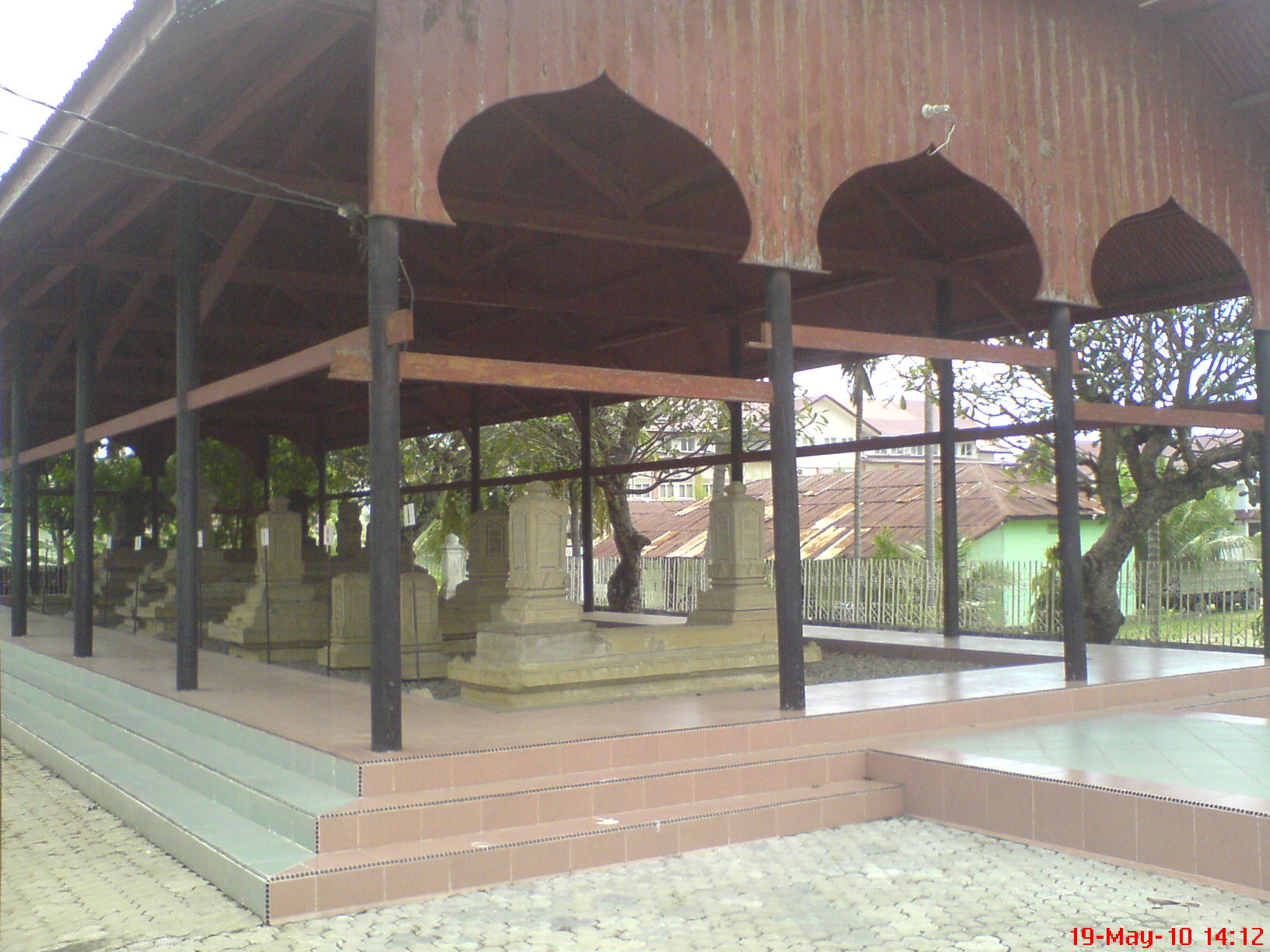
Sultan tomb complex from the period before Iskandar Muda in Banda Aceh

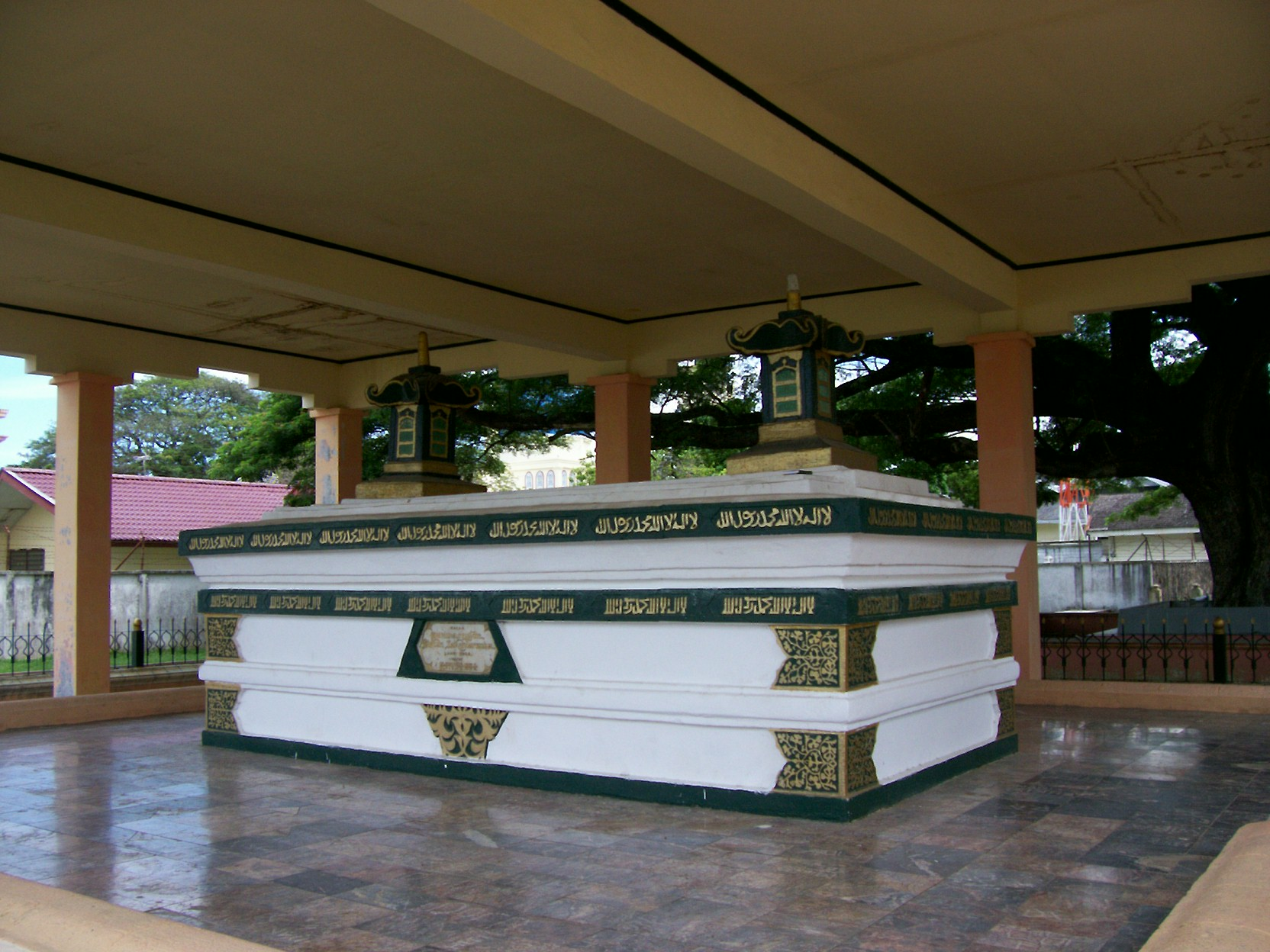
Sultan Iskandar Muda's tomb in Banda Aceh

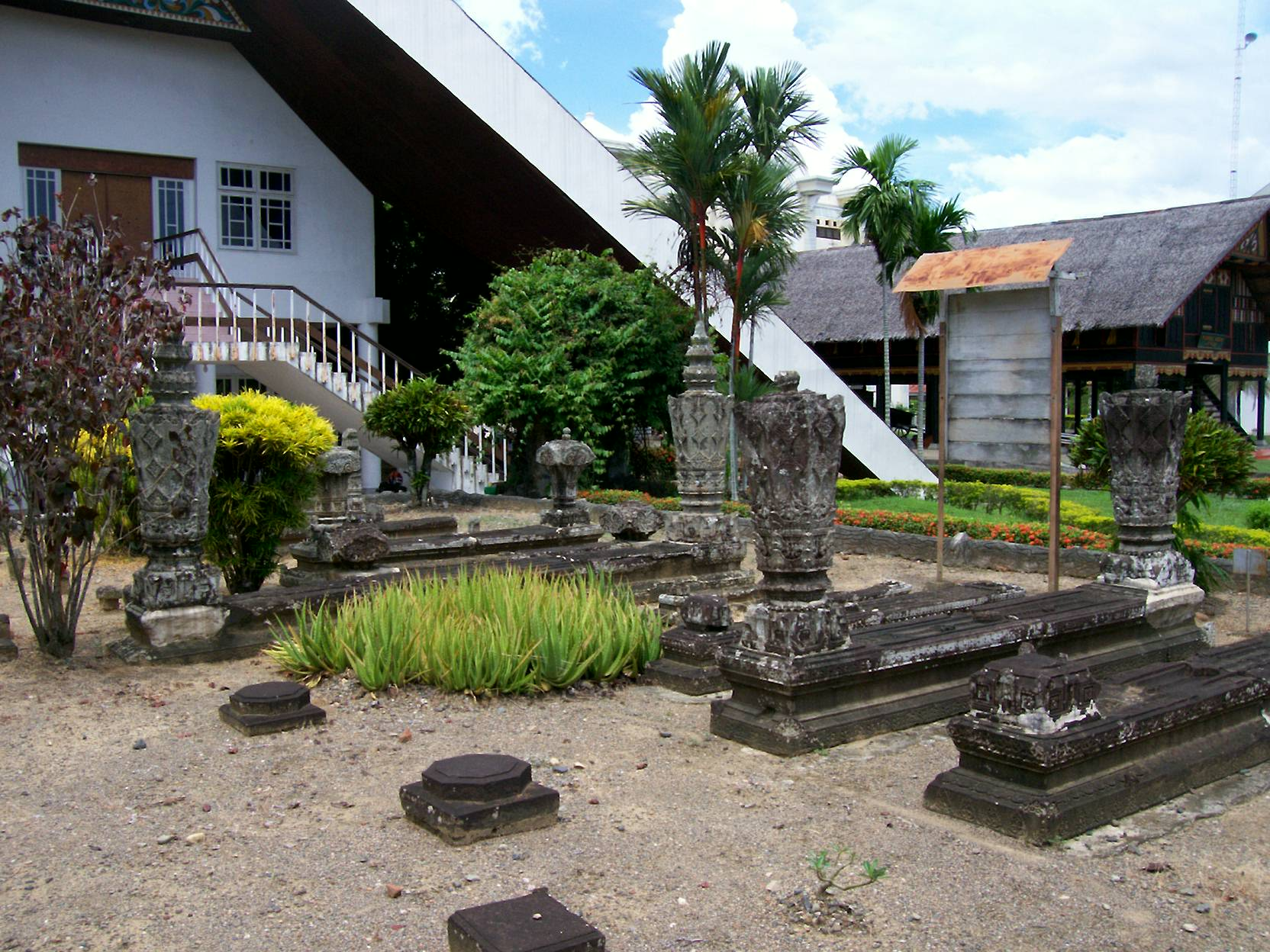
A tomb complex of Acehnese sultans descended from Bugis in Banda Aceh

Sultan of Aceh	Reign
Ali Mughayat Syah	c. 1514–1530
Salahuddin	1530–c. 1537/39
Alauddin al-Kahar	c. 1537/39–1571
Ali Ri'ayat Syah I	1571–1579
Sultan Muda	1579
Sri Alam	1579
Zainul Abidin	1579
Alauddin Mansur Syah	1579–1585/86
Ali Ri'ayat Syah II, Raja Buyung	1585/86–1589
Alauddin Ri'ayat Syah Sayyid al-Mukammal	1589–1604
Ali Ri'ayat Syah III	1604–1607
Iskandar Muda	1607–1636
Iskandar Thani	1636–1641
Ratu Safiatuddin Tajul Alam	1641–1675
Ratu Nurul Alam Naqiatuddin Syah	1675–1678
Ratu Inayat Zaqiatuddin Syah	1678–1688
Ratu Kamalat Syah	1688–1699
Badr ul-Alam Syarif Hasyim Jamaluddin	1699–1702
Perkasa Alam Syarif Lamtui Syah Johan Berdaulat	1702–1703
Jamal ul-Alam Badr ul-Munir	1703–1726
Jauhar ul-Alam	1726
Syamsul Alam	1726–1727
Alauddin Ahmad Syah	1727–1735
Alauddin Johan Syah	1735–1760
Alauddin Mahmud Syah I	1760–1781
Badr ul-Alam Syah	1764–1765
Sulaiman Syah	1773
Alauddin Muhammad Syah	1781–1795
Alauddin Jauhar ul-Alam Syah (first reign)	1795–1815
Syarif Saiful Alam Syah	1815–1819
Alauddin Jauhar ul-Alam Syah (second reign)	1819–1823
Alauddin Muhammad Da'ud Syah I	1823–1838
Alauddin Sulaiman Ali Iskandar Syah	1838–1857
Alauddin Ibrahim Mansur Syah	1857–1870
Alauddin Mahmud Syah II	1870–1874
Banda Aceh occupied by the Dutch from 1874
Alauddin Muhammad Da'ud Syah II Johan Berdaulat	1875–1903

== Family tree of Acehnese monarchs ==
Family tree of Acehnese Monarchs

Melaka dynasty
Mansur; Shah; Melaka r. 1459–1477
Alauddin; Riayat; Shah I Melaka r. 1477–1488	Muhammad; Shah; Pahang r. 1470–1475
Mahmud; Shah; Melaka r. 1488–1511
Meukuta Alam dynasty
Ali Mughayat; Syah^{(1)} r. 1514–1530	Muzaffar; Shah I Perak r. 1528–1549
Inderapura dynasty
Salahuddin^{(2)} r. 1530–1537/9	Alauddin; Riayat Syah; Al-Kahhar^{(3)} r. 1537/9–1571	Munawwar; Syah	Mansur; Shah I Perak r. 1549–1577	Mahmud; Shah I Pahang r. 1519–1530
Darul Kamal dynasty
Ali Riayat; Syah I^{(4)} r. 1571–1579	Sri Alam^{(6)} r. 1579–1579	♀ Raja Dewi	Ali Riayat; Syah II^{(9)} r. 1585–1589	Abdullah	Abdul Jalil	Alauddin; Riayat Syah; Sayyid; Al-Mukammal^{(10)} r. 1589–1605	Alauddin; Mansur Syah^{(8)} r. 1579–1585	Zainal Abidin; Shah; Pahang r. 1540–1555
Sultan Muda^{(5)} r. 1579–1579	Syekh; Muhyuddin; Fadlil Syah	Sulaiman	Zainul Abidin^{(7)} r. 1579–1579	Mansur Syah	♀ Putri Raja; Indrabangsa	Ali Riayat; Syah III^{(11)} r. 1604–1607	Abdul Kadir; Alauddin; Shah; Pahang r. 1560–1590
Jamalullail dynasty
Abdullah; Fadlil	Malik Mahmud; Qithul Kahhar; Syah	Malik; Radliat Syah	Ahmad Shah II; Pahang r. 1590–1592	Iskandar Muda^{(12)} r. 1607–1636	Syarif Ibrahim; Jamalullail
?
Syekh; Muhammad; Fadlil Syah	♀ Nurul Alam; Nakiatuddin; Syah^{(15)} r. 1675–1678	Sultan; Muhammad; Syah	Iskandar Thani; Alauddin; Mughayat Syah^{(13)} r. 1636–1641	♀ Tajul Alam; Safiatuddin; Syah^{(14)} r. 1641–1675	Badrul Alam; Syarif Hasyim; Jamaluddin^{(18)} r. 1699–1702	Perkasa Alam; Syarif Lamtui^{(19)} r. 1702–1703
?	?
♀ Zainatuddin; Kamalat Syah^{(17)} r. 1688–1699	♀ Inayat; Zakiatuddin; Syah^{(16)} r. 1678–1688	Jauharul Alam; Amauddin; Syah^{(21)} r. 1726–1726	Jamalul Alam; Badrul Munir^{(20)} r. 1703–1726	?
Royal Buginese Wajoq-Aceh Dynasty
Alauddin; Ahmad Syah^{(23)} r. 1727–1735	Syamsul Alam^{(22)} r. 1726–1727
Alauddin; Johan Syah^{(24)} r. 1735–1760
Siak dynasty
Alauddin; Mahmud Syah I^{(25)} r. 1760–1781	Badrul Alam; Syah^{(26)} r. 1764–1765
?
Alauddin; Muhammad; Syah^{(28)} r. 1781–1795	♀ Merah di Awan	Sulaiman; Syah^{(27)} r. 1773–1773	Tuanku Sayyid; Husain Aidid
Alauddin; Jauharul; Alam Syah^{(29)} r. 1795–1815, r. 1819 – 1823	Syarif Saiful; Alam Syah^{(30)} r. 1815–1819
Alauddin; Muhammad; Daud Syah I^{(31)} r. 1823–1838	Alauddin; Ibrahim; Mansur Syah^{(33)} r. 1857–1870
Alauddin; Sulaiman Ali; Iskandar Syah^{(32)} r. 1838–1857	Tuanku; Zainul Abidin
Alauddin; Mahmud Syah II^{(34)} r. 1870–1874	Alauddin; Muhammad; Daud Syah II^{(35)} r. 1875–1903

== See also ==
- Ottoman expedition to Aceh
