= Natal, North Sumatra =

Coordinates: 0°33′N 99°07′E

Natal is a town in Mandailing region, North Sumatra province, Indonesia. Batang Gadis National Park is located here. There is also a gold mining industry in the town. The name derives from ranah datar, "flat land" in Indonesian. Even though it is located in Mandailing region, culturally Natal people are part of Minangkabau people.
