= Jamal ul-Alam Badr ul-Munir =

Jamalul Alam Badrul Munir جمال العالم البدر المنير
- Sultan

Sultan of Aceh Sultanate
- Reign: 1703 – 1726
- Predecessor: Perkasa Alam Syarif Lamtui
- Successor: Jauhar ul-Alam
- Born: Banda Aceh, Aceh Sultanate
- Died: after 1736; Banda Aceh, Aceh Sultanate
- Dynasty: Jamal ul-Lail
- Father: Badr ul-Alam Syarif Hasyim Jamaluddin
- Religion: Islam

Jamal ul-Alam Badr ul-Munir (died after 1736) was the twentieth Sulṭān of Acèh Darussalam in northern Sumatra and the third ruler of the Arab Jamal ul-Lail Dynasty. He ruled from 1703 to 1726 when he was deposed.

== Taking the throne ==
The future sultan, originally called Alauddin, was the son of Sultan Badr ul-Alam Syarif Hasyim Jamaluddin who was deposed in 1702 and died shortly after. Alauddin arose as a dangerous rival to his uncle Perkasa Alam Syarif Lamtui who had taken the throne. Perkasa Alam was deposed in June 1703. After an interregnum of two months Alauddin was acknowledged as sultan under the name Jamal ul-Alam Badr al-Munir. The beginning of his reign was prosperous and the sultan stood out as a righteous ruler. A lot of rich merchants stayed in Aceh and the wealthiest was reportedly a Dutchman called Daniël. The sultan did not have the right to conduct trade, but could harvest 10% of the value of imported goods. He first stayed in fortress Dar ud Dunya in the capital Kutaraja, but in 1706 he moved the court to Melayu.

== Affairs with Europeans ==
According to the Dutch East India Company, which dominated part of the west coast of Sumatra, the sultan planned to regain Dutch possessions that had once belonged to Aceh. In 1712 he supposedly prepared an armada which would subjugate the coast land down to Padang. In the same year he vainly asked the sultan of Johor to assist him in attacking Dutch Melaka. Nothing came out of these plans; Aceh no longer possessed the military capacity of the days of Iskandar Muda. With improved security in the Acehnese homeland the sultan strove to expand commercial relations with the British who had posts in Madras in India and Bengkulu on Sumatra. At this time many Acehnese traders visited the coasts of India. In 1709 Jamal ul-Alam invited British merchants from Madras to come to Aceh. The suggestion was favourably received and many British ships appeared there in the next years. However, the British trade on Aceh declined from 1716 to 1730. One reason was that the Chinese had begun to avoid Aceh in favour of the more attractive Riau Archipelago south of the Malay Peninsula. With decreasing incomes from trade Jamal ul-Alam tried to tighten control over commerce and port duties all over Aceh. This would soon lead to serious internal turbulence.

== Loss of power ==
After a few years Batubara fell away from the sultan. Jamal ul-Alam sent troops to quell the uprising but failed. According to a story, the chiefs of Batubara feigned submission and sent poisoned young coconuts to the sultan who drank the juice without suspicion. He fell ill and immediately withdrew from the campaign, soon followed by his armada. The rebels now fortified Batubara against possible further attacks. One chronicle alleges that Jamal ul-Alam's popularity sank since he used African retainers who performed much mischief in Aceh.

Two years after the defection of Batubara the sultan visited the XXII Mukims, one of the three sagis (regions) in which Aceh was divided. The secret purpose was to imprison Muda Setia, the panglima (headman) of the sagi whom the sultan disliked. The plans leaked out, however; Muda Setia fled and collected substantial troops to withstand Jamal ul-Alam. A battle was fought which ended with the complete defeat of the sultan's troops. Jamal ul-Alam had to seek refuge in a fortress and discussed with his counselors what to do. One of them, Panglima Maharaja, advised him to leave for a safer part of Aceh and employ the loyal Buginese Maharaja Lela as commander in the fort until order had been restored. The sultan heeded the advice and fled to Pidie in November 1726.

== After abdication ==
After some chaos Panglima Maharaja took power as Jauhar ul-Alam but died almost immediately. After another short reign, Maharaja Lela was enthroned as Alauddin Ahmad Syah. He still had great respect for the deposed Jamal ul-Alam since he was a sayyid, a descendant of the Prophet. When Alauddin Ahmad Syah died in 1735, the ex-ruler Jamal ul-Alam was invited back to Kutaraja by the uleëbalangs (chiefs) to deliberate about a new sultan. The meeting ended in a rift; the XXII Mukims and XXV Mukims accepted Alauddin Ahmad Syah's eldest son Alauddin Johan Syah as sultan, while the XXVI Mukims preferred Jamal ul-Alam. The foremost champion of Alauddin Johan Syah was his youngest brother Pocut Muhammad. In spite of his brother's admonitions not to harm a descendant of the Prophet, Pocut Muhammad waged war on Jamal ul-Alam; this is the topic of the well-known Acehnese epic Hikayat Pocut Muhammad. After a defeat at Kampong Jawa, Jamal ul-Alam barely escaped by wearing women's cloths. He died some time later in Kampong Kandang and was buried there.

== Literature ==
- Coolhaas, W.P., ed. (1976) Generale missiven van Gouverneurs-Generaal en Raden aan Heren XVII der Verenigde Oostindische Compagnie, Deel VI: 1698-1713. 's-Gravenhage: M. Nijhoff.
- Djajadiningrat, Raden Hoesein (1911) 'Critische overzicht van de in Maleische werken vervatte gegevens over de geschiedenis van het soeltanaat van Atjeh', Bijdragen tot de Taal-, Land- en Volkenkunde 65, pp. 135–265.
- Drewes, G.W.J. (1979) Hikajat Potjut Muhamat: An Achehnese Epic. The Hague: M. Nijhoff.
- Lee Kam Hing (1995) The Sultanate of Aceh: Relations with the British, 1760-1824. Kuala Lumpur: Oxford University Press.
- Taniputera, Ivan (2013) Kerajaan-kerajaan Nusantara pascakeruntuhan Majapahit. Jakarta: Gloria Group.

Preceded by Perkasa Alam Syarif Lamtui	Sultan of Aceh Sultanate; 1703 – 1726	Succeeded by Jauhar ul-Alam
