= Singkil, Indonesia =

Town in Aceh, Indonesia

Coordinates: 2°17′N 97°47′E

Singkil
- District and Regency seat
- Interactive map of Singkil
- Country: Indonesia
- Province: Aceh
- Regency: Aceh Singkil
- Time zone: UTC+7 (WIB)

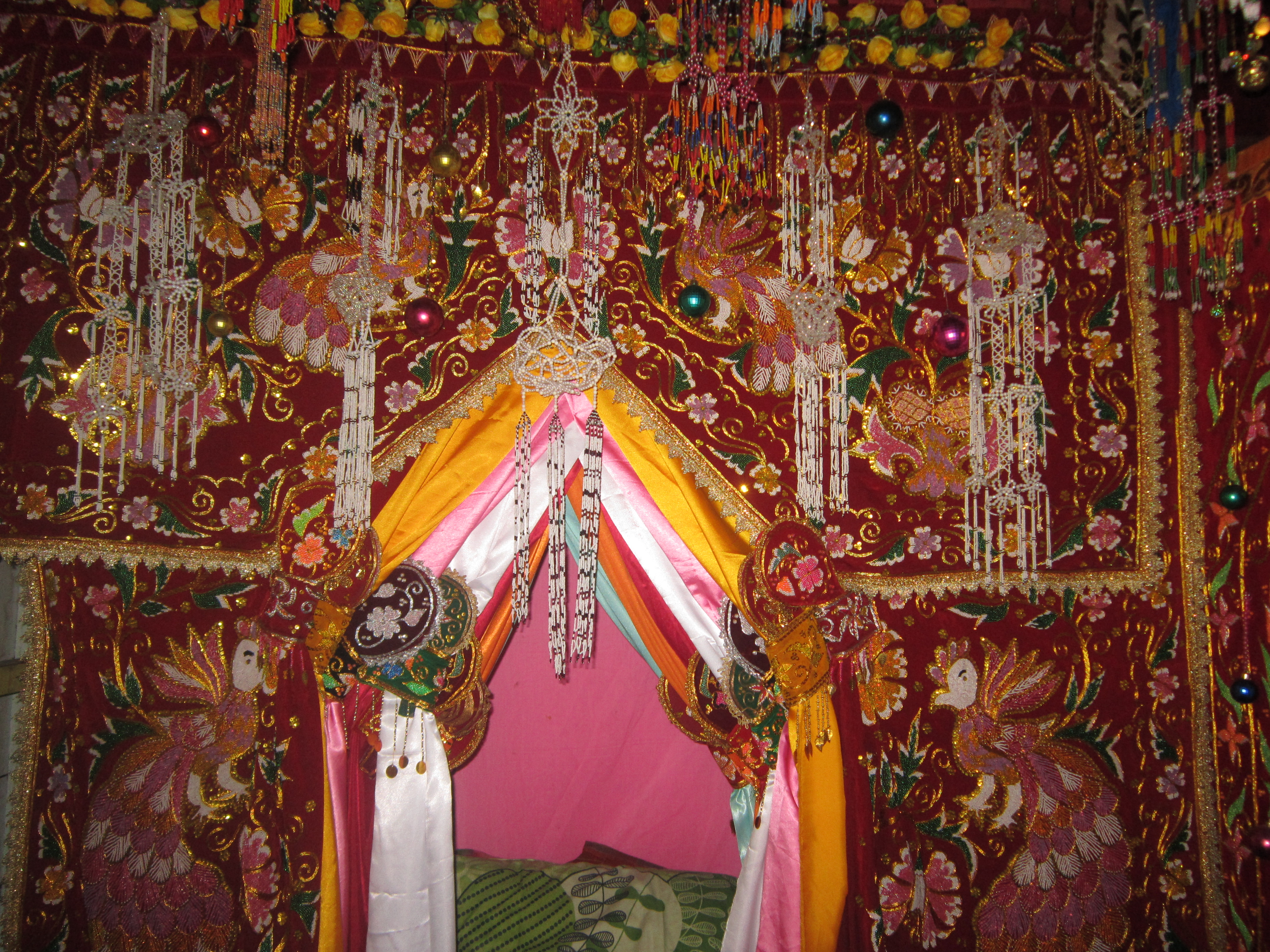
The Pekhatas, a traditional symbol of Singkil

Singkil is a town in Aceh province of Indonesia and the seat (capital) of Aceh Singkil Regency.

== Climate ==
Singkil has a tropical rainforest climate (Af) with heavy to very heavy rainfall year-round.

Climate data for Singkil
Month	Jan	Feb	Mar	Apr	May	Jun	Jul	Aug	Sep	Oct	Nov	Dec	Year
Mean daily maximum °C (°F)	31.4 (88.5)	31.9 (89.4)	32.2 (90.0)	32.3 (90.1)	32.4 (90.3)	32.3 (90.1)	32.1 (89.8)	31.9 (89.4)	31.3 (88.3)	31.0 (87.8)	30.8 (87.4)	30.8 (87.4)	31.7 (89.0)
Daily mean °C (°F)	26.5 (79.7)	26.7 (80.1)	27.1 (80.8)	27.3 (81.1)	27.4 (81.3)	27.1 (80.8)	26.9 (80.4)	26.8 (80.2)	26.6 (79.9)	26.6 (79.9)	26.4 (79.5)	26.3 (79.3)	26.8 (80.3)
Mean daily minimum °C (°F)	21.7 (71.1)	21.6 (70.9)	22.1 (71.8)	22.4 (72.3)	22.5 (72.5)	22.0 (71.6)	21.7 (71.1)	21.7 (71.1)	22.0 (71.6)	22.3 (72.1)	22.1 (71.8)	21.9 (71.4)	22.0 (71.6)
Average rainfall mm (inches)	276 (10.9)	248 (9.8)	331 (13.0)	408 (16.1)	330 (13.0)	246 (9.7)	265 (10.4)	354 (13.9)	366 (14.4)	465 (18.3)	449 (17.7)	352 (13.9)	4,090 (161.1)
Source: Climate-Data.org
