= List of state leaders in the 18th century =

This is a list of state leaders in the 18th century (1701–1800) AD, except for the leaders within the Holy Roman Empire, and the leaders within British South Asia and its predecessor states.

These polities are generally sovereign states, but excludes minor dependent territories, whose leaders can be found listed under territorial governors in the 18th century. For completeness, these lists can include colonies, protectorates, or other dependent territories that have since gained sovereignty.

== Africa ==
=== Central ===
Angola

- Kasanje Kingdom (complete list) –
  - Kiluanje kya Ngonga, King (c.1690s–1700s)
  - Kinguri kya Kasombe, King (c.1700s)
  - Kitumba kya Kalunga, King (c.1710s)
  - Kambamba ka Kinguri, King (c.1720s)
  - Kasanje ka Kiluanje, King (c.1730s)
  - Lubame lwa Kipungo, King (c.1739–1750s)
  - Ngunza a Kambamba, King (c.1750–1770)
  - Lukala lwa Njinje, King (early 1770s)
  - Kalunga ka Luhame, King (mid 1770s)
  - Kitumba kya Wanga, King (late 1770s–early 1780s)
  - Kisweya kya Kambamba, King (1780s)
  - Kitamba kya Shiba, King (c.1785–1792)
  - Malenge a Ngonga, King (1792–c.1810)
- Kingdom of Kongo (complete list) –
  - João II of Lemba, Awenekongo, Lemba claimant (1680–1716)
  - Manuel of Lovata, Awenekongo, Mbamba Lovata claimant (1678–1715)
  - Pedro IV, Awenekongo, Kibangu claimant (1695–1709), Manikongo (1709–1718)
  - Manuel II, Manikongo (1718–1743)
  - Garcia IV, Manikongo (1743–1752)
  - Manuel II, Manikongo (1752–post-1758)
  - Nicolau I, Manikongo (mid-18th century)
  - Afonso IV, Manikongo (mid-18th century)
  - António II, Manikongo (mid-18th century)
  - Sebastião I, Manikongo (?–1763)
  - Pedro V, Manikongo (1763–1764)
  - Álvaro XI, Manikongo (1764–1778)
  - José I, Manikongo (1778–1785)
  - Afonso V, Manikongo (1785–1787)
  - Álvaro XII, Manikongo (1787–?)
  - Alexio I, Manikongo (?–1793)
  - Joaquim I, Manikongo (1793–1794)
  - Henrique II, Manikongo (1794–1803)
- Kingdom of Matamba (complete list) –
  - Verónica I, Queen (1681–1721)
  - Afonso I, King (1721–1741)
  - Ana II, Queen (1741–1756)
  - Verónica II, Queen (1756–1758)
  - Ana III, Queen (1758–?)
  - Francisco II, King (late 18th century)
- Portuguese Angola (complete list) –

Colony, 1575–1951
For details see the Kingdom of Portugal under Southwest Europe

Cameroon

- Fondom of Bafut (complete list) –
  - Chunga, King (1677–1708)
  - Ngwa Abi-Fu, King (1708–1752)
  - Tumfong, King (1752–1799)
  - Achirimbi I, King (1799–1852)
- Kingdom of Bamum (complete list) –
  - Koutou, Mfon (1672–1757)
  - Mbouombouo, Mfon (1757–1814)
- Duala people (complete list) –
  - Mapoka a Ngie, ruler (17th–18th century)
  - Kuo a Mapoka, ruler (18th century)
  - George, Senior chief, King (fl.1788–90)
  - Priso a Doo, Chief (late 18th century)
  - Kwane a Ngie, Chief (late 18th century)
  - Kwa a Kuo, ruler (18th–early 19th century)

Central African Republic

Chad

- Sultanate of Bagirmi (complete list) –
  - ‘Abdul Qadir I, Mbangi (1680–1707)
  - Bar, Mbangi (1707–1722)
  - Wanja, Mbangi (1722–1736)
  - Burkomanda II Tad Lele, Mbangi (1736–1741)
  - Loel, Mbangi (1741–1751)
  - Hajji Mohammed al'Amin, Mbangi (1751–1785)
  - ‘Abd ar-Rahman Gawrang, Mbangi (1785–1806)
- Wadai Empire (complete list) –
  - Muhammad Salih Derret ibn Jawda, Kolak (1795–1803)

Congo, Democratic Republic of the

- Kuba Kingdom (complete list) –
  - KotomBoke, Nyim (17th or 18th century)
  - Golo Shanga, Nyim (18th century)
  - Misha Mishanga Shanga, Nyim (18th century)
  - Bokare Che, Nyim (18th century)
  - Bushabun Che, Nyim (18th century)
  - Koto Che, Nyim (18th century)
  - Misha Pelenge Che, Nyim (18th century)
  - Bope Pelenge, Nyim (18th century)
  - Kata Mbula, Nyim (1776–1810)
- Kingdom of Luba (complete list) –
  - Nkongolo Mwamba, muLopwe (?–1780)
  - Ilunga Sungu, muLopwe (1780–1809)
- Lunda Empire (complete list) –
  - Mbala I Yaav, Mwaant Yaav (c.1690–c.1720)
  - Mukaz Munying Kabalond, Mwaant Yaav (c.1720)
  - Muteba I Kat Kateng, Mwaant Yaav (c.1720–c.1750)
  - Mukaz Waranankong, Mwaant Yaav (c.1750–c.1767)
  - Nawej Mufa Muchimbunj, Mwaant Yaav (c.1767–c.1775)
  - Cikombe Yaava, Mwaant Yaav (c.1775–c.1800)

Congo, Republic of the

- Kingdom of Loango (complete list) –
  - N'Gangue M'voumbe Nombo, King (?–1766)
  - N'Gangue M'voumbe Makosso, King (1773–1787)

Equatorial Guinea

- Spanish Guinea (complete list) –

Colony, 1778–1968
For details see Spain in southwest Europe

Gabon

- Kingdom of Orungu (complete list) –
  - Reto Ndongo, Founder (c.1700–?)
  - Ndébulia Mburu, Agamwinboni (c.1730–?)
  - Rénjangué Ndongo, Agamwinboni (?–1750)
  - Rénkondjé, Agamwinboni (c.1750)
  - Ngwèrangu'Iwono, Agamwinboni (c.1750–1790)
  - Ndombe, Agamwinboni (1790)
  - Rénwombi "Mpolo", Agamwinboni (1790–1810)

São Tomé and Príncipe

- Portuguese São Tomé and Príncipe (complete list) –

Colony, 1470–1951
For details see the Kingdom of Portugal under Southwest Europe

=== East ===
Great Lakes area

Burundi

- Kingdom of Burundi (complete list) –
  - Ntare I, King (c.1680–c.1709)
  - Mwezi III, King (c.1709–c.1739)
  - Mutaga III, King (c.1739–c.1767)
  - Mwambutsa I, King (c.1767–c.1796)
  - Ntare IV, King (c.1796–c.1850)

Kenya

- Sultanate of Mombasa (complete list) –
  - ‘Ali ibn Uthman al-Mazru‘i, Sultan (1746–1755)
  - Masud ibn Naisr al-Mazru‘i, Sultan (1755–1773)
  - Abdallah ibn Muhammad al-Mazru‘i, Sultan (1773–1782)
  - Ahmad ibn Muhammad al-Mazru‘i, Sultan (1782–1811)
- Pate Sultanate: Nabahani dynasty (complete list) –
  - Bwana Mkuu, Mfalume (1688–1713)
  - Bwana Tamu, Mfalume (1713–?)
  - Fumo Madi ibn Abi Bakr, Mfalume (1779–1809)

Rwanda

- Kingdom of Rwanda (complete list) –
  - Cyilima II Rujugira, King (1675–1708)
  - Kigeli III Ndabarasa, King (1708–1741)
  - Mibambwe III Mutabazi II Sentabyo, King (1741–1746)
  - Yuhi IV Gahindiro, King (1746–1802)

South Sudan

- Shilluk Kingdom –
  - Tugø, Rädh (c.1690–1710)
  - Nyokwejø, Rädh (c.1780–1820)

Tanzania

Uganda

- Ankole (complete list) –
  - Macwa, Omugabe (c.1727–c.1755)
  - Rwabirere, Omugabe (c.1755–1783)
  - Kahaya I, Omugabe (1783–?)
- Buganda (complete list) –
  - Kayemba, Kabaka (c.1690–c.1704)
  - Tebandeke, Kabaka (c.1704–c.1724)
  - Ndawula, Kabaka (c.1724–c.1734)
  - Kagulu, Kabaka (c.1734–c.1736)
  - Kikulwe, Kabaka (c.1736–c.1738)
  - Mawanda. (c.1738–c.1740)
  - Mwanga I, Kabaka (c.1740–c.1741)
  - Namuggala, Kabaka (c.1741–c.1750)
  - Kyabaggu, Kabaka (c.1750–c.1780)
  - Jjunju, Kabaka (c.1780–c.1797)
  - Semakookiro, Kabaka (c.1797–c.1814)
- Bunyoro (complete list) –
  - Kyebambe II, Omukama
  - Olimi III, Omukama (c.1710–1731)
  - Duhaga, Omukama (1731–c.1782)
  - Olimi IV, Omukama (c.1782–1786)
  - Nyamutukura Kyebambe III, Omukama (1786–1835)

Horn of Africa area

Djibouti

Eritrea

Ethiopia

- Ethiopian Empire (complete list) –

Solomonic dynasty

  - Iyasu I, Emperor (1682–1706)
  - Tekle Haymanot I, Emperor (1706–1708)
  - Tewoflos, Emperor (1708–1711)
  - Yostos, Emperor (1711–1716)
  - Dawit III, Emperor (1716–1721)
  - Bakaffa, Emperor (1721–1730)
  - Iyasu II, Emperor (1730–1755)
  - Iyoas I, Emperor (1755–1769)

Zemene Mesafint

  - Yohannes II, Emperor (1769)
  - Tekle Haymanot II, Emperor (1769–1770)
  - Susenyos II, Emperor (1770)
  - Tekle Haymanot II, Emperor (1770–1777)
  - Salomon II, Emperor (1777–1779)
  - Tekle Giyorgis I, Emperor (1779–1784)
  - Iyasu III, Emperor (1784–1788)
  - Tekle Giyorgis I, Emperor (1788–1789)
  - Hezqeyas, Emperor (1789–1794)
  - Tekle Giyorgis I, Emperor (1794–1795)
  - Baeda Maryam II, Emperor (1795)
  - Tekle Giyorgis I, Emperor (1795–1796)
  - Salomon III, Emperor (1796–1797)
  - Yonas, Emperor (1797–1798)
  - Tekle Giyorgis I, Emperor (1798–1799)
  - Salomon III, Emperor (1799)
  - Demetros, Emperor (1799–1800)
  - Tekle Giyorgis I, Emperor (1800)
  - Demetros, Emperor (1800–1801)
- Sultanate of Aussa (complete list) –
  - Kadhafo, Sultan (1734–1749)
  - Kadhafo Mahammad ibn Kadhafo, Sultan (1749–1779)
  - Aydahis ibn Kadhafo Mahammad, Sultan (1779–1801)
- Kingdom of Garo (complete list) –
  - Leliso, Tato (1690–1720)
  - Wako, Tato (1720–1740)
  - Malko, Tato (1740–1760)
  - Gabito, Tato (1760–1780)
  - Chaso, usurper Tato, (1780–1790)
  - Dukamo, Tato (1790–1845)
- Kingdom of Gomma (complete list) –
  - Mijyu, Moti (?–c.1820)
  - Abba Manno, Moti (c.1820–c.1840)
- Kingdom of Gumma (complete list) –
  - Adam, Moti, Founder (late 18th century)
  - Oncho, Moti (c.1795)
- Emirate of Harar (complete list) –
  - Ṭalḥa ibn ʿAbdullah, Emīr (1700–1721)
  - Abūbakar ibn ʿAbdullah, Emīr (1721–1732)
  - Khalaf ibn Abūbakar, Emīr (1732–1733)
  - Ḥāmid ibn Abūbakar, Emīr (1733–1747)
  - Yūsuf ibn Abūbakar, Emīr (1747–1755)
  - Aḥmed ibn Abūbakar, Emīr (1755–1782)
  - Maḥamed ibn Yūsuf, Emīr (1782–1783)
  - `Abd al-Shakur ibn Yusuf, Emīr (1783–1794)
  - Ahmad II ibn Muhammad, Emīr (1794–1821)
- Kingdom of Jimma (complete list) –
  - Abba Faro, Moti (late 18th century)
  - Abba Magal, Moti (c.1800)
- Kingdom of Kaffa (complete list) –
  - Gali Ginocho or Tan Ginok, King (1675–1710)
  - Gaki Gaocho or Otti Sheroch, King (1710–1742)
  - Gali Gaocho or Kanechoch, King (1742–1775)
  - Shagi Sherocho or Gali Keffoch, King (1775–1795)
  - Beshi Ginocho or Kaye Sheroch, King (1795–1798)
  - Hoti Gaocho or Beshi Sheroch, King (1798–1821)
- Ennarea (complete list) –
  - Shisafocho, Hinnare-tato (early 18th century)
  - Sacho Nechocho, Hinnare-tato (c.1750)
  - Tekle Sachi, Hinnare-tato (late 18th century)
- Kingdom of Welayta: Tigre dynasty (complete list) –
  - Kote, Kawa (18th century)
  - Libana, Kawa (18th century)
  - Tube, Kawo (?–1761)
  - Ogatto, Kawa (1761–1800)
  - Amado, Kawa (1800–1835)

Somalia (including Somaliland)

- Sultanate of the Geledi (complete list) –
  - Ibrahim Adeer, Sultan (late 17th century–mid 18th century)
  - Mahamud Ibrahim, Sultan (mid-18th century–1828)
- Isaaq Sultanate (complete list) –
  - Guled Abdi, Sultan (~1750s-1808)

Indian Ocean

Comoros

- Sultanate of Ndzuwani (complete list) –
  - Alimah III, Sultan/female ruler (c.1676–c.1711)
  - Salim of Johanna, Sultan (c.1711–c.1741)
  - Saidi Ahamd, Sultan (c.1741–c.1782)
  - Abdallah I (Alimiah), de facto ruler (c.1782–c.1788)
  - Halimah IV, Sultan (c.1788–c.1792)
  - Abdallah I (Alimiah), de facto ruler (c.1792–c.1796)
  - Alawi bin Husain, Sultan (1796–1816)
- Sultanate of Mayotte (complete list) –
  - Ali II, Sultan (c.1680–c.1700)
  - Aisa, Queen Regent (c.1700–c.1714)
  - Monavo Fani, Queen Regent (c.1714–c.1720)
  - Abu Bakr, Sultan (c.1720–1727)
  - Salim I, Sultan (1727–1752)
  - Bwana Kombo I, Sultan (1752–1790)
  - Salim II, Sultan (1790–1807)

Madagascar

- Boina Kingdom (complete list) –
  - Andriamandisoarivo (Tsimanata), King (c.1690–1720)
  - Andrianamboniarivo (Toakafa), King (c.1720–1730)
  - Andriamahatindriarivo, King (c.1730–1760)
  - Andrianahilitsy, King (c.1760–1767)
  - Andrianiveniarivo, King (1767–1770)
  - Andrianihoatra, King (1770–1771)
  - Andrianikeniarivo, King (1771–1777)
  - Andrianaginarivo, Queen (1777–1778)
  - Tombola, Queen (1778)
  - Ravahiny, Queen (c.1778–1808)
- Merina Kingdom (complete list) –
  - Andriamasinavalona, King (1675–1710)
  - Andriantsimitoviaminiandriana Andriandrazaka, King (1710–1730)
  - Andriambelomasina, King (1730–1770)
  - Andrianjafynandriamanitra, King (1770–1787)
  - Andrianampoinimerina, King (1787–1810)

Mauritius

- Isle de France (complete list) –

French colony, 1715–1810
For details see France under western Europe

Seychelles

=== Northcentral ===
Libya

- Karamanli dynasty of Ottoman Tripolitania (complete list) –
  - Ahmed I, Pasha (1711–1745)
  - Mehmed, Pasha (1745–1754)
  - Ali I, Pasha (1754–1793)
  - Ali Burghul, Pasha (1793–1795)
  - Ahmed II, Pasha (1795)
  - Yusuf Karamanli, Pasha (1795–1832)

Tunisia

- Eyalet of Tunis –
  - Ibrahim Sharif, Bey (1702–1705)
- Beylik of Tunis (complete list) –
  - Al-Husayn I ibn Ali, Bey (1705–1735)
  - Abu l-Hasan Ali I, Bey (1735–1756)
  - Muhammad I ar-Rashid, Bey (1756–1759)
  - Ali II ibn Hussein, Bey (1759–1782)
  - Hammuda ibn Ali, Bey (1782–1814)

=== Northeast ===
Egypt

Sudan

- Sultanate of Darfur (complete list) –
  - Ahmad Bukr, Sultan (early 18th century–c.1730)
  - Muhammad Dawra, Sultan (c.1730–?)
  - Umar Lel, Sultan (?–c.1752/3)
  - Abu'l Qasim, Sultan (c.1752/3–?)
  - Muhammad Tayrab, Sultan (?–1785/6)
  - Abd al-Rahman, Sultan (1785/6–c.1801)
- Funj Sultanate (complete list) –
  - Badi III, Sultan (1692–1716)
  - Unsa III, Sultan (1719–1720)
  - Nul, Sultan (1720–1724)
  - Badi IV, Sultan (1724–1762)
- Hamaj Regency of the Funj Sultanate
  - Sultans (complete list) –
    - Nasir, Sultan (1762–1769)
    - Isma'il, Sultan (1768–1776)
    - Adlan II, Sultan (1776–1789)
    - Awkal, Sultan (1787–1788)
    - Tayyib II, Sultan (1788–1790)
    - Badi V, Sultan (1790)
    - Nawwar, Sultan (1790–1791)
    - Badi VI, Sultan (1791–1798)
    - Ranfi, Sultan (1798–1804)
  - Regents (complete list) –
    - Muhammad Abu Likayik, Regent (1762/69–1775/6)
    - Badi walad Rajab, Regent (1775/6–1780)
    - Rajab, Regent (1780–1786/7)
    - Nasir, Regent (1786/7–1798)
    - Idris wad Abu Likayik, Regent (1798–1804)
- Taqali (complete list) –
  - Muhammad wad Jayli, Mukūk (c.1750)
  - Umar I–1783, Mukūk (?–1783)
  - Ismail I, Mukūk (1783–1800)
  - Abakr I, Mukūk (1800–1820)

=== Northwest ===
Algeria

- Regency of Algiers (Sultans / Governors) –

Vassal state, 1671–1830

  - Hadji Mustapha, Dey (1700–1710)
  - Deli Ibrahim, Dey (1710)
  - Ali Chauch, Dey (1710–1718), Pasha, (1718)
  - Muhammad III ben Hassan, Pasha-Dey (1718–1724)
  - Abdy Pasha, Pasha-Dey (1724–1732)
  - Ibrahim ben Ramdan, Pasha-Dey (1732–1745)
  - Kutchuk Ibrahim, Pasha-Dey (1745–1748)
  - Muhammed IV, Pasha-Dey (1748–1754)
  - Baba Ali II, Pasha-Dey (1754–1766)
  - Muhammad V ben Othman, Pasha-Dey (1766–1791)
  - Baba Hassan, Pasha-Dey (1791–1799)

Morocco

- Morocco: Alaouite dynasty (complete list) –
  - Ismail Ibn Sharif, Sultan (1672–1727)
  - Abu'l Abbas Ahmad, Sultan (1727–1728, 1728–1729)
  - Abdalmalik, Sultan (1728)
  - Ali, Sultan (1734–1736)
  - Mohammed II, Sultan (1736–1738)
  - Zin al-Abidin, Sultan (1741)
  - Al-Mostadi, Sultan (1738–1740, 1742–1743, 1747–1748)
  - Abdallah, Sultan (1729–1734, 1736–1736, 1740–1741, 1741–1742, 1743–1747, 1748–1757)
  - Mohammed III, Sultan (1757–1790)
  - Yazid, Sultan (1790–1792)
  - Slimane, Sultan (1792–1822)

=== South ===
Botswana

Eswatini/ Swaziland

- Kingdom of Eswatini (Swaziland)
  - Kings (complete list) –
    - Ngwane III, King (1745–1780)
    - Ndvungunye, King (1780–1815)
  - tiNdlovukati (complete list) –
    - LaYaka Ndwandwe, Ndlovukati (1745–1780), Queen Regent (1780)
    - Lomvula Mndzebele, Ndlovukati (1780–1815), Queen Regent (1815)

Lesotho

Malawi

Mozambique

- Portuguese Mozambique (complete list) –

Colony, 1498–1972
For details see the Kingdom of Portugal under Southwest Europe

Namibia

- Gciriku (complete list) –
  - Shimwemwe, ruler (1785–1805)

South Africa

- Zulu Kingdom (complete list) –

(1700s–1897)

  - Senzangakhona kaJama, King (1781–1816)
- Dutch Cape Colony (complete list) –

British occupation, 1795–1803

- Cape Colony (complete list) –

British colony, 1795–1910
For details see the United Kingdom under British Isles, Europe

Zambia

- Kazembe –
  - Lukwesa Ilunga, Mwata (1760–1805)

Zimbabwe

- Kingdom of Mutapa (complete list) –
  - Nyamaende Mhande, Mwenemutapa (1694–1707)
  - Nyenyedzi Zenda, Mwenemutapa (1707–1711)
  - Baroma Mugwagwa, Mwenemutapa (1711–1712)

returns to Rozwi vassalage (1712)

  - Samatambira Nyamhandu I, Mwenemutapa (1712–1723)

independent of Rozwi (1720)

  - Samatambira Nyamhandu I, Mwenemutapa (1723–1735)
  - Nyatsusu, Mwenemutapa (1735–1740)
  - Dehwe Mapunzagutu, Mwenemutapa (1740–1759)
- Rozvi Empire (complete list) –
  - Changamire Negamo, King (c.1700–1710)
  - Chirisamuru, King (c.1712–1788)
  - Changamire Dhafa, King (c.1790–1824)

=== West ===
Benin

- Kingdom of Benin (complete list) –
  - Ore-Oghene, Oba (1689–1701)
  - Ewuakpe, Oba (1701–1712)
  - Ozuere, Oba (1712–1713)
  - Akenzua I, Oba (1713–1740)
  - Eresoyen, Oba (1740–1750)
  - Akengbuda, Oba (1750–1804)
- Dahomey (complete list) –
  - Akaba, King (1685–1716)
  - Hangbe, Queen (1716–1718)
  - Agaja, King (1718–1740)

Vassal of the Oyo Empire, 1740–1823

  - Tegbessou, King (1740–1774)
  - Kpengla, King (1774–1789)
  - Agonglo, King (1789–1797)
  - Adandozan, King (1797–1818)
- Hogbonu (complete list) –
  - Té-Agbanlin, Ahosu (1688–1729)
  - Hiakpon, Ahosu (1729–1739)
  - Lokpon, Ahosu (1739–1746)
  - Hude, Queen (1746–1752)
  - Messe, Ahosu (1752–1757)
  - Huyi, Ahosu (1757–1761)
  - Gbeyon, Ahosu (1761–1765)
  - Ayikpe, Ahosu (1775–1783)
  - Ayaton, Ahosu (1783–1794)
  - Huffon, Ahosu (1794–1807)
- Ketu (Benin) (complete list) –
  - Ajibolu, Oba (1795–1816)

Burkina Faso

- Kingdom of Koala (complete list) –
  - Balibagini, King (c.1718–c.1722)
  - Baadindiye, King (?)
  - Alfa, (Note: Delmond offers 1734–1748 for Koro's reign and 1748–1763 for that of Alfa. More recent historians reverse the order of their rule; it is not clear whether the given regnal dates are accurate.) King (?)
  - Koro, King (?)
  - Paamba, King (c.1763–c.1781)
  - Yembrima, King (?)
  - Baalisongi, King (?)
- Mossi Kingdom of Gwiriko (complete list) –
  - Famaghan Wattara, ruler (1714–1729)
  - Famaghan dan Tyeba, ruler (1729–1742)
  - Kere Massa Wattara, ruler (1742–1749)
  - Magan Wule Wattara, ruler (1749–1809)
- Mossi Kingdom of Liptako (complete list) –
  - Brahima bi Saydu, Ja-oro (1758–1810)
- Mossi Kingdom of Nungu (complete list) –
  - Lissoangui, Nunbado (1684–1709)
  - Yendabri, Nunbado (1709–c.1736)
  - Yembrima, Nunbado (1736–1791)
  - Baahamma, Nunbado (1791–1822)
- Mossi Kingdom of Wogodogo (complete list) –
  - Naaba Dulugu, Moogo-naaba (1783–1802)
- Mossi Kingdom of Yatenga (complete list) –
  - Naaba Yadega, Yatenga naaba (c.18th century)
  - Naaba Yolomfaogoma, Yatenga naaba (c.18th century)
  - Naaba Kourita, Yatenga naaba (18th century)
  - Naaba Geda, Yatenga naaba (18th century)
  - Naaba Wobgho I, Yatenga naaba (18th century)
  - Naaba Kango, Yatenga naaba (1754–1787)
  - Rima Naaba Saaga, Yatenga naaba (1787–1803)

Cape Verde

- Portuguese Cape Verde (complete list) –

Colony, 1462–1951
For details see the Kingdom of Portugal under Southwest Europe

Gambia

Ghana

- Kingdom of Ashanti (complete list) –
  - Osei Kofi Tutu I, Asantehene (c.1675/80–1717)
  - Amaniampon, Regent (1717–1720)
  - Opoku Ware I, Asantehene (1720–1750)
  - Kusi Oboadum, Asantehene (1750–1764)
  - Safo Kantanka, Regent (1764)
  - Osei Kwadwo Okoawia, Asantehene (1764–1777)
  - Atakora Kwame, Regent (1777)
  - Osei Kwame Panyin, Asantehene (1777–1803)
- Denkyira (complete list) –
  - Ntim Gyakari, Denkyirahene (1695–1701)

Guinea

- Imamate of Futa Jallon (complete list) –
  - Karamokho Alfa, Almami (c.1725–1751)
  - Ibrahim Sori, Almami (1751–1784)
  - Sa'id, Almami (c.1784–1797/8)

Guinea-Bissau

- Portuguese Guinea (complete list) –

Colony, 1474–1951
For details see the Kingdom of Portugal under Southwest Europe

Ivory Coast

- Gyaaman (complete list) –
  - Biri Kofi Panyin, Gyaamanhene (?–1720)
  - Abo Kofi, Gyaamanhene (1720–1746)
  - Kofi Sono, Gyaamanhene (1746–1760)
  - Agyeman, Gyaamanhene (1760–1790)
  - Biri Kofi Kadyo, Gyaamanhene (1790–1810)
- Kong Empire –
  - Seku Wattara, leader (1710–1735)

Liberia

Mali

- Bamana Empire –
  - Bitòn Coulibaly, Faama (1712–1755)
  - Dinkoro Coulibaly, Faama (1755–1757)
  - Ali Coulibaly, Faama (1757–c.1759)
  - Ngolo Diarra, Faama (1766–1795)
  - Mansong Diarra, Faama (1795–1808)
  - Da Monzon Diarra, Faama (1808–?)

Mauritania

Niger

- Sultanate of Damagaram (complete list) –
  - Mallam, Sultan (1731–1746)
  - Baba dan Mallam, Sultan (1746–1757)
  - Tanimoun Babani, Sultan (1757–1775)
  - Assafa dan Tanimoun, Sultan (1775–1782)
  - Abaza dan Tanimoun, Sultan (1782–1787)
  - Mallam Babou Saba, Sultan (1787–1790)
  - Daouda dan Tanimoun, Sultan (1790–1799)
  - Ahmadou dan Tanimoun, Sultan (1799–1812)
- Dendi Kingdom: Askiya dynasty (complete list) –
  - El Hadjj Hanga, Askiya (?–1761)
  - Samsou-Béri, Askiya (1761–1779)
  - Hargani, Askiya (1779–1793)
  - Samsou Keïna, Askiya (1793–1798)
  - Fodi Maÿroumfa, Askiya (1798–1805)
- Dosso Kingdom (complete list) –
  - Zarmakoy Aboubacar, King (c.1750–?)
  - Zarmakoy Laouzo, King (?)

Nigeria

- Akwa Akpa (Old Calabar) –
  - Ekpenyong Offiong Okoho, King (1786–1805)
- Kingdom of Bonny –

The following were the independent rulers of Okoloama.

  - Awusa "Halliday", King (1759–1760)
  - Perekule I, King (1760–?)
  - Fubara Manilla Pepple, King (?–1792)
  - Opubo Annie Pepple the Great, King (1792–1828)
- Bornu Empire (Kanem–Bornu): Sayfawa dynasty
  - Dunama VII, Mai (1696–1715)
  - Hamdan, Mai (1715–1729)
  - Muhammad VII of Bornu, Mai (1729–1744)
  - Dunama VIII Gana, Mai (1744–1447)
  - Ali III, Mai (1747–1792)
  - Ahmad, Mai (1792–1808)
- Gobir –
  - Bawa, Sultan (1777–1795)
  - Yakubu, Sultan (1795–1801)
- Sultanate of Kano (complete list) –
  - Dadi, Sultan (1670–1703)
  - Muhammad Sharif, Sultan (1703–1731)
  - Kumbari, Sultan (1731–1743)
  - al-Hajj Kabe, Sultan (1743–1753)
  - Yaji II, Sultan (1753–1768)
  - Baba Zaki, Sultan (1768–1776)
  - Daud Abasama II, Sultan (1776–1781)
  - Muhammad al-Walid, Sultan (1781–1805)
- Lagos (complete list) –
  - Ashipa, Oba (c.1682–1716)
  - Ado, Oba (1716–1755)
  - Gabaro, Oba (1755–1760)
  - Akinsemoyin, Oba (c.1760–1775)
  - Eletu Kekere, Oba (c.1775–1780)
  - Ologun Kutere, Oba (1780–1801) or until 1803
- Nembe Kingdom (complete list) –
  - Mingi I, King (1745–1766)
  - Ikata Mingi II, King (1766–1788)
  - Gboro Mingi III, King (1788–1800)
  - Kuko Mingi IV, King (1800–1832)
- Kingdom of Nri (complete list) –
  - Ezimilo, Eze Nri (1701–1723)
  - Èwenétem, Eze Nri (1724–1794)
  - Ènweleána I, Eze Nri (1795–1886)
- Oyo Empire (complete list) –
  - Ayibi, Alaafin (17th century or 18th century)
  - Osiyago, Alaafin (early 18th century)
  - Ojigi, Alaafin (c.1728–1730)
  - Gberu, Alaafin (c.1730–1746)
  - Amuniwaiye, Alaafin (1746)
  - Onisile, Alaafin (1746–1754)
  - Labisi, Alaafin (1754)
  - Awonbioju, Alaafin (1754)
  - Agboluaje, Alaafin (1754)
  - Majeogbe, Alaafin (1754–1770)
  - Abiodun, Alaafin (c.1770–1789)
  - Awole Arogangan, Alaafin (1789–1796)
  - Adebo, Alaafin (1796–1888)
- Yauri Emirate –
  - Muhammadu Dan Ayi dan Ahmadu Jerabana Albishir, Emir (1799–1829)

Senegal

- Kingdom of Jolof (complete list) –
  - Bakar Penda, Buur-ba (1670–1711)
  - Bakan-Tam Gan, Buur-ba (1711–1721)
  - al-Buri Dyakher, Buur-ba (1721–1740)
  - Birayamb, Buur-ba (1740–1748)
  - Birawa Keme, Buur-ba (1748–1750)
  - Lat-Kodu, Buur-ba (1750–1755)
  - Bakaa-Tam Buri-Nyabu, Buur-ba (1755–1763)
  - Mba Kompass, Buur-ba (1763–1800)
  - Mba Buri-Nyabu, Buur-ba (1800–1818)
- Cayor (complete list) –
  - Lat Sukabe, Damel (1697–1719)
  - Isa-Tende, Damel (1719–1748)
  - Isa Bige, Damel (1748–1749)
  - Ma-Bathio Samb, Damel (1749–1757)
  - Birima Kodu, Damel (1757–1758)
  - Isa Bige, Damel (1758–1759)
  - Birima Yamb, Damel (1759–1760)
  - Isa Bige Nagone, Damel (1760–1763)
  - Jor Yasin Isa, Damel (1763–1766)
  - Kodu Kumba, Damel (1766–1777)
  - Birima Fatim-Penda, Damel (1777–1790)
  - Amari Ngone Ndèla Kumba Fal, Damel (1790–1809)
- Imamate of Futa Toro (complete list) –
  - Abdelkedir, Almaami (1776–1804)
- Waalo (complete list) –
  - Naatago Aram Bakar, King (1674–1708)
  - Njak Aram Bakar Teedyek, King (1708–1733)
  - Yerim Nadate Bubu, King (1733–1734)
  - Meu Mbody Kumba Khedy, King (1734–1735)
  - Yerim Khode Fara Mboj, King (1735–1736)
  - Njak Xuri Yop, King (1736–1780)
  - Fara Penda Teg Rel, King (1780–c.1795)
  - Njak Kumba Xuri Yay Mboj, King (1795–1805)

Sierra Leone

- Kingdom of Koya (complete list) –
  - Naimbanna I, Bai (1680–1720)
  - Naimbanna II, Bai (1720–1793)
  - Farima IV, Bai (1793–1807)

Togo

== Americas ==
=== Caribbean ===
Antigua

- Colonial Antigua (complete list) –

British colony, 1632–1981
For details see the United Kingdom under British Isles, Europe

The Bahamas

- Colony of the Bahamas (complete list) –

British colony, 1648–1973
For details see the United Kingdom under British Isles, Europe

Barbados

- Colonial Barbados (complete list) –

British colony, 1625–1966
For details see the United Kingdom under British Isles, Europe

Cuba

- Captaincy General of Cuba (complete list) –

Spanish Colony, 1607–1898
For details see Spain in southwest Europe

Dominica

- French Dominica (complete list) –

French Colony, 1715–1763
For details see France in western Europe

- British Dominica (complete list) –

British Colony, 1763–1978
For details see the United Kingdom under British Isles, Europe

Saint Vincent and the Grenadines

- Colonial Saint Vincent and the Grenadines (complete list) –

British Colony, 1763–1979
For details see the United Kingdom under British Isles, Europe

Haiti

- Saint-Domingue (complete list) –

French Colony, 1625–1804
For details see France in western Europe

Netherlands

- Curaçao and Dependencies (complete list) –

Dutch colony 1634–1828, 1845–1954
For details see the Netherlands under western Europe

Saint Lucia

- French Saint Lucia (complete list) –

French colony, 1762–1802
For details see France in western Europe

Trinidad and Tobago

- Colonial Trinidad and Tobago (complete list) –

British colony, 1797–1962
For details see the United Kingdom under British Isles, Europe

=== Central ===
Belize

- Black River Settlements (complete list) –

British colony, 1749–1862
For details see the United Kingdom under British Isles, Europe

Guatemala

- Captaincy General of Guatemala (complete list) –

Spanish Colony, 1609–1821
For details see Spain in southwest Europe

Nicaragua

- Miskito Coast (complete list) –
  - Jeremy I, King (c.1687–1718)
  - Jeremy II, King (1718–1729)
  - Peter I, King (1729–1739)
  - Edward I, King (1739–1755)
  - George I, King (1755–1776)
  - George II Frederic, King (1776–1801)

=== North ===
Canada

- Canada (New France) (complete list) –

French colony, 1535–1763
For details see France under western Europe

- Newfoundland Colony (complete list) –

British colony, 1610–1907

- Colony of Quebec (complete list) –

British colony, 1763–1791

- Upper Canada (complete list) –

British colony, 1791–1841

- Lower Canada (complete list) –

British colony, 1791–1841
For details see the United Kingdom under British Isles, Europe

Mexico

- Viceroyalty of New Spain (complete list) –

Spanish Colony, 1521–1821
For details see Spain in southwest Europe

United States

- First Continental Congress of the United Colonies: Presidents –
  - Peyton Randolph, President (1774)
  - Henry Middleton, President (1774)
- Second Continental Congress of the United Colonies/ States: Presidents –
  - Peyton Randolph, President (1775)
  - John Hancock, President (1775–1777)
  - Henry Laurens, President (1777–1778)
  - John Jay, President (1778–1779)
  - Samuel Huntington, President (1779–1781)
- United States: Articles of Confederation: Presidents –
  - Samuel Huntington, President (1781)
  - Thomas McKean, President (1781)
  - John Hanson, President (1781–1782)
  - Elias Boudinot, President (1782–1783)
  - Thomas Mifflin, President (1783–1784)
  - Richard Henry Lee, President (1784–1785)
  - John Hancock, President (1785–1786)
  - Nathaniel Gorham, President (1786)
  - Arthur St. Clair, President (1787)
  - Cyrus Griffin, President (1788)
- United States: Constitution of the United States: President of the United States (complete list) –
  - George Washington, President (1789–1797)
  - John Adams, President (1797–1801)
- Cherokee Nation (complete list) –
  - Little Turkey, First Beloved Man (1788–1794), Principal Chief (1794–1801)
- State of Muskogee –
  - William Augustus Bowles, Director General (1799–1803)
- Vermont Republic (complete list) –
  - Joseph Marsh, Governor (1778–1779, 1790–1791)
  - Moses Robinson, Governor (1779–1790)

=== South ===
Argentina

- Viceroyalty of the Río de la Plata (complete list) –

Spanish Colony, 1776–1814
For details see Spain in southwest Europe

Brazil

- Colonial Brazil (complete list) –

Portuguese colony, 1500/1534–1808
For details see the Kingdom of Portugal under Southwest Europe

Chile

- Captaincy General of Chile (complete list) –

Spanish Colony, 1541–1818
For details see Spain in southwest Europe

Colombia

- Viceroyalty of New Granada (complete list) –

Spanish Colony, 1717–1723, 1739–1810, 1815–1821
For details see Spain in southwest Europe

Peru

- Viceroyalty of Peru (complete list) –

Spanish Colony, 1542–1824
For details see Spain in southwest Europe

Suriname

- Dutch Surinam (complete list) –

Dutch colony 1667–1954
For details see the Netherlands under western Europe

== Asia ==
=== Central ===
Kazakhstan

- Dzungar Khanate (complete list) –
  - Tsewang Arabtan, Khong Tayiji (1694–1727)
  - Galdan Tseren, Khong Tayiji (1727–1745)
  - Tsewang Dorji Namjal, Khong Tayiji (1746–1749)
  - Lama Dorji, Khong Tayiji (1750–1753)
  - Dawachi, Khong Tayiji (1752–1755)
  - Amursana, ruler (c.1755–1757)
- Kazakh Khanate (complete list) –
  - Tauke, Khan (1680–1718)
- Junior zhuz (complete list) –
  - Abul Khair, Khan (1718–1748)
  - Nuraly, Khan (1748–1786)
  - Eraly, Khan (1791–1794)
  - Esim, Khan (1795–1797)
  - Aishuaq, Khan (1797–1805)
- Middle zhuz (complete list) –
  - Sameke, Khan (1719–1734)
  - Abilmambet, Khan (1734–1771)
  - Ablai, Khan (1771–1781)
  - Uali, Khan (1781–1819)

Tajikistan

- Yarkent Khanate, Western Moghulistan (complete list) –
  - Akbash, Khan (1695–1705)

Tibet

- Khoshut Khanate of Tibet
  - Khans (complete list) –
    - Lha-bzang, Khan (1697–1717)
  - Dalai Lamas (complete list) –
    - Tsangyang Gyatso, 6th Dalai Lama (1697–1706)
- Tibet under Qing rule (Qing emperors / Dalai Lamas) –

Manchu overlordship, 1720–1912
For details see the Qing dynasty under Eastern Asia

Uzbekistan

- Khanate of Bukhara –
  - Subhan Quli, Khan (1680–1702)
  - Muhammad Ubaidullah, Khan (1702–1711)
  - Abu'l-Faiz, Khan (1711–1747)
  - Muhammad Abd al-Mumin, Khan (1747–1748)
  - Muhammad Ubaidullah II, Khan (1748–1753, nominal)
  - Muhammad Rahim (usurper), atalik (1753–1756), Khan (1756–1758)
  - Shir Ghazi, Khan (1758-?)
  - Abu'l Ghazi, Khan (1758–1785)
- Emirate of Bukhara –
  - Shah Murad bin Daniyal Bey, Amir (1785–1800)
- Khanate of Kokand –
  - Shahrukh Bey, Khan (c.1709–1721)
  - Abdul Rahim Bey, Khan (c.1721–1733)
  - Abdul Kahrim Bey, Khan (c.1733–1750)
  - Abdurakhman-Batir, Khan (c.1750)
  - Irdana, Khan (c.1750–1752)
  - Bobobek, Khan (c.1752–1753)
  - Irdana, Khan (c.1753–1764)
  - Suleiman Bey, Khan (c.1764)
  - Shahruhk III, Khan (c.1764)
  - Narbuta Bey, Khan (c.1764–1801)
- Khanate of Khiva (complete list) –
  - Ishaq Agha Shah Niyaz, Khan (1698–1701)
  - Awrang II, Khan (1701–1702)
  - rShakhbakht Khan, Khan (1702–03)
  - Sayyid Ali Khan, Khan (1703)
  - Musa, Khan (1702–1712)
  - Yadigar I, Khan (1712–1713)
  - Awrang III, Khan (c.1713–c.1714)
  - Haji Muhammad II, Khan (c.1714)
  - Shir Ghazi, Khan (1714–1727)
  - Sarigh Ayghir, Khan (1727)
  - Bahadur, Khan (1727–1728)
  - Ilbars II, Khan (1728–1740)
  - Tahir, Khan (1740–1742)
  - Nurali I, Khan (1742)
  - Abu Muhammad, Khan (1742)
  - Abu al-Ghazi II Muhammad, Khan (1742–1747)
  - Ghaib, Khan (Kaip Khan), Khan (1747–1758)
  - Abdullah Qara Beg, Khan (1758)
  - Timur Ghazi, Khan (1758–1764)
  - Tawke, Khan (1764–1766)
  - Shah Ghazi, Khan (1766–1768)
  - Abu al-Ghazi III, Khan (1768–1769)
  - Nurali II, Khan (1769)
  - Jahangir, Khan (1769–1770)
  - Bölekey, Khan (1770)
  - Aqim, Khan (1770–1771, c.1772–c.1773)
  - Abd al-Aziz, Khan (c.1771)
  - Artuq Ghazi, Khan (c.1772)
  - Abdullah, Khan (c.1772)
  - Aqim, Khan (1770–1771, c.1772–c.1773)
  - Yadigar II, Khan (c.1773–1775, 1779–1781, 1783–1790)
  - Abu'l Fayz, Khan (1775–1779)
  - Yadigar II, Khan (c.1773–1775, 1779–1781, 1783–1790)
  - Pulad Ghazi, Khan (1781–1783)
  - Yadigar II, Khan (c.1773–1775, 1779–1781, 1783–1790)
  - Abu al-Ghazi IV, Khan (1790–1802)
- Kalmyk Khanate (complete list) –
  - Ayuka, Khan (1672–1723)
  - Tseren Donduk, Khan (1723–1735)
  - Donduk Ombo, Khan (1735–1741)
  - Donduk Dashi, Khan (1741–1761)
  - Ubashi, Khan (1761–1771)
  - Dodbi, Khan (1771–1781)
  - As Saray, Khan (1781)

=== East ===
China: Qing dynasty

- Qing dynasty (complete list) –
  - Kangxi, Emperor (1661–1722)
  - Yongzheng, Emperor (1722–1735)
  - Qianlong, Emperor (1735–1796)
  - Jiaqing, Emperor (1796–1820)

Japan

- Tokugawa shogunate of Japan
  - Emperors (complete list) –
    - Higashiyama, Emperor (1687–1709)
    - Nakamikado, Emperor (1709–1735)
    - Sakuramachi, Emperor (1735–1747)
    - Momozono, Emperor (1747–1762)
    - Go-Sakuramachi, Empress (1762–1771)
    - Go-Momozono, Emperor (1771–1779)
    - Kōkaku, Emperor (1780–1817)
  - Shōguns (complete list) –
    - Tokugawa Tsunayoshi, Shōgun (1680–1709)
    - Tokugawa Ienobu, Shōgun (1709–1712)
    - Tokugawa Ietsugu, Shōgun (1713–1716)
    - Tokugawa Yoshimune, Shōgun (1716–1745)
    - Tokugawa Ieshige, Shōgun (1745–1760)
    - Tokugawa Ieharu, Shōgun (1760–1786)
    - Tokugawa Ienari, Shōgun (1787–1837)
- Ryukyu Kingdom: Second Shō dynasty –

Vassal state of Satsuma Domain, 1609–1872

  - Shō Tei, King (1669–1709)
  - Shō Eki, King (1710–1712)
  - Shō Kei, King (1713–1752)
  - Shō Boku, King (1752–1794)
  - Shō On, King (1795–1802)

Korea

- Joseon (complete list) –
  - Sukjong, King (1674–1720)
  - Gyeongjong, King (1720–1724)
  - Yeongjo, King (1724–1776)
  - Jeongjo, King (1776–1800)
  - Sunjo, King (1800–1834)

=== Southeast ===
Brunei

- Bruneian Empire (complete list) –
  - Nassaruddin, Sultan (1690–1710)
  - Hussin Kamaluddin, Sultan (1710–1730, 1737–1740)
  - Muhammad Alauddin, Sultan (1730–1737)
  - Omar Ali Saifuddin I, Sultan (1740–1778)
  - Muhammad Tajuddin, Sultan (1778–1804, 1804–1807)

Cambodia

- Kingdom of Cambodia: Middle Period (complete list) –
  - Chey Chettha IV, King (1675–1695, 1696–1699, 1700–1702, 1703–1706)
  - Thommoreachea III or Sri Dhamaraja III, King (1702–1703, 1706–1709, 1738–1747)
  - Barom Ramadhipati or Kaev Hua III, King (1699–1700, 1710–1722)
  - Satha II or Paramaraja X, King (1722–1729, 1729–1736, 1749)
  - Thommoreachea IV or Sri Dhamaraja IV, King (1747)
  - Ang Sngoun, King (1749–1755)
  - Ang Tong, King (1755–1758)
  - Outey II, King (1758–1775)
  - Ang Non II, King (1775–1779)
  - Ang Eng, King (1777–1796)

Indonesia

- Dutch East Indies (complete list) –

Dutch colony 1800–1811, 1816–1949
For details see the Netherlands under western Europe

Indonesia: Java

- Banten Sultanate (complete list) –
  - Abdul Mahasin Muhammad Zainulabidin, Sultan (1690–1733)
  - Abdul Fatah Muhammad Syafei, Sultan (1733–1748)
  - Ratu Sarifah Fatima, Regent (1748–1750)
  - Abu’lma’ali Muhammad Wasi al-Halimin, Sultan (1750–1753)
  - Abu Nazar Muhammad Arif Zainal Asyekin, Sultan (1753–1777)
  - Abdul Mofakhir Muhammad Aliuddin I, Sultan (1777–1802)
- Blambangan Kingdom (complete list) –
  - Pangeran Putr, King (1697–1736)
  - Danuningrat, King (1736–1763)
  - Pangeran Wilis, King (1767–1768)
- Sultanate of Cirebon: Kraton Kacirebonan (complete list) –
  - Pangeran Arya Cirebon, Kamaruddin, Sultan (1697–1723)
  - Cirebon I Muhammad Akbaruddin, Sultan (1723–1734)
  - Cirebon II Muhammad Salihuddin, Sultan (1734–1758)
  - Cirebon III Muhammad Harruddin, Sultan (1758–1768)
- Cirebon, Keraton Kasepuhan (complete list) –
  - Sepuh II Jamaluddin, Sultan (1697–1723)
  - Sepuh III Muhammad Zainuddin, Sultan (1723–1753)
  - Sepuh IV Muhammad Zainuddin, Sultan (1753–1773)
  - Sepuh V Sapiuddin, Sultan (1773–1786)
  - Sepuh VI, Sultan (1786–1791)
  - Sepuh VII Joharuddin, Sultan (1791–1816)
- Cirebon, Kraton Kanoman (complete list) –
  - Anom I Badruddin, Sultan (1662–1703)
  - Anom II, Sultan (1703–1706)
  - Anom III Muhammad Alimuddin, Sultan (1719–1732)
  - Anom IV Khairuddin, Sultan (1744–1797)
  - Anom V Imanuddin, Sultan (1797–1807)
- Cirebon, Panembahan line (complete list) –
  - Panembahan Cirebon I Muhammad Nasruddin, Sultan (1662–1714)
  - Panembahan Cirebon II Muhammad Muhyiddin, Sultan (1725–1731)
  - Panembahan Cirebon III Muhammad Tair Yarini Sabirin, Sultan (1752–1773)
- Cirebon, Panembahan line (complete list) –
  - Pangeran Arya Cirebon, Kamaruddin, Sultan (1697–1723)
  - Cirebon I Muhammad Akbaruddin, Sultan (1723–1734)
  - Cirebon II Muhammad Salihuddin, Sultan (1734–1758)
  - Cirebon III Muhammad Harruddin, Sultan (1758–1768)
- Bangkalan –
  - Cakraningrat II, Sultan (1648–1707)
  - Cakraningrat III, Sultan (1707–1718)
  - Cakraningrat IV, Sultan (1718–1745)
  - Cakraningrat V, Sultan (1745–1770)
  - Cakraningrat VI, Sultan (1770–1780)
  - Cakraningrat VII, Sultan (1780–1815)
- Mataram Sultanate (complete list) –
  - Amangkurat II, Susuhunan (1677–1703)
  - Amangkurat III, Susuhunan (1703–1704)
  - Pakubuwono I, Susuhunan (1704–1719)
  - Amangkurat IV, Susuhunan (1719–1726)
  - Pakubuwono II, Susuhunan (1726–1749)
  - Pakubuwono III, Susuhunan of Mataram (1749–1755); Susuhunan of Surakarta (1755–1788)

Split into Surakarta and Yogyakarta

- Sumenep –
  - Pulang Jiwa, Sultan (1684–1702)
  - Cakranegara I, Sultan (1702–1705)
  - Suderma, Sultan (1705–1707)
  - Cakranegara II, Sultan (1707–1737)
  - Cakranegara III, Sultan (1737–1750)
  - Bendara Saud, Sultan (1750–1767)
  - Tirtanegara, Sultan (1767–1811)
- Pamekasan –
  - Adikara I, Sultan (1685–1708)
  - Adikara II, Sultan (1708–1737)
  - Adikara III, Sultan (1737–1743)
  - Adikara IV, Sultan (1743–1750)
  - Adiningrat, Sultan (1750–1752)
  - Aria Cakraadiningrat I, R. Alsari, Sultan (1752–1800)
  - Aria Cakraadiningrat II, R. Alsana, Sultan (1800–1804)
- Pasuruan –
  - Surapati, Wiranegara I, Sultan (1686–1706)
  - Wiranegara II, Sultan (1706–1707)
- Surakarta Sunanate (complete list) –
  - Pakubuwono III, Susuhunan of Mataram (1749–1755); Susuhunan of Surakarta (1755–1788)
  - Pakubuwono IV, Sultan (1788–1820)
- Yogyakarta Sultanate (complete list) –
  - Hamengkubuwono I, Sultan (1755–1792)
  - Hamengkubuwono II, Sultan (1792–1810, 1811–1812, 1826–1828)
- Mangkunegaran (complete list) –
  - Mangkunegara I, Sultan (1757–1795)
  - Mangkunegara II, Sultan (1795–1835)

Indonesia: Sumatra

- Aceh Sultanate (complete list) –
  - Badr ul-Alam Syarif Hasyim Jamaluddin, Sultan (1699–1702)
  - Perkasa Alam Syarif Lamtui, Sultan (1702–1703)
  - Jamal ul-Alam Badr ul-Munir, Sultan (1703–1726)
  - Jauhar ul-Alam, Sultan (1726)
  - Syamsul Alam, Sultan (1726–1727)
  - Alauddin Ahmad Syah, Sultan (1727–1735)
  - Alauddin Johan Syah, Sultan (1735–1760)
  - Alauddin Mahmud Syah I, Sultan (1760–1781)
  - Badr ul-Alam Syah, Sultan (1764–1765)
  - Sulaiman Syah, Sultan (1773)
  - Alauddin Muhammad Syah, Sultan (1781–1795)
  - Alauddin Jauhar ul-Alam Syah, Sultan (1795–1815, 1819–1823)
- Sultanate of Deli (complete list) –
  - Tuanku Panglima Paderap, Sultan (1698–1728)
  - Tuanku Panglima Pasutan, Sultan (1728–1761)
  - Tuanku Panglima Gandar Wahid, Sultan (1761–1805)
- Sultanate of Langkat –
  - Bendahara Raja Badiuzzaman, Raja (1673–1750)
  - Kejuruan Hitam (Tuah Hitam), Raja (1750–1818)
- Sultanate of Siak Sri Indrapura (complete list) –
  - Abdul Jalil Rahmad Shah I, Sultan (1725–1746)
  - Abdul Jalil Rahmad Shah II, Sultan (1746–1765)
  - Abdul Jalil Jalaluddin Shah, Sultan (1765–1766)
  - Abdul Jalil Alamuddin Shah, Sultan (1766–1780)
  - Muhammad Ali Abdul Jalil Muazzam Shah, Sultan (1780–1782)
  - Yahya Abdul Jalil Muzaffar Shah, Sultan (1782–1784)
  - Al-Sayyid al-Sharif Ali Abdul Jalil Syaifuddin Ba'alawi, Sultan (1784–1810)
- Sultanate of Serdang (complete list) –
  - Kejeruan Junjungan, Raja (1728–1782)
  - Al-Marhum Kacapuri, Raja (1782–1822)
- Riau-Lingga Sultanate
  - Sultans –
    - Abdul Jalil Shah IV, Sultan (1699–1720)
    - Abdul Jalil Rahmat Shah, Sultan (1718–1722)
    - Sulaiman Badrul Alam Shah, Sultan (1722–1760)
    - Abdul Jalil Muazzam Shah, Sultan (1760–1761)
    - Ahmad Riayat Shah, Sultan (1761–1761)
    - Mahmud Shah III, Sultan (1761–1812)
  - Yang di-Pertuan Mudas –
    - Daeng Marewah, Yang di-Pertuan Muda (1722–1728)
    - Daeng Chelak, Yang di-Pertuan Muda (1728–1745)
    - Daeng Kemboja, Yang di-Pertuan Muda (1745–1777)
    - Haji, Yang di-Pertuan Muda (1777–1784)
    - Ali, Yang di-Pertuan Muda (1784–1805)
- Jambi Sultanate –
  Sultan Sri Maharaja Batu, Sultan (1690–1721)
  Ahmad Zainuddin/ Anom Sri Ingalaga, Sultan (1770–1790)
  Ratu Seri Ingalaga, Sultan (1790–1812)

Indonesia: Kalimantan (Borneo)

- Sultanate of Banjar (complete list) –
  - Tahmidullah I, Sultan (1700–1717)
  - Panembahan Kasuma Dilaga, Sultan (1717–1730)
  - Hamidullah, Sultan (1730–1734)
  - Tamjidullah I, Sultan (1734–1759)
  - Muhammadillah/Muhammad Aliuddin Aminullah, Sultan (1759–1761)
  - Tahmidullah II/Sultan Nata, Sultan (1761–1801)
- Bulungan –
  - Digendung, putra Wira Keranda, Wira (1695–1731)
  - Amir, Putera Wira Digendung Gelar Sultan Amiril Mukminin, Wira (1731–1777)
  - Aji Muhammad, Sultan (1777–1817)
- Kutai Kartanegara Sultanate –
  - Aji Muhammad Idris, Sultan (c.1732–1739)
  - Aji Muhammad Muslihuddin, Sultan (1780s)
- Lanfang Republic –
  - Luo Fangbo, President (1777–1795)
  - Jiang Wubo, President (1795–1799)
  - Yan Sibo, President (1799–1804)
- Pontianak Sultanate (complete list) –
  - Syarif Abdurrahman Alkadrie, Sultan (1771–1808)
- Sultanate of Sambas (complete list) –
  - Muhammad Taj ud-din I, Sultan (1685–1708)
  - Umar Aqam ud-din I, Sultan (1708–1732)
  - Abu Bakar Kamal ud-din I, Sultan (1732–1764)
  - Umar Akam ud-din II, Sultan (1764–1786)
  - Achmad Taj ud-din II, Sultan (1786–1793)
  - Abu Bakar Taj ud-din I, Sultan (1793–1815)
- Sultanate of Sintang –
  - Sri Paduka Muhammad Shams ud-din Sa'id ul-Khairiwaddien Sultan Nata, Sultan (1672–1738)
  - Sri Paduka 'Abdu'l Rahman Muhammad Jalal ud-din ibni al-Marhum Muhammad Shams ud-din Sa'id ul-Khairiwaddien Aman, Sultan (1738–1786)
  - Sri Paduka 'Abdu'l Rashid Muhammad Jamal ud-din ibni al-Marhum 'Abdu'l Rahman Muhammad Jalal ud-din Ajib, Sultan (1786–1796)
  - Sri Paduka Muhammad Qamar ud-din ibni al-Marhum Sultan 'Abdu'l Rashid Muhammad Jamal ud-din, Sultan (1796–1851)

Indonesia: Sulawesi

- Sultanate of Gowa –
  - Abdul Jalil, Sultan (1677–1709)
  - Ismail, Sultan (1709–1711)
  - Sirajuddin, Sultan (1711–?)
  - Najamuddin, Sultan (18th century)
  - Sirajuddin, Sultan (1735–1735)
  - Abdul Khair, Sultan (1735–1742)
  - Abdul Kudus, Sultan (1742–1753)
  - Amas Madina Batara Gowa, Sultan (1753–1767)
  - I Mallisujawa Daeng Riboko Arungmampu, Sultan (1767–1769)
  - Zainuddin, Sultan (1770–1778)
  - I Manawari Karaeng Bontolangkasa, Sultan (1778–1810)
- Luwu –
  - Settiaraja, Datu (1663–1704)
  - La Onro Topalaguna, Datu (1704–1715)
  - Batari Tungke, Datu (1706–1715)
  - Batari Tojang, Datu (1715–1748)
  - We Tenri Leleang, Datu (1748–1778)
  - Tosibengngareng, Datu (1760–1765)
  - La Tenri Peppang, Datu (1778–1810)

Indonesia: Lesser Sunda Islands

- Kingdom of Larantuka –
  - Domingos Viera, Raja (c.1702)
- Bima Sultanate (complete list) –
  - Hasanuddin Muhammad Ali Syah, Sultan (1697–1731)
  - Alauddin Muhammad Syah, Sultan (1731–1748)
  - Kamalat Syah, Sultan (1748–1751)
  - Abdul Kadim Muhammad Syah, Sultan (1751–1773)
  - Abdul Hamid Muhammad Syah, Sultan (1773–1817)

Indonesia: West Timor

- Wehali –
  - Jacinto Correia, Liurai (c.1756)
- Amanatun (complete list) –
  - Don Louis Nai Konof, Raja (pre-1751–1766)
  - Don Joan Benao, Raja (1766–?)
- Amarasi (complete list) –
  - Dom Affonco, Raja (c.1703)
  - Dom Augusto Fernandes, Raja (c.1703)
  - Nai Soti, Raja (c.1714)
  - Dom Luís Hornay, Raja (pre-1749–1752)
  - Dom Affonco Hornay, Raja (1752–1774)
  - Don Rote Ruatefu, Raja (1774–1802)
- Amabi (complete list) –
  - Ama Kefi Meu, Raja (1666–1704)
  - Ama Kefi, Raja (1704–1725)
  - Loti, Raja (1725–1732)
  - Nai Balas, Raja (1732–1755)
  - Balthazar Loti, Raja (1755–1790)
  - Osu I, Raja (1791–1795)
  - Slolo, Raja (1795–c.1797)
  - Afu Balthazar, Raja (c.1797–pre-1824)
- Sonbai Besar (complete list) –
  - Dom Pedro Sonbai/ Tomenu, Emperor (c.1704–1726)
  - Dom Alfonso Salema/ Nai Bau Sonbai, Emperor (pre-1748–1752)
  - Don Bernardo/ Nai Sobe Sonbai I, Emperor (1752–1760)
  - Albertus Johannes Taffy/ Nai Tafin Sonbai, Emperor (1760–1768)
  - Alphonsus Adrianus/ Nai Kau Sonbai, Emperor (1768–1802)
- Sonbai Kecil (complete list) –
  - Bi Sonbai/ Usi Tetu Utang, Queen (1672–1717)
  - Bernardus Leu, Raja (1717–1726)
  - Corneo Leu, Raja (1728–1748)
  - Daniel Taffy Leu, Raja (1748–1760)
  - Jacobus Albertus Taffy, Raja (1760–1776)
  - Nai Kau Sonbai, Raja (1776–1783)
  - Baki Bena/ Bernardus Nisnoni, Raja (1783–1795)
  - Dirk Hendrik Aulasi, Raja (1795–1798)
  - Nube Bena/ Pieter Nisnoni I, Raja (1798–1820)
- Amanuban (complete list) –
  - Don Michel, Raja (pre-1749–1751)
  - Don Louis, Raja (1751–1770)
  - Don Jacobus Albertus, Raja (1770–1786)
  - Tobani, Raja (1786–c.1807)

Indonesia: Maluku Islands

- Sultanate of Bacan (complete list) –

Dutch protectorate 1667–1942

  - Alauddin II, Sultan (1660–1706)
  - Musa Malikuddin, Sultan (1706–1715)
  - Kie Nasiruddin, Sultan (1715–1732)
  - Hamza Tarafan Nur, Sultan (1732–1741)
  - Muhammad Sahaddin, Sultan (1741–1780)
  - Skandar Alam, Sultan (1780–1788)
  - Muhammad Badaruddin, Sultan (1788–1797)
  - Kamarullah, Sultan (1797–1826)
- Sultanate of Jailolo –

British occupation 1799–1802

  - Muhammad Arif Bila, Sultan (1797–1806)
- Sultanate of Tidore (complete list) –

Dutch protectorate 1657–1905

  - Hamza Faharuddin, Sultan (1689–1705)
  - Abdul Falali Mansur, Sultan (1705–1708)
  - Hasanuddin, Sultan (1708–1728)
  - Amir Muiduddin Malikulmanan, Sultan (1728–1757)
  - Amir Muhammad Masud Jamaluddin, Sultan (1757–1779)
  - Gayjira, Sultan (regent 1779–1780)
  - Patra Alam, Sultan (1780–1783)
  - Hairul Alam Kamaluddin, Sultan (1784–1797)
  - Nuku, Muhammad al-Mabus Amiruddin Syah, Sultan (1797–1805)
- Sultanate of Ternate (complete list) –

Dutch protectorate 1683–1915

  - Said Fathullah, Sultan (1689–1714)
  - Amir Iskandar Zulkarnain Saifuddin, Sultan (1714–1751)
  - Ayan Shah, Sultan (1751–1754)
  - Syah Mardan, Sultan (1755–1763)
  - Jalaluddin, Sultan (1763–1774)
  - Harun Shah, Sultan (1774–1781)
  - Achral, Sultan (1781–1796)
  - Muhammad Yasin, Sultan (1796–1801)

Laos

- Lan Xang (complete list) –
  - Setthathirath II, King (1700–1707)
- Kingdom of Vientiane (complete list) –
  - Setthathirath II, King (1707–1735)
  - Ong Long, King (1735–1767)

Vassal to Burma (1765–1768)

  - Ong Boun, King (1767–1778, 1780–1781)

Vassal to Siam (1778–1826)

  - Phraya Supho, Siamese Governor (1778–1780)
  - Ong Boun, King (1767–1778, 1780–1781)
  - Nanthasen, King (1781–1794)
  - Intharavong, King (1795–1805)
- Muang Phuan (complete list) –
  - Kham Sattha, King (1723–1751)
  - Ong Lo, King (1751–1779)
  - Somphou, King (1779–1803)
- Kingdom of Champasak (complete list) –
  - Nokasad, King (1713–1737)
  - Sayakumane, King (1737–1791)
  - Fay Na, King (1791–1811)
- Kingdom of Luang Phrabang (complete list) –
  - Kingkitsarat, King (1707–1713)
  - Ong Kham, King (1713–1723)
  - Inthasom, King (1723–1749)
  - Inthaphom, King (1749)
  - Sotika Koumane, King (1749–1771)

Vassal to Burma (1765–1779)

  - Suriyawong, King (1771–1779)
  - Anourouth, King (1791–1817)

Malaysia: Peninsular

- Kedah Sultanate (complete list) –
  - Abdullah Mu'adzam Shah, Sultan, (1698–1706)
  - Ahmad Tajuddin Halim Shah I, Sultan, (1706–1710)
  - Muhammad Jiwa Zainal Adilin Mu'adzam Shah II, Sultan, (1710–1778)
  - Abdullah Mukarram Shah, Sultan, (1778–1797)
  - Dziaddin Mukarram Shah II, Sultan, (1797–1803)
- Kelantan Sultanate (complete list) –

Champa dynasty

  - Omar Ibni Al-Marhum Raja Sakti I, Sultan (1675–1721)

Patani dynasty

  - Long Bahar, Raja (1721–1734)
  - Long Sulaiman, Raja (1734–1739, 1746–1756)
  - Long Pandak, Sultan (1756–1758)
  - Long Muhammad, Sultan (1758–1763)
  - Long Yunus, Sultan (1765–1795)
  - Tengku Muhammad, Sultan (1795–1800)
  - Muhammad I, Sultan (1800–1835)
- Johor Sultanate (complete list) –
  - Abdul Jalil Shah IV, Sultan (1699–1720)
  - Abdul Jalil Rahmat Shah I, Sultan (1718–1722)
  - Sulaiman Badrul Alam Shah, Sultan (1722–1760)
  - Abdul Jalil Muazzam Shah, Sultan (1760–1761)
  - Ahmad Riayat Shah, Sultan (1761–1770)
  - Mahmud Shah III, Sultan (1770–1811)
- Perak Sultanate: Siak dynasty (complete list) –
  - Mahmud Iskandar Shah, Sultan (1653–1720)
  - Alauddin Mughayat Shah, Sultan (1720–1728)
  - Muzaffar Riayat Shah III, Sultan of Upper Perak (1728–1752)
  - Muhammad Mughayat Shah, Sultan of Lower Perak (1744–1750)
  - Iskandar Zulkarnain, Sultan (1752–1765)
  - Mahmud Shah II, Sultan (1765–1773)
  - Alauddin Mansur Shah Iskandar Muda, Sultan (1773–1786)
  - Ahmaddin Shah, Sultan (1786–1806)
- Terengganu Sultanate (complete list) –
  - Zainal Abidin I, Sultan (1725–1733)
  - Mansur Shah I, Sultan (1733–1793)
  - Zainal Abidin II, Sultan (1793–1808)
- Selangor Sultanate (complete list) –
  - Raja Lumu, Sultan (1745–1778)
  - Ibrahim Shah, Sultan (1778–1826)
- Negeri Sembilan (complete list) –
  - Melewar, Yamtuan (1773–1795)
  - Hitam, Yamtuan (1795–1808)
- Perlis (complete list) –
  - Syed Abu Bakar Harun Jamalullail, Penghulu (1797–1825)

Myanmar / Burma

- Kingdom of Mrauk U (complete list) –
  - Sanda Wimala I, King (1700–1707)
  - Sanda Thuriya II, King (1707–1710)
  - Sanda Wizaya, King (1710–1731)
  - Sanda Thuriya III, King (1731–1734)
  - Naradipati II, King (1734–1735)
  - Narapawara, King (1735–1737)
  - Sanda Wizala, King (1737–1738)
  - Madarit, King (1738–1743)
  - Nara Apaya, King (1743–1761)
  - Thirithu, King (1761–1762)
  - Sanda Parama, King (1762–1764)
  - Apaya, King (1764–1774)
  - Sanda Thumana, King (1774–1777)
  - Sanda Wimala II, King (1777–1777)
  - Sanda Thaditha, King (1777–1782)
  - Maha Thammada, King (1782–1785)
- Toungoo dynasty (complete list) –
  - Sanay Min, King (1698–1714)
  - Taninganway Min, King (1714–1733)
  - Mahadhammaraza Dipadi, King (1733–1752)
- Restored Hanthawaddy Kingdom (complete list) –
  - Smim Htaw Buddhaketi, King (1740–1747)
  - Binnya Dala, King (1747–1757)
- Konbaung dynasty (complete list) –
  - Alaungpaya, King (1752–1760)
  - Naungdawgyi, King (1760–1763)
  - Hsinbyushin, King (1763–1776)
  - Singu, King (1776–1782)
  - Phaungka, King (1782)
  - Bodawpaya, King (1782–1819)

Philippines

- Sultanate of Sulu (complete list) –
  - Shahab ud-Din, Sultan (1685–1710)
  - Mustafa Shafi ud-Din, Sultan (1710–1718)
  - Badar ud-Din I, Sultan (1718–1732)
  - Nasar ud-Din, Sultan (1732–1735)
  - Azim ud-Din I, Sultan (1735–1748, 1764–1773)
  - Bantilan Muizzud-Din, Sultan (1748–1763)
  - Mohammad Israel, Sultan (1773–1778)
  - Azim ud-Din II, Sultan (1763–1764, 1778–1791)
  - Sharap ud-Din, Sultan (1789–1808)
- Sultanate of Maguindanao (complete list) –
  - Kahar Ud-din Kuda, Sultan (?–1702)
  - Bayan Ul-Anwar, Sultan (1702–1736)
  - Muhammad Tahir Ud-din, Sultan (1736–?)
  - Pakir Maulana Kamsa, Sultan (1734–1755)
  - Pahar Ud-din, Sultan (1755–?)
  - Kibad Sahriyal, Sultan (c.1780–c.1805)
- Spanish East Indies, part of the Captaincy General of the Philippines (complete list) –

Colony, 1565–1901
For details see Spain in southwest Europe

Thailand

- Ayutthaya Kingdom: Ban Phlu Luang dynasty (complete list) –
  - Phetracha, King (1688–1703)
  - Suriyenthrathibodi, King (1703–1709)
  - Thai Sa, King (1709–1733)
  - Borommakot, King (1733–1758)
  - Uthumphon, King (1758)
  - Ekkathat, King (1758–1767)
- Lan Na: Burmese rule (complete list) –
  - Che Putarai, King (1675–1707)
  - Mang Raenra, King (1707–1727)
  - Thepsing, King (1727)
  - Ong Kham, King (1727–1759)
  - Ong Chan, King (1759–1761)
  - Khihut, King (1761–1763)
  - Po Aphaikhamini, King (1763–1768)
  - Po Mayu-nguan, King (1768–1775)
- Lampang –
  - Thipchang, King (1732–1759)
  - Chaikaeo, Prince (1759–1774)
  - Kawila, Prince of Lampang (1774–1782), King of Chiang Mai (1802–1813)
- Pattani Kingdom: First Kelantanese dynasty (complete list) –
  - Emas Kelantan, Raja (1690–1704 or 1670–1698)
  - Emas Chayam, Queen (1704–1707 or 1698–1702 and 1716–1718)
  - Dewi, Raja (1707–1716)
  - Bendang Badan, Raja (1716–1720 or ?–1715)
  - Laksamana Dajang, Raja (1720–1721)
  - Alung Yunus, Raja (1718/28–1729)
  - Yunus, Raja (1729–1749)
  - Long Nuh, Raja (1749–1771)
  - Muhammad, Sultan (1771–1785)
  - Tengku Lamidin, ruler (1785–1791)
  - Datuk Pengkalan, ruler (1791–1808)
- Rattanakosin Kingdom of Siam (complete list) –
  - Rama I, King (1782–1809)
- Thonburi Kingdom (complete list) –
  - Taksin, King (1767–1782)

Timor

- Portuguese Timor (complete list) –

Colony, 1702–1975
For details see the Kingdom of Portugal under Southwest Europe

Vietnam

- Champa (complete list) –
  - Po Saktirai da putih, King (1695–1728)
  - Po Ganvuh da putih, King (1728–1730)
  - Po Thuttirai, King (1731–1732)
  - Po Rattirai, King (1735–1763)
  - Po Tathun da moh-rai, King (1763–1765)
  - Po Tithuntirai da paguh, King (1765–1780)
  - Po Tithuntirai da parang, King (1780–1781)
  - Chei Krei Brei, King (1783–1786)
  - Po Tithun da parang, King (1786–1793)
  - Po Lathun da paguh, King (1793–1799)
  - Po Chong Chan, King (1799–1822)
- Đại Việt: Revival Lê dynasty (complete list) –
  - Lê Hi Tông, Emperor (1676–1704)
  - Lê Dụ Tông, Emperor (1705–1728)
  - Lê Duy Phường, Emperor (1729–1732)
  - Lê Thuần Tông, Emperor (1732–1735)
  - Lê Ý Tông, Emperor (1735–1740)
  - Lê Hiển Tông, Emperor (1740–1786)
  - Lê Mẫn Đế, Emperor (1787–1789)
- Đàng Ngoài: Trịnh lords (complete list) –
  - Trịnh Căn, Lord (1682–1709)
  - Trịnh Cương, Lord (1709–1729)
  - Trịnh Giang, Lord (1729–1740)
  - Trịnh Doanh, Lord (1740–1767)
  - Trịnh Sâm, Lord (1767–1782)
  - Trịnh Cán, Lord (1782)
  - Trịnh Khải, Lord (1782–1786)
  - Trịnh Bồng, Lord (1786–1787)
- Đại Việt: Tây Sơn dynasty (complete list) –
  - Nguyễn Nhạc, Emperor (1778–1788)
  - Nguyễn Huệ, Emperor (1788–1792)
  - Nguyễn Quang Toản, Emperor (1792–1802)
- Đàng Trong: Nguyễn lords (complete list) –
  - Nguyễn Phúc Chu, Lord (1691–1725)
  - Nguyễn Phúc Chú, Lord (1725–1738)
  - Nguyễn Phúc Khoát, Lord (1738–1765)
  - Nguyễn Phúc Thuần, Lord (1765–1777)
  - Nguyễn Phúc Dương, Lord (1776–1777)

=== South ===
Afghanistan

- Hotak dynasty (complete list) –
  - Mirwais Hotak, Emir (1709–1715)
  - Abdul Aziz Hotak, Emir (1715–1717)
  - Mahmud Hotaki, Emir (1717–1725)
  - Ashraf Hotaki, Emir (1725–1729)
  - Hussain Hotaki, Emir (1729–1738)
- Durrani Empire (complete list) –
  - Ahmad Shah Durrani, Emir (1738–1772)
  - Timur Shah Durrani, Emir (1772–1793)
  - Zaman Shah Durrani, Emir (1793–1801)

Sri Lanka

- Dutch Ceylon (complete list) –

Colony, 1656–1796
For details see the Dutch Republic under Western Europe

=== West ===
Bahrain

- Hakims of Bahrain (complete list) –
  - Ahmed ibn Muhammad ibn Khalifa, Hakim (1783–1796)
  - Sulman ibn Ahmad Al Khalifa, Hakim (1796–1825)
  - Abdullah ibn Ahmad Al Khalifa, Hakim (1796–1843)

Cyprus

Iran

- Safavid Iran (complete list) –
  - Sultan Husayn, Shah (1694–1722)
  - Tahmasp II, Shah (1722–1732)
  - Abbas III, Shah (1732–1736)
- Persia: Afsharid dynasty (complete list) –
  - Nader Shah, Shah (1736–1747)
  - Adil Shah, Shah (1747–1748)
  - Ebrahim Afshar, Shah (1748)
  - Shahrokh Afshar, Shah (1748–1796)
- Persia: Zand dynasty (complete list) –
  - Karim Khan Zand, Shah (1751–1779)
  - Mohammad Ali Khan Zand, Shah (1779)
  - Abol-Fath Khan Zand, Shah (1779)
  - Sadeq Khan Zand, Shah (1779–1782)
  - Ali-Morad Khan Zand, Shah (1782–1785)
  - Jafar Khan, Shah (1785–1789)
  - Sayed Morad Khan, Shah (1789)
  - Lotf Ali Khan, Shah (1789–1794)
- Persia: Qajar dynasty (complete list) –
  - Agha Mohammad Khan, Shah (1789–1797)
  - Fath-Ali, Shah (1797–1834)
- Baban (complete list) –
  - Sulaiman Baba, Prince (1670–1703)
  - Khana Mohammad Pasha, Prince (1721–1731)
  - Nawaub Khalid Pasha, Prince (1732–1742)
  - Nawaub Salim Pasha, Prince (1742–1754)
  - Nawaub Sulaiman Pasha, Prince (1754–1765)
  - Muhammad Pasha, Prince (1765–1775)
  - Abdolla Pasha, Prince (1775–1777)
  - Ahmad Pasha, Prince (1777–1780)
  - Mahmoud Pasha, Prince (1780–1782)
  - Ibrahim Pasha, Prince (1782–1803)

Iraq

Israel

Jordan

Kuwait

- Sheikhdom of Kuwait (complete list) –
  - Sabah I, Sheikh (1752–1762)
  - Abdullah I, Sheikh (1762–1814)

Lebanon

Oman

- Omani Empire and Imamate of Oman: Yaruba dynasty (complete list) –
  - Saif bin Sultan, Imam (1692–1711)
  - Sultan bin Saif II, Imam (1711–1718)
  - Saif bin Sultan II, Imam (1718–1719) First reign
  - Muhanna bin Sultan, Imam (1719–1720)
  - Saif bin Sultan II, Imam (1720–1722) Second reign
  - Ya'arab bin Bel'arab, Imam (1722–1722)
  - Saif bin Sultan II, Imam (1722–1724) Third reign
  - Muhammad bin Nasir, Imam (1724–1728) Not a member of the dynasty
  - Saif bin Sultan II, Imam (1728–1742) Fourth reign; at first in the coastal area only
  - Bal'arab bin Himyar, Imam (1728–1737) First reign; in the interior
  - Sultan bin Murshid, Imam (1742–1743)
  - Bal'arab bin Himyar, Imam (1743–1749) Second reign; in the interior
- Omani Empire and Imamate of Oman: Al Busaidi dynasty (complete list) –
  - Ahmad bin Said, Sultan (1749–1783)
  - Said bin Ahmad, Sultan (1783–1784)
  - Hamad bin Said, Sultan (1784–1792)
  - Sultan bin Ahmad, Sultan (1792–1804)

Qatar

Saudi Arabia

- Bani Khalid Emirate (complete list) –
  - Sa'dun bin Muhammad, Emir (1691–1722)
  - Ali bin Muhammad, Emir (1722–1736)
  - Suleiman bin Muhammad, Emir (1736–1752)
  - Urayar bin Dajeen bin Saadoun, Emir (1752–1774)
  - Bateen Bin Urayer, Emir (1775–1793)
  - Dajeen bin Urayer, Emir (1774–1774)
  - Sa'dun bin Urayer, Emir (1774–1786)
  - Dwaihis Bin Urayer, Emir (1786–1789)
  - Muhammad Bin Urayer, Emir (1786–1789)
  - Abdul Mohsen bin Sadah, Emir (1786–1791)
  - Zaid bin Urayer, Emir (1789–1793)
  - Barak bin Abdul Mohsen Al-Sadah, Emir (1793–1796)
- Emirate of Diriyah (complete list) –
  - Muhammad bin Saud, Imam (1744–1765)
  - Abdul-Aziz bin Muhammad, Imam (1765–1803)

Syria

Turkey

- Ottoman Empire
  - Sultans –
    - Mustafa II, Sultan (1695–1703)
    - Ahmed III, Sultan (1703–1730)
    - Mahmud I, Sultan (1730–1754)
    - Osman III, Sultan (1754–1757)
    - Mustafa III, Sultan (1757–1774)
    - Abdul Hamid I, Sultan (1774–1789)
    - Selim III, Sultan (1789–1807)
  - Grand Viziers –
    - Amcazade Köprülü Hüseyin Pasha, Grand Vizier (1697–1702)
    - Daltaban Mustafa Pasha, Grand Vizier (1702–1703)
    - Rami Mehmed Pasha, Grand Vizier (1703)
    - Sührablı Kavanoz Nişancı Ahmed Pasha, Grand Vizier (1703)
    - Damat Hasan Pasha, Grand Vizier (1703–1704)
    - Kalaylıkoz Hacı Ahmed Pasha, Grand Vizier (1704)
    - Baltaji Mehmet Pasha, Grand Vizier (1704–1706)
    - Çorlulu Ali Pasha, Grand Vizier (1706–1710)
    - Köprülü Numan Pasha, Grand Vizier (1710)
    - Baltaji Mehmet Pasha, Grand Vizier (1710–1711)
    - Ağa Yusuf Pasha, Grand Vizier (1711–1712)
    - Nişancı Süleyman Pasha, Grand Vizier (1712–1713)
    - Kel Hoca Ibrahim Pasha, Grand Vizier (1713)
    - Silahdar Damat Ali Pasha, Grand Vizier (1713–1716)
    - Hacı Halil Pasha, Grand Vizier (1716–1717)
    - Tevkii Nişancı Mehmed Pasha, Grand Vizier (1717–1718)
    - Nevşehirli Damat Ibrahim Pasha, Grand Vizier (1718–1730)
    - Silahdar Damat Mehmet Pasha, Grand Vizier (1730–1731)
    - Kabakulak Ibrahim Pasha, Grand Vizier (1731)
    - Topal Osman Pasha, Grand Vizier (1731–1732)
    - Hekimoğlu Ali Pasha, Grand Vizier (1732–1735)
    - Gürcü Ismail Pasha, Grand Vizier (1735–1736)
    - Silahdar Seyyid Mehmed Pasha, Grand Vizier (1736–1737)
    - Muhsinzade Abdullah Pasha, Grand Vizier (1737)
    - Yeğen Mehmed Pasha, Grand Vizier (1737–1739)
    - Ivaz Mehmed Pasha, Grand Vizier (1739–1740)
    - Nişancı Ahmed Pasha, Grand Vizier (1740–1742)
    - Hekimoğlu Ali Pasha, Grand Vizier (1742–1743)
    - Seyyid Hasan Pasha, Grand Vizier (1743–1746)
    - Tiryaki Hacı Mehmed Pasha, Grand Vizier (1746–1747)
    - Seyyid Abdullah Pasha, Grand Vizier (1747–1750)
    - Divitdar Mehmed Emin Pasha, Grand Vizier (1750–1752)
    - Çorlulu Köse Bahir Mustafa Pasha, Grand Vizier (1752–1755)
    - Hekimoğlu Ali Pasha, Grand Vizier (1755)
    - Naili Abdullah Pasha, Grand Vizier (1755)
    - Silahdar Bıyıklı Ali Pasha, Grand Vizier (1755)
    - Yirmisekizzade Mehmed Said Pasha, Grand Vizier (1755–1756)
    - Çorlulu Köse Bahir Mustafa Pasha, Grand Vizier (1756–1757)
    - Koca Ragıp Pasha, Grand Vizier (1757–1763)
    - Tevkii Hamza Hamid Pasha, Grand Vizier (1763)
    - Çorlulu Köse Bahir Mustafa Pasha, Grand Vizier (1763–1765)
    - Muhsinzade Mehmed Pasha, Grand Vizier (1765–1768)
    - Silahdar Hamza Mahir Pasha, Grand Vizier (1768)
    - Yağlıkçızade Nişancı Hacı Mehmed Emin Pasha, Grand Vizier (1768–1769)
    - Moldovancı Ali Pasha, Grand Vizier (1769)
    - Ivazzade Halil Pasha, Grand Vizier (1769–1770)
    - Silahdar Mehmed Pasha, Grand Vizier (1770–1771)
    - Muhsinzade Mehmed Pasha, Grand Vizier (1771–1774)
    - Izzet Mehmed Pasha, Grand Vizier (1774–1775)
    - Moralı Derviş Mehmed Pasha, Grand Vizier (1775–1777)
    - Darendeli Cebecizade Mehmed Pasha, Grand Vizier (1777–1778)
    - Kalafat Mehmed Pasha, Grand Vizier (1778–1779)
    - Silahdar Karavezir Seyyid Mehmed Pasha, Grand Vizier (1779–1781)
    - Izzet Mehmed Pasha, Grand Vizier (1781–1782)
    - Yeğen Hacı Mehmed Pasha, Grand Vizier (1782)
    - Halil Hamid Pasha, Grand Vizier (1782–1785)
    - Hazinedar Şahin Ali Pasha, Grand Vizier (1785–1786)
    - Koca Yusuf Pasha, Grand Vizier (1786–1789)
    - Kethüda Meyyit Hasan Pasha, Grand Vizier (1789)
    - Hassan Pasha of Algiers, Grand Vizier (1789–1790)
    - Çelebizade Şerif Hasan Pasha, Grand Vizier (1790–1791)
    - Koca Yusuf Pasha, Grand Vizier (1791–1792)
    - Melek Mehmed Pasha, Grand Vizier (1792–1794)
    - Safranbolulu Izzet Mehmet Pasha, Grand Vizier (1794–1798)
    - Kör Yusuf Ziyaüddin Pasha, Grand Vizier (1798–1805)

United Arab Emirates

- Emirate of Abu Dhabi –
  - Dhiyab bin Isa Al Nahyan, ruler (1761–1793)
  - Shakhbut bin Dhiyab Al Nahyan, ruler (1793–1816)
- Emirate of Sharjah –
  - Rashid bin Matar Al Qasimi, ruler (1747–1777)
  - Saqr bin Rashid Al Qasimi, ruler (1777–1803)
- Umm Al Quwain –
  - Rashid bin Majid Al Mualla, ruler (1768–1820)
- Emirate of Ras Al Khaimah –
  - Rahma Al Qasimi, ruler (1708–1731)
  - Matar bin Butti Al Qasimi, ruler (1731–1747)
  - Rashid bin Matar Al Qasimi, ruler (1747–1777)
  - Saqr bin Rashid Al Qasimi, ruler (1777–1803)

Yemen

- Upper Aulaqi Sheikhdom (complete list) –
  - Daha, Amir (18th century)
  - Yaslam ibn Daha, Amir (?)
  - `Ali ibn Yaslam, Amir (?)
  - `Amm Dayb ibn `Ali al-Yaslami al-`Awlaqi, Amir (?)
- Upper Aulaqi Sultanate (complete list) –
  - Munassar, Sultan (18th century)
- Wahidi Balhaf of Ba´l Haf (complete list) –
  - al-Hadi ibn Salih al-Wahidi, Sultan (c.1670–1706)
  - al-Hasan ibn al-Hadi al-Wahidi, Sultan (1706–1766)
  - al-Husayn ibn al-Hasan al-Wahidi, Sultan (1766–1771)
  - Sa`id ibn al-Hasan al-Wahidi, Sultan (1771–1771)
  - Ahmad ibn al-Hadi al-Wahidi, Sultan (1771–1810)
- Emirate of Beihan (complete list) –
  - Hasan, Amir (?)
  - Ghalib, Amir (c.1750–1800)
  - Hussein, Amir (c.1800–1820)
- Kathiri (complete list) –
  - Badr ibn Dscha'far al-Kathir, Sultan (1690–1707)
  - 'Abdllah ibn Badr al-Kathir, Sultan (1707–1725)
  - 'Amr ibn Badr al-Kathir, Sultan (1725–1760)
  - Ahmad ibn 'Amr al-Kathir, Sultan (1760–1800)
  - Muhsin ibn Ahmad al-Kathir, Sultan (1800–1830)
- Sultanate of Lahej –
  - al-Fadl I ibn 'Ali al-Sallami al-'Abdali, Sultan (1728–1742)
  - 'Abd al-Karim I ibn al-Fadl al-'Abdali, Sultan (1742–1753)
  - 'Abd al-Hadi ibn 'Abd al-Karim al-'Abdali, Sultan (1753–1775)
  - al-Fadl II ibn 'Abd al-Karim al-'Abdali, Sultan (1775–1791)
  - Ahmad I ibn 'Abd al-Karim al-'Abdali, Sultan (1791–1827)
- Mahra Sultanate –
  - `Afrar al-Mahri, Sultan (c.1750–1780)
  - Taw`ari ibn `Afrar al-Mahri, Sultan (c.1780–1800)
- Lower Yafa –
  - Qahtan ibn Afif, ruler (1700–1720)
  - Sayf ibn Qahtan al-Afifi, ruler (1720–1740)
  - Ma`awda ibn Sayf al-Afifi, ruler (1740–1760)
  - Ghalib ibn Ma`awda al-Afifi, ruler (1760–1780)
  - Abd al-Karim ibn Ghalib al-Afifi, ruler (1780–1800)
  - Ali I ibn Ghalib al-Afifi, ruler (1800–1841)
- Upper Yafa –
  - `Ali ibn Ahmad ibn Harhara, Sheikh (c.1730–1735)
  - Ahmad ibn `Ali Al Harhara, Sheikh (c.1735–1750)
  - Salih ibn Ahmad Al Harhara, Sheikh (c.1750–1780)
  - `Umar ibn Salih Al Harhara, Sheikh (c.1780–1800)
- Yemeni Zaidi State (complete list) –
  - al-Mahdi Muhammad, Imam (1689–1718)
  - al-Mutawakkil al-Qasim, Imam (1716–1727)
  - al-Mansur al-Husayn II, Imam (1727–1748)
  - al-Mahdi Abbas, Imam (1748–1775)
  - al-Mansur Ali I, Imam (1775–1809)

== Europe ==
=== Balkans ===
Croatia

- Kingdom of Croatia (Habsburg)
  - Kings (complete list) –

part of the Habsburg monarchy, also part of the Lands of the Hungarian Crown

House of Habsburg

    - Leopold I, King (1657–1705)
    - Joseph I, King (1705–1711)
    - Charles III, King (1711–1740)
    - Maria Theresa, Queen (1740–1780)

House of Habsburg-Lorraine

    - Joseph II, King (1780–1790)
    - Leopold II, King (1790–1792)
    - Francis, King (1792–1835)
  - Bans (complete list) –
    - Adam II. Batthyány, Ban (1693–1703)
    - Ivan Pálffy, Ban (1704–1732)
    - Ivan V Drašković, Ban (1732–1733)
    - Josef Esterházy, Ban (1733–1741)
    - György Branyng, Ban (1741–1742)
    - Károly József Batthyány, Ban (1743–1756)
    - Ferenc Nádasdy, Ban (1756–1783)
    - Ferenc Esterházy, Ban (1783–1785)
    - Ferenc Balassa, Ban (1785–1790)
    - Ivan Erdődy, Ban (1790–1806)
- Republic of Ragusa (complete list) –
  - Vlaho Gozze, Rector (1702)
  - Džono Gozze, Rector (1703)
  - Đivo Menze, Rector (1706)
  - Frano Tudisi, Rector (1707)
  - Džono Gozze, Rector (1708)
  - Đivo Menze, Rector (1709)
  - Luko Marina Sorga, Rector (1710)
  - Đivo Gozze, Rector (1726)
  - Đivo Basilio, Rector (1727)
  - Vlađ Sorgo, Rector (1728)
  - Đivo Gozze, Rector (1729)
  - Giunio Resti, Rector (1730)
  - Vlaho Menze, Rector (1752)
  - Jako Basilio, Rector (1754)
  - Đivo Bucchia, Rector (1755)
  - Marin Brna Caboge, Rector (1756)
  - Niko Gozze, Rector (1757)
  - Baldo Bucchia, Rector (1758)
  - Orsat Cerva, Rector (1759)
  - Đivo Sorgo, Rector (1761)
  - Mato Zamagna, Rector (1762)
  - Miho Zamagna, Baldo Gozze, Rector (1763)
  - Niko Proculo, Rector (1764)
  - Luko Giorgi, Rector (1765)
  - Zamagna, Rector (1766–?)
  - Antun Resti, Rector (1767)
  - Sabo Giorgi, Rector (1768)
  - Saro Sorgo, Rector (1769)
  - Marin Boža Sarace, Đivo Rafa Gozze, Rector (1770)
  - Niko Proculo, Rector (1773)
  - Lukša Giorgi-Bona, Rector (1774)
  - Martolica Bosdari, Rector (1775)
  - Luko Zamagna, Rector (1776)
  - Baldo Gozze, Rector (1777)
  - Miho Lukše Bone, Klement Vlaha Menze, Rector (1796)
  - Marin Giorgi, Rector (1797)
  - Đivo Basilio, Klement Menze, Antun Marina Caboge, Mato Zamagna, Rector (1798)
  - Rafo Gozze, Marin Bona, Rector (1800)

Greece

- Septinsular Republic –
  - Spyridon Georgios Theotokis, Prince (1800–1803)

Montenegro

- Prince-Bishopric of Montenegro (complete list) –
  - Danilo I, Prince-bishop (1696–1735)
  - Sava II, Prince-bishop (1735–1782)
  - Vasilije III, Prince-bishop (1750–1766)
  - Šćepan Mali, Prince-bishop (1768–1773)
  - Petar I, Prince-bishop (1782–1830)

=== British Isles ===
Great Britain and Ireland

- Kingdom of England, Kingdom of Scotland, Kingdom of Ireland (complete list, complete list) –
  - William III & II, King (1689–1702)
  - Anne, Queen (1702–1714)
- Kingdom of Great Britain, Kingdom of Ireland
  - Monarchs (complete list) –
    - Anne, Queen (1702–1714)
    - George I, King (1714–1727)
    - George II, King (1727–1760)
    - George III, King (1760–1820)
  - Prime ministers (complete list) –
    - Robert Walpole, Prime minister (1721–1742)
    - Spencer Compton, Prime minister (1742–1743)
    - Henry Pelham, Prime minister (1743–1754)
    - Thomas Pelham-Holles, Prime minister (1754–1756)
    - William Cavendish, Prime minister (1756–1757)
    - Thomas Pelham-Holles, Prime minister (1757–1762)
    - John Stuart, Prime minister (1762–1763)
    - George Grenville, Prime minister (1763–1765)
    - Charles Watson-Wentworth, Prime minister (1765–1766)
    - William Pitt the Elder, Prime minister (1766–1768)
    - Augustus FitzRoy, Prime minister (1768–1770)
    - Frederick North, Prime minister (1770–1782)
    - Charles Watson-Wentworth, Prime minister (1782)
    - William Petty, Prime minister (1782–1783)
    - William Cavendish-Bentinck, Prime minister (1783)
    - William Pitt the Younger, Prime minister (1783–1801)

=== Central ===
- Holy Roman Empire, Kingdom of Germany
  - Emperors Elect, Kings –
    - Leopold I, Emperor Elect, King (1658–1705)
    - Joseph I, Emperor Elect (1705–1711), King (1690–1711)
    - Charles VI, Emperor Elect, King (1711–1740)
    - Charles VII, Emperor Elect, King (1742–1745)
    - Francis I, Emperor Elect (1745–1765), King (1745–1764)
    - Joseph II, Emperor Elect (1765–1790), King (1764–1790)
    - Leopold II, Emperor Elect, King (1790–1792)
    - Francis II, Emperor Elect, King (1792–1806)
  - Reichsvizekanzler: Vice Chancellor –
    - Dominik Andreas I. von Kaunitz, Vice Chancellor (1698–1705)
    - Friedrich Karl von Schönborn-Buchheim, Vice Chancellor (1705–1734)
    - Johann Adolf Graf von Metsch, Vice Chancellor (1734–1740)
    - Johann Georg Graf von Königsfeld, Vice Chancellor (1742–1745)
    - Rudolph Joseph von Colloredo, Vice Chancellor (1745–1788)
    - Franz de Paula Gundaker von Colloredo, Vice Chancellor (1789–1806)

Austria

- Habsburg monarchy (complete list) –

Habsburg monarchs ruled under numerous simultaneous titles

  - Leopold I, (1657–1705)
  - Joseph I, (1705–1711)
  - Charles VI, (1711–1740)
  - Maria Theresa, (1740–1780)

Habsburg-Lorraine monarchs ruled under numerous simultaneous titles

  - Joseph II, (1780–1790)
  - Leopold II, (1790–1792)
  - Francis II, (1792–1835)

Bohemia

- Kingdom of Bohemia (complete list) –
  - Leopold I, King (1656–1705)
  - Joseph I, King (1705–1711)
  - Charles III, King (1711–1740)
  - Maria Theresa, Queen (1740–1780)
  - Charles VII, anti-King (1741–1743)
  - Joseph II, King (1780–1790)
  - Leopold II, King (1790–1792)
  - Francis, King (1792–1835)

Hungary

- Kingdom of Hungary (1526–1867) (complete list) –
  - Leopold I, King (1655–1705)
  - Joseph I, King (1687–1711)
  - Charles III, King (1711–1740)
  - Maria Theresa, Queen (1740–1780)
  - Joseph II, King (1780–1790)
  - Leopold II, King (1790–1792)
  - Francis, King (1792–1835)

Poland

- Polish–Lithuanian Commonwealth: Kingdom of Poland (complete list) –
  - Augustus II the Strong, King and Grand Duke (1697–1706, 1709–1733)
  - Stanisław I, King and Grand Duke (1704–1709, 1733–1736)
  - August III the Saxon, King and Grand Duke (1733–1763)
  - Stanisław II August, King and Grand Duke (1764–1795)
- Duchy/ Kingdom of Prussia, Electorate of Brandenburg (complete list, complete list) –
  - Frederick I, Duke (1688–1701), and King of Prussia (1701–1713), Elector of Brandenburg (1688–1713)
  - Frederick William I, King, Elector (1713–1740)
  - Frederick II the Great, King, Elector (1740–1786)
  - Frederick William II, King, Elector (1786–1797)
  - Frederick William III, King (1797–1840), Elector (1797–1806)

=== East ===
- Crimean Khanate (complete list) –
  - Devlet II Giray, Khan (1699–1702)
  - Selim I Giray, Khan (1702–1704)
  - Ğazı III Giray, Khan (1704–1707)
  - Qaplan I Giray, Khan (1707–1708)
  - Devlet II Giray, Khan (1709–1713)
  - Qaplan I Giray, Khan (1713–1715)
  - Devlet III Giray, Khan (1716–1717)
  - Saadet IV Giray, Khan (1717–1724)
  - Meñli II Giray, Khan (1724–1730)
  - Qaplan I Giray, Khan (1730–1736)
  - Fetih II Giray, Khan (1736–1737)
  - Meñli II Giray, Khan (1737–1740)
  - Selamet II Giray, Khan (1740–1743)
  - Selim II Giray, Khan (1743–1748)
  - Arslan Giray, Khan (1748–1756)
  - Halim Giray, Khan (1756–1758)
  - Qırım Giray, Khan (1758–1764)
  - Selim III Giray, Khan (1765–1767)
  - Arslan Giray, Khan (1767)
  - Maqsud Giray, Khan (1767–1768)
  - Qırım Giray, Khan (1768–1769)
  - Devlet IV Giray, Khan (1769–1770)
  - Qaplan II Giray, Khan (1770)
  - Selim III Giray, Khan (1770–1771)
  - Sahib II Giray, Khan (1771–1775)
  - Devlet IV Giray, Khan (1775–1777)
  - Şahin Giray, Khan (1777–1782)
  - Bahadır II Giray, Khan (1782)
  - Şahin Giray, Khan (1782–1783)
- Polish–Lithuanian Commonwealth: Grand Duchy of Lithuania (complete list) –
  - Augustus II the Strong, King and Grand Duke (1697–1706, 1709–1733)
  - Stanisław I, King and Grand Duke (1704–1709, 1733–1736)
  - August III the Saxon, King and Grand Duke (1733–1763)
  - Stanisław II August, King and Grand Duke (1764–1795)
- Moldavia (complete list) –
  - Constantin Duca, Voivode (1693–1695, 1700–1703)
  - Ioan Buhuș, Chancellor (1703, 1709–1710)
  - Mihail III Racoviță, Prince (1703–1705, 1707–1709, 1715–1726)
  - Antioh Cantemir, Prince (1695–1700, 1705–1707)
  - Dimitrie Cantemir, Voivode (1693, 1710–1711)
  - Nicolae Mavrocordat, Prince (1709–1710, 1711–1715)
  - Lupu Costachi, Kaymakam (1711)
  - Ioan Ι Mavrocordat, Prince (1711)
  - Grigore II Ghica, Prince (1726–1733, 1735–1739, 1739–1741, 1747–1748)
  - Constantin Mavrocordat, Prince (1733–1735, 1741–1743, 1748–1749, 1769)
  - Russian occupation (1739)
  - Ioan II Mavrocordat, Prince (1743–1747)
  - Iordache Stavrachi, Prince (1749)
  - Constantin Racoviță, Prince (1749–1753, 1756–1757)
  - Matei Ghica, Prince (1753–1756)
  - Scarlat Ghica, Prince (1757–1758)
  - Ioan Teodor Callimachi, Prince (1758–1761)
  - Grigore Callimachi, Prince (1761–1764, 1767–1769)
  - Grigore III Ghica, Prince (1764–1767, 1774–1777)
  - Russian occupation (1769–1774)
  - Constantin Moruzi, Prince (1777–1782)
  - Alexander Mavrocordatos Delibey, Prince (1782–1785)
  - Alexander Mavrocordatos Firaris, Prince (1785–1786)
  - Alexander Ypsilantis, Prince (1786–1788)
  - Prince Josias of Saxe-Coburg, military commander of Austrian occupation (1787–1791)
  - Emanuel Giani Ruset, Prince (1788–1789)
  - Russian occupation (1788–1791)
  - Alexandru Moruzi, Prince (1792, 1802, 1806–1807)
  - Mihai Suțu, Prince (1793–1795)
  - Alexandru Callimachi, Prince (1795–1799)
  - Constantin Ipsilanti, Prince (1799–1801)
- Tsardom of Russia (complete list) –
  - Peter I, Tsar (1682–1721), Emperor (1721–1725)
- Russian Empire (complete list) –
  - Peter I, Tsar (1682–1721), Emperor (1721–1725)
  - Catherine I, Empress (1725–1727)
  - Peter II, Emperor (1727–1730)
  - Anna, Empress (1730–1740)
  - Ivan VI, Emperor (1740–1741)
  - Elizabeth, Empress (1741–1762)
  - Peter III, Emperor (1762)
  - Catherine II, Empress (1762–1796)
  - Paul, Emperor (1796–1801)
- Principality of Transylvania (1570–1711) (complete list) –
  - Michael II Apafi, Prince (1690–1696/1701)
  - Francis II Rákóczi, Prince (1704–1711)
- Principality of Wallachia (complete list) –
  - Constantin II Brâncoveanu, Prince (1688–1714)
  - Ștefan II Cantacuzino, Prince (1714–1715)
  - Phanariote rule (1715–1821)
  - Nicolae Mavrocordat, Prince (1715–1716, 1719–1730)
  - Habsburg occupation (1716)
  - Ioan Mavrocordat, Prince (1716–1719)
  - Constantin Mavrocordat, Prince (1730, 1731–1733, 1735–1741, 1744–1748, 1756–1758, 761–1763)
  - Mihai Racoviță, Prince (1730–1731, 1741–1744)
  - Grigore II Ghica, Prince (1733–1735, 1748–1752)
  - Matei Ghica, Prince (1752–1753)
  - Constantin Racoviță, Prince (1753–1756, 1763–1764)
  - Scarlat Ghica, Prince (1758–1761, 1765–1766)
  - Ștefan Racoviță, Prince (1764–1765)
  - Alexandru I Ghica, Prince (1766–1768)
  - Russian occupation (1768)
  - Grigore III Ghica, Prince (1768–1769)
  - Russian occupation (1769–1770)
  - Emanuel Giani Ruset, Prince (1770–1771)
  - Alexander Ypsilantis, Prince (1774–1782, 1796–1797)
  - Nicolae Caragea, Prince (1782–1783)
  - Mihai Suțu, Prince (1783–1786, 1791–1793, 1801–1802)
  - Nicolae Mavrogheni, Prince (1786–1789)
  - Prince Josias of Saxe-Coburg, military commander (1789–1790)
  - Alexandru Moruzi, Prince (1793–1796, 1799–1801)
  - Constantin Hangerli, Prince (1797–1799)

Ukraine

- Kingdom of Galicia and Lodomeria (complete list) –

1772–1795, crownland of the Habsburg monarchy

  - Maria Theresa, Queen (1772–1780)
  - Joseph II, King (1780–1790)
  - Leopold II, King (1790–1792)

1795–1804, kingdom of the Habsburg monarchy

  - Leopold II, King (1790–1792)
  - Francis II, King (1792–1835)

=== Nordic ===
Denmark–Norway

- Denmark–Norway (complete list, complete list) –
  - Frederick IV, King (1699–1730)
  - Christian VI, King (1730–1746)
  - Frederick V, King (1746–1766)
  - Christian VII, King (1766–1808)
- Duchy of Schleswig (complete list) –
  - Frederick IV, Duke of Holstein-Gottorp, Duke (1695–1702)
  - Frederick IV of Denmark, Duke (1699–1730)
  - Charles Frederick, Duke of Holstein-Gottorp, Duke (1702–1713)
  - Christian VI, Duke (1730–1746)
  - Frederick V, Duke (1746–1766)
  - Christian VII, Duke (1766–1808)

Sweden

- Swedish Empire (complete list) –
  - Charles XII, King (1697–1718)
- Sweden: Age of Liberty, Gustavian era (complete list) –
  - Ulrika Eleonora, Queen Regnant (1718–1720)
  - Frederick I, King (1720–1751)
  - Adolf Frederick, King (1751–1771)
  - Gustav III, King (1771–1792)
  - Gustav IV Adolf, King (1792–1809)

=== Southcentral ===
Italy: Holy Roman Empire

- Cisalpine Republic (complete list) –

Sister Republic of the French First Republic, 1797–1802
For details see France under western Europe

  - Francesco Melzi d'Eril, Pietro Verri, Giuseppe Parini, Alessandro Volta, Directory (1797–1799)
- Ligurian Republic –
  - Girolamo Luigi Durazzo, Doge (1797–1805)
  - (complete list) –

client republic of France, 1797–1805
For details see France under western Europe

- Duchy of Mantua (complete list) –
  - Ferdinando Carlo, Duke (1665–1708)
- Duchy of Massa and Principality of Carrara (complete list) –
  - Carlo II Cybo-Malaspina, Duke and Prince (1690–1710)
  - Alberico III Cybo-Malaspina, Duke and Prince (1710–1715)
  - Alderamo Cybo-Malaspina, Duke and Prince (1715–1731)
  - Maria Teresa Cybo-Malaspina, Duke and Prince (1731–1790)
  - Maria Beatrice, Duchess and Princess (1790–1796, 1815–1829)
- Duchy of Montferrat (complete list) –
  - Ferdinand Charles, Duke (1665–1708)
- Kingdom of Sardinia (complete list) –
  - Victor Amadeus II, King (1720–1730)
  - Charles Emmanuel III, King (1730–1773)
  - Victor Amadeus III, King (1773–1796)
  - Charles Emmanuel IV, King (1796–1802)
- Papal States (complete list) –
  - Innocent XII, Pope (1691–1700)
  - Clement XI, Pope (1700–1721)
  - Innocent XIII, Pope (1721–1724)
  - Benedict XIII, Pope (1724–1730)
  - Clement XII, Pope (1730–1740)
  - Benedict XIV, Pope (1740–1758)
  - Clement XIII, Pope (1758–1769)
  - Clement XIV, Pope (1769–1774)
  - Pius VI, Pope (1775–1799)
  - Pius VII, Pope (1800–1823)
- Duchy of Parma (complete list) –
  - Francesco, Duke (1694–1727)
  - Antonio, Duke (1727–1731)
  - Charles I, Duke (1731–1735)
  - Charles II, Duke (1735–1740)
  - Maria Theresa, Duke (1740–1748)
  - Philip, Duke (1748–1765)
  - Ferdinand, Duke (1765–1802)
- San Marino
  - Captains Regent (1700–1900) –
    - Ottavio Leonardelli, Marino Beni, Captains Regent (1700–1701)
    - Alfonso Tosini, Francesco Moracci, Captains Regent (1701)
    - Giuliano Belluzzi, Lorenzo Giangi, Captains Regent (1701–1702)
    - Giuseppe Loli, Melchiorre Martelli, Captains Regent (1702)
    - Giovanni Antonio Belluzzi, Gaspare Calbini, Captains Regent (1702–1703)
    - Bernardino Leonardelli, Giovanni Antonio Fattori, Captains Regent (1703)
    - Onofrio Onofri, Baldassarre Tini, Captains Regent (1703–1704)
    - Ottavio Leonardelli, Pietro Francini, Captains Regent (1704)
    - Giambattista Tosini, Tommaso Ceccoli, Captains Regent (1704–1705)
    - Gian Giacomo Angeli, Lorenzo Giangi, Captains Regent (1705)
    - Giuseppe Loli, Melchiorre Martelli, Captains Regent (1705–1706)
    - Giovanni Cionini, Gaspare Calbini, Captains Regent (1706)
    - Francesco Maccioni, Giambattista Ceccoli, Captains Regent (1706–1707)
    - Onofrio Onofri, Giuseppe Zampini, Captains Regent (1707)
    - Federico Gozi, Francesco Moracci, Captains Regent (1707–1708)
    - Giuliano Belluzzi, Tommaso Ceccoli, Captains Regent (1708)
    - Marino Enea Bonelli, Baldassarre Tini, Captains Regent (1708–1709)
    - Gian Giacomo Angeli, Francesco Giangi, Captains Regent (1709)
    - Giovanni Antonio Belluzzi, Giovanni Antonio Fattori, Captains Regent (1709–1710)
    - Giovanni Cionini, Melchiorre Martelli, Captains Regent (1710)
    - Francesco Maccioni, Pietro Francini, Captains Regent (1710–1711)
    - Giuseppe Loli, Girolamo Martelli, Captains Regent (1711)
    - Federico Gozi, Giuseppe Zampini, Captains Regent (1711–1712)
    - Onofrio Onofri, Giovanni Martelli, Captains Regent (1712)
    - Gian Giacomo Angeli, Bartolomeo Bedetti, Captains Regent (1712–1713)
    - Giovanni Antonio Belluzzi, Giovanni Antonio Fattori, Captains Regent (1713)
    - Giuliano Belluzzi, Tommaso Ceccoli, Captains Regent (1713–1714)
    - Giuseppe Onofri, Lorenzo Giangi, Captains Regent (1714)
    - Giuseppe Loli, Pietro Francini, Captains Regent (1714–1715)
    - Giovanni Paolo Valloni, Giuseppe Zampini, Captains Regent (1715)
    - Bernardino Leonardelli, Marino Enea Bonelli, Captains Regent (1715–1716)
    - Gian Giacomo Angeli, Giovanni Martelli, Captains Regent (1716)
    - Francesco Maria Belluzzi, Bartolomeo Bedetti, Captains Regent (1716–1717)
    - Federico Gozi, Girolamo Martelli, Captains Regent (1717)
    - Ottavio Leonardelli, Francesco Giangi, Captains Regent (1717–1718)
    - Giuliano Belluzzi, Marino Beni, Captains Regent (1718)
    - Tranquillo Manenti Belluzzi, Tommaso Ceccoli, Captains Regent (1718–1719)
    - Giovanni Paolo Valloni, Baldassarre Tini/ Francesco Moracci, Captains Regent (1719)
    - Gian Giacomo Angeli, Lorenzo Giangi, Captains Regent (1719–1720)
    - Benedetto Belluzzi, Giovanni Martelli, Captains Regent (1720)
    - Marino Enea Bonelli, Bartolomeo Bedetti, Captains Regent (1720–1721)
    - Federico Gozi, Girolamo Martelli, Captains Regent (1721)
    - Bernardino Leonardelli, Francesco Giangi, Captains Regent (1721–1722)
    - Francesco Maria Belluzzi, Marino Beni, Captains Regent (1722)
    - Valerio Maccioni, Pier Antonio Ugolini, Captains Regent (1722–1723)
    - Giuseppe Onofri, Tommaso Ceccoli, Captains Regent (1723)
    - Pietro Loli, Giovanni Martelli, Captains Regent (1723–1724)
    - Giovanni Paolo Valloni, Biagio Antonio Martelli, Captains Regent (1724)
    - Marino Enea Bonelli, Bartolomeo Bedetti, Captains Regent (1724–1725)
    - Gian Giacomo Angeli, Lorenzo Giangi, Captains Regent (1725)
    - Federico Gozi, Marino Beni, Captains Regent (1725–1726)
    - Tranquillo Manenti Belluzzi, Girolamo Martelli, Captains Regent (1726)
    - Valerio Maccioni, Pier Antonio Ugolini, Captains Regent (1726–1727)
    - Giuseppe Onofri, Tommaso Ceccoli, Captains Regent (1727)
    - Gentile Maria Maggio, Giovanni Martelli, Captains Regent (1727–1728)
    - Francesco Maria Belluzzi, Biagio Antonio Martelli, Captains Regent (1728)
    - Marino Enea Bonelli, Bernardino Capicchioni, Captains Regent (1728–1729)
    - Giovanni Paolo Valloni, Francesco Giangi, Captains Regent (1729)
    - Gian Giacomo Angeli, Giovanni Andrea Beni, Captains Regent (1729–1730)
    - Valerio Maccioni, Pier Antonio Ugolini, Captains Regent (1730)
    - Tranquillo Manenti Belluzzi, Girolamo Martelli, Captains Regent (1730–1731)
    - Giuseppe Onofri, Lodovico Anatucci, Captains Regent (1731)
    - Giovanni Antonio Leonardelli, Bartolomeo Bedetti, Captains Regent (1731–1732)
    - Giovanni Benedetto Belluzzi, Giovanni Martelli, Captains Regent (1732)
    - Valerio Maccioni, Vincenzo Moracci, Captains Regent (1732–1733)
    - Francesco Maria Belluzzi, Giovanni Maria Giangi, Captains Regent (1733)
    - Giovanni Paolo Valloni, Giovanni Maria Beni, Captains Regent (1733–1734)
    - Marino Enea Bonelli, Tommaso Capicchioni, Captains Regent (1734)
    - Giuseppe Onofri, Lodovico Anatucci, Captains Regent (1734–1735)
    - Tranquillo Manenti Belluzzi, Biagio Antonio Martelli, Captains Regent (1735)
    - Federico Tosini, Pier Antonio Ugolini, Captains Regent (1735–1736)
    - Gian Giacomo Angeli, Girolamo Martelli, Captains Regent (1736)
    - Francesco Maria Belluzzi, Giovanni Maria Giangi, Captains Regent (1736–1737)
    - Valerio Maccioni, Vincenzo Moracci, Captains Regent (1737)
    - Filippo Manenti Belluzzi, Giuliano Malpeli, Captains Regent (1737–1738)
    - Giuseppe Onofri, Giovanni Maria Beni, Captains Regent (1738)
    - Giovanni Antonio Leonardelli, Giovanni Martelli, Captains Regent (1738–1739)
    - Giovanni Benedetto Belluzzi, Biagio Antonio Martelli, Captains Regent (1739)
    - Gian Giacomo Angeli, Alfonso Giangi, Captains Regent (1739–1740)
    - Gaspare Fogli, Gonfalonier (1739), during Cardinal Giulio Alberoni's invasion
    - Marino Enea Bonelli, Alfonso Giangi, Captains Regent (1740)
    - Giuseppe Onofri, Vincenzo Moracci, Captains Regent (1740–1741)
    - Giovanni Maria Giangi, Marino Tini, Captains Regent (1741)
    - Lodovico Belluzzi, Pier Antonio Ugolini, Captains Regent (1741–1742)
    - Girolamo Gozi, Giovanni Martelli, Captains Regent (1742)
    - Biagio Antonio Martelli, Domenico Bertoni, Captains Regent (1742–1743)
    - Filippo Manenti Belluzzi, Filippo Fabbrini, Captains Regent (1743)
    - Giacomo Begni, Francesco Antonio Righi, Captains Regent (1743–1744)
    - Giuseppe Onofri, Alfonso Giangi, Captains Regent (1744)
    - Giovanni Maria Giangi, Vincenzo Moracci, Captains Regent (1744–1745)
    - Giambattista Zampini, Pompeo Zoli, Captains Regent (1745)
    - Girolamo Gozi, Tommaso Capicchioni, Captains Regent (1745–1746)
    - Lodovico Belluzzi, Marc' Antonio Tassini, Captains Regent (1746)
    - Filippo Manenti Belluzzi, Domenico Bertoni, Captains Regent (1746–1747)
    - Giacomo Begni, Ottavio Fazzini, Captains Regent (1747)
    - Biagio Antonio Martelli, Giovanni Martelli, Captains Regent (1747–1748)
    - Giovanni Marino Giangi, Francesco Antonio Righi, Captains Regent (1748)
    - Costantino Bonelli, Pompeo Zoli, Captains Regent (1748–1749)
    - Giuseppe Onofri, Vincenzo Moracci, Captains Regent (1749)
    - Lodovico Belluzzi, Marc' Antonio Tassini, Captains Regent (1749–1750)
    - Filippo Manenti Belluzzi, Pier Antonio Ugolini, Captains Regent (1750)
    - Giovanni Antonio Leonardelli, Alfonso Giangi, Captains Regent (1750–1751)
    - Aurelio Valloni, Filippo Fabbrini, Captains Regent (1751)
    - Giovanni Maria Giangi, Marino Tini, Captains Regent (1751–1752)
    - Giacomo Begni, Pompeo Zoli, Captains Regent (1752)
    - Costantino Bonelli, Giovanni Martelli, Captains Regent (1752–1753)
    - Giuseppe Onofri, Giuseppe Franzoni, Captains Regent (1753)
    - Filippo Manenti Belluzzi, Marc' Antonio Tassini, Captains Regent (1753–1754)
    - Girolamo Gozi, Vincenzo Moracci, Captains Regent (1754)
    - Francesco Maccioni, Ottavio Fazzini, Captains Regent (1754–1755)
    - Biagio Antonio Martelli, Giuseppe Bertoni, Captains Regent (1755)
    - Giacomo Begni, Paolo Tini, Captains Regent (1755–1756)
    - Marino Belluzzi, Francesco Casali, Captains Regent (1756)
    - Giovanni Beni, Francesco Antonio Righi, Captains Regent (1756–1757)
    - Giambattista Angeli, Marc' Antonio Tassini, Captains Regent (1757)
    - Filippo Manenti Belluzzi, Antonio Capicchioni, Captains Regent (1757–1758)
    - Lodovico Belluzzi, Marino Tini, Captains Regent (1758)
    - Giovanni Maria Giangi, Giuseppe Franzoni, Captains Regent (1758–1759)
    - Giacomo Begni, Pompeo Zoli, Captains Regent (1759)
    - Giovanni Antonio Leonardelli, Filippo Fazzini, Captains Regent (1759–1760)
    - Aurelio Valloni, Francesco Antonio Righi, Captains Regent (1760)
    - Giambattista Angeli, Giovanni Pietro Martelli, Captains Regent (1760–1761)
    - Francesco Maccioni, Marino Martelli, Captains Regent (1761)
    - Filippo Manenti, Marc' Antonio Tassini, Captains Regent (1761–1762)
    - Giovanni Maria Giangi, Giuseppe Bertoni, Captains Regent (1762)
    - Giambattista Zampini, Pompeo Zoli, Captains Regent (1762–1763)
    - Giambattista Bonelli, Filippo Fazzini, Captains Regent (1763)
    - Girolamo Gozi, Paolo Tini, Captains Regent (1763–1764)
    - Giambattista Angeli, Antonio Capicchioni, Captains Regent (1764)
    - Giovanni Antonio Leonardelli, Marino Martelli, Captains Regent (1764–1765)
    - Filippo Manenti, Marc' Antonio Tassini, Captains Regent (1765)
    - Francesco Begni, Francesco Benedetti, Captains Regent (1765–1766)
    - Filippo Belluzzi, Pompeo Zoli, Captains Regent (1766)
    - Giuseppe Giannini, Giuseppe Franzoni, Captains Regent (1766–1767)
    - Francesco Maccioni, Filippo Fazzini, Captains Regent (1767)
    - Giambattista Angeli, Giuseppe Bertoni, Captains Regent (1767–1768)
    - Giuliano Gozi, Francesco Casali, Captains Regent (1768)
    - Costantino Bonelli, Giovanni Antonio Malpeli, Captains Regent (1768–1769)
    - Baldassarre Giangi, Marc' Antonio Tassini, Captains Regent (1769)
    - Filippo Manenti, Francesco Antonio Casali, Captains Regent (1769–1770)
    - Gaetano Belluzzi, Pompeo Zoli, Captains Regent (1770)
    - Giuseppe Giannini, Antonio Capicchioni, Captains Regent (1770–1771)
    - Giambattista Angeli, Filippo Fazzini, Captains Regent (1771)
    - Giuliano Gozi, Angelo Ortolani, Captains Regent (1771–1772)
    - Sebastiano Onofri, Giuseppe Bertoni, Captains Regent (1772)
    - Baldassarre Giangi, Francesco di Livio Casali, Captains Regent (1772–1773)
    - Costantino Bonelli, Giovanni Antonio Malpeli, Captains Regent (1773)
    - Francesco Manenti, Pompeo Zoli, Captains Regent (1773–1774)
    - Gaetano Belluzzi, Antonio Capicchioni, Captains Regent (1774)
    - Giuliano Belluzzi, Francesco Antonio Casali, Captains Regent (1774–1775)
    - Giuliano Gozi, Angelo Ortolani, Captains Regent (1775)
    - Giambattista Angeli, Girolamo Paoloni, Captains Regent (1775–1776)
    - Giuseppe Giannini, Antimo Meloni, Captains Regent (1776)
    - Francesco Onofri, Francesco di Livio Casali, Captains Regent (1776–1777)
    - Costantino Bonelli, Francesco Moracci, Captains Regent (1777)
    - Pier Antonio Leonardelli, Giovanni Antonio Malpeli, Captains Regent (1777–1778)
    - Baldassarre Giangi, Francesco Antonio Casali/ Alessandro Martelli, Captains Regent (1778)
    - Giambattista Bonelli, Pier Francesco Meloni, Captains Regent (1778–1779)
    - Giuliano Gozi, Angelo Ortolani, Captains Regent (1779)
    - Filippo Belluzzi, Pompeo Zoli, Captains Regent (1779–1780)
    - Francesco Manenti, Antonio Capicchioni, Captains Regent (1780)
    - Costantino Bonelli, Francesco di Livio Casali, Captains Regent (1780–1781)
    - Pier Antonio Leonardelli, Girolamo Paoloni, Captains Regent (1781)
    - Baldassarre Giangi, Giovanni Antonio Malpeli, Captains Regent (1781–1782)
    - Giambattista Bonelli, Antimo Meloni, Captains Regent (1782)
    - Giuseppe Giannini, Francesco Malpeli, Captains Regent (1782–1783)
    - Francesco Begni, Pompeo Zoli, Captains Regent (1783)
    - Giuliano Gozi, Pier Francesco Vita, Captains Regent (1783–1784)
    - Giambattista Zampini, Angelo Ortolani, Captains Regent (1784)
    - Francesco Manenti, Marino Francesconi, Captains Regent (1784–1785)
    - Marino Giangi, Giovanni Antonio Malpeli, Captains Regent (1785)
    - Pier Antonio Leonardelli, Girolamo Paoloni, Captains Regent (1785–1786)
    - Giambattista Bonelli, Matteo Martelli, Captains Regent (1786)
    - Giuliano Gozi, Francesco Faetani, Captains Regent (1786–1787)
    - Giuliano Gozi, Francesco Faetani, Captains Regent (1787)
    - Francesco Onofri, Francesco Tini, Captains Regent (1787–1788)
    - Giambattista Bonelli, Giovanni Filippi, Captains Regent (1788)
    - Francesco Begni, Filippo Fazzini, Captains Regent (1788–1789)
    - Giuliano Belluzzi, Silvestro Masi, Captains Regent (1789)
    - Marino Giangi, Francesco Belzoppi, Captains Regent (1789–1790)
    - Mariano Begni, Matteo Martelli, Captains Regent (1790)
    - Filippo Belluzzi, Antonio Capicchioni, Captains Regent (1790–1791)
    - Francesco Giannini, Antimo Meloni, Captains Regent (1791)
    - Antonio Onofri, Girolamo Paoloni, Captains Regent (1791–1792)
    - Giuliano Gozi, Giovanni Filippi, Captains Regent (1792)
    - Giambattista Bonelli, Marino Francesconi, Captains Regent (1792–1793)
    - Giuliano Belluzzi, Marino Tassini, Captains Regent (1793)
    - Marino Giangi, Felice Caroti, Captains Regent (1793–1794)
    - Marino Begni, Antonio Capicchioni, Captains Regent (1794)
    - Filippo Belluzzi, Pier Vincenzo Giannini, Captains Regent (1794–1795)
    - Giuseppe Mercuri, Angelo Ortolani, Captains Regent (1795)
    - Francesco Giannini, Livio Casali, Captains Regent (1795–1796)
    - Giuliano Gozi, Matteo Martelli, Captains Regent (1796)
    - Antonio Onofri, Marino Francesconi, Captains Regent (1796–1797)
    - Giuliano Belluzzi, Girolamo Paoloni, Captains Regent (1797)
    - Annibale Gozi, Antonio Capicchioni, Captains Regent (1797–1798)
    - Marino Begni, Alessandro Righi, Captains Regent (1798)
    - Marino Giangi, Vincenzo Belzoppi, Captains Regent (1798–1799)
    - Francesco Giannini, Pietro Zoli, Captains Regent (1799)
    - Camillo Bonelli, Livio Casali, Captains Regent (1799–1800)
    - Francesco Faetani, Matteo Martelli, Captains Regent (1800)
    - Giuseppe Mercuri, Pier Vincenzo Giannini, Captains Regent (1800–1801)
Grand Duchy of Tuscany (complete list) –
- Cosimo III, Grand Duke (1670–1723)
- Gian Gastone, Grand Duke (1723–1737)
- Francesco Stefano, Grand Duke (1737–1765)
- Leopoldo I, Grand Duke (1765–1790)
- Ferdinando III, Grand Duke (1790–1801, 1814–1824)
Republic of Venice (complete list) –
- Alvise II Mocenigo, Doge (1700–1709)
- Giovanni II Cornaro, Doge (1709–1722)
- Sebastiano Mocenigo, Doge (1722–1732)
- Carlo Ruzzini, Doge (1732–1735)
- Alvise Pisani, Doge (1735–1741)
- Pietro Grimani, Doge (1741–1752)
- Francesco Loredan, Doge (1752–1762)
- Marco Foscarini, Doge (1762–1763)
- Alvise Giovanni Mocenigo, Doge (1763–1779)
- Paolo Renier, Doge (1779–1789)
- Ludovico Manin, Doge (1789–1797)

Italy: Southern

- Kingdom of Naples (complete list) –
  - Philip IV, King (1700–1713)
  - Charles VI, King (1713–1734/35)
  - Charles VII, King (1734–1759)
  - Ferdinand IV, King (1759–1799)
  - Jean Étienne Championnet, Military Dictator (1799)
  - Jacques MacDonald, Military Dictator (1799)
  - Ferdinand IV, King (1799–1806)
- Kingdom of Trinacria: Sicily (complete list) –
  - Philip V, King (1700–1713)
  - Victor Amadeus, King (1713–1720)
  - Charles IV, King (1720–1735)
  - Charles V, King (1735–1759)
  - Ferdinand IV, King of Sicily (1759–1816), of Naples (1815–1816), of the Two Sicilies (1816–1825)

Malta

- Hospitaller Malta (complete list) –
  - Ramón Perellós, Grand Master (1697–1720)
  - Marc'Antonio Zondadari, Grand Master (1720–1722)
  - António Manoel de Vilhena, Grand Master (1722–1736)
  - Ramón Despuig, Grand Master (1736–1741)
  - Manuel Pinto da Fonseca, Grand Master (1741–1773)
  - Francisco Ximénez de Tejada, Grand Master (1773–1775)
  - Emmanuel de Rohan-Polduc, Grand Master (1775–1797)
  - Ferdinand von Hompesch, Grand Master (1797–1798)
- Malta Protectorate (complete list) –

British protectorate, 1800–1813
For details see the United Kingdom under British Isles, Europe

- Gozo –
  - Ferdinand, King (1798–1802)

=== Southwest ===
Andorra

- Andorra
  - Episcopal Co-Princes (complete list) –
    - Julià Cano Thebar, Episcopal Co-Prince (1695–1714)
    - Simeó de Guinda i Apeztegui, Episcopal Co-Prince (1714–1737)
    - Jordi Curado i Torreblanca, Episcopal Co-Prince (1738–1747)
    - Sebastià de Victoria Emparán y Loyola, Episcopal Co-Prince (1747–1756)
    - Francesc Josep Catalán de Ocón, Episcopal Co-Prince (1757–1762)
    - Francesc Fernández de Xátiva y Contreras, Episcopal Co-Prince (1763–1771)
    - Joaquín de Santiyán y Valdivielso, Episcopal Co-Prince (1771–1779)
    - Juan de García y Montenegro, Episcopal Co-Prince (1780–1783)
    - Josep de Boltas, Episcopal Co-Prince (1785–1795)
    - Francesc Antoni de la Dueña y Cisneros, Episcopal Co-Prince (1797–1816)
  - French Co-Princes (complete list) –
    - Louis XIV, French Co-Prince (1643–1715)
    - Louis XV, French Co-Prince (1715–1774)
    - Louis XVI, French Co-Prince (1774–1792)

Portugal

- Kingdom of Portugal (complete list) –
  - Peter II, King (1683–1706)
  - John V, King (1706–1750)
  - Joseph I, King (1750–1777)
  - Maria I, Queen (1777–1816)

Spain

- Bourbon Spain
  - Monarchs (complete list) –
    - Charles of Austria, as Charles III, disputed King (1703–1715)
    - Philip V, King (1700–1724)
    - Louis I, King (1724)
    - Philip V, King (1724–1746)
    - Ferdinand VI, King (1746–1759)
    - Charles III, King (1759–1788)
    - Charles IV, King (1788–1808)

=== West ===
France

- Kingdom of France: Ancien Régime (complete list) –
  - Louis XIV, King (1643–1715)
  - Louis XV, King (1715–1774)
  - Louis XVI, King (1774–1791 / 1791–1792)
- Constitutional monarchy of France (complete list) –
  - Louis XVI, King (1774–1791 / 1791–1792)
- French First Republic (complete list) –
  - Georges Danton, leading figure (1792)
  - Jean-Marie Roland de la Platière, leading figure (1792–1793)
  - Étienne Clavière, leading figure (1793)
  - Georges Danton, leading figure (1793)
  - Maximilien Robespierre, leading figure (1793–1794)
  - Lazare Carnot, leading figure (1794)
  - Jean-Jacques-Régis de Cambacérès, leading figure (1794)
  - Lazare Carnot, leading figure (1794–1795)
  - Jean-Jacques-Régis de Cambacérès, leading figure (1795)
  - Lazare Carnot, Director of the French Directory (1795–1797)
  - Paul Barras, President of the Directory (1797–1799)
  - Emmanuel Joseph Sieyès, leading Member of the Directory (1799)
  - Napoleon Bonaparte, First Consul (1799–1804)

French

- Anjou (complete list) –
  - Louis the Beloved, Duke (1710–1715)
  - Philip, Duke (1730–1733)
  - Louis the Desired, Duke (1755–1795)
- Corsican Republic –
  - Pasquale Paoli, President (1755–1769)
- Monaco (complete list) –
  - Louis I, Prince (1662–1701)
  - Antonio I, Prince (1701–1731)
  - Louise Hippolyte, Princess (1731)
  - Jacques I, Prince (1731–1733)
  - Honoré III, Prince (1733–1793)
- Duchy of Nevers (complete list) –
  - Philippe Jules Mancini, Duke (1661–1707)
  - Philip Julius Francis Mancini, Duke (1707–1768)
  - Louis-Jules Mancini, Duke (1768–1798)

Low Countries

- United Provinces: Dutch Republic
  - Stadtholders (complete list) –
    - William III, Stadtholder (1672–1702)
    - William IV, Stadtholder (1747–1751)
    - William V, Stadtholder (1751–1795)
  - Grand pensionaries (complete list) –
    - Anthonie Heinsius, Grand Pensionary (1689–1720)
    - Isaac van Hoornbeek, Grand Pensionary (1720–1727)
    - Simon van Slingelandt, Grand Pensionary (1727–1736)
    - Anthonie van der Heim, Grand Pensionary (1737–1746)
    - Willem Buys, Grand Pensionary (1746)
    - Jacob Gilles, Grand Pensionary (1747–1749)
    - Pieter Steyn, Grand Pensionary (1749–1772)
    - Pieter van Bleiswijk, Grand Pensionary (1772–1787)
    - Laurens Pieter van de Spiegel, Grand Pensionary (1787–1795)
- Batavian Republic (complete list) –
  - Uitvoerend Bewind (1798–1801)
- County of Artois (complete list) –
  - Philip V, Count (1700–1713)
  - Charles IV, Count (1713–1740)
  - Maria Theresa, Countess (1740–1780)
- County of Drenthe (complete list) –
  - William III, Stadtholder (1696–1702)
  - Second Stadtholderless Period, Stadtholder (1702–1722)
  - William IV, Stadtholder (1722–1751)
  - William V, Stadtholder (1751–1795)
- County of Flanders (complete list) –
  - Philip VII, Count (1700–1706)
  - Charles V, Count (1714–1740)
  - Maria Theresa, Countess (1740–1780)
  - Francis I, Count (1740–1765)
  - Joseph I, Count (1780–1790)
  - Leopold, Count (1790–1792)
  - Francis II, Count (1792–1835)
- Lordship of Frisia (complete list) –
  - John William Friso, Stadtholder (1696–1711)
  - William IV, Stadtholder (1711–1747)
- Lordship of Groningen (complete list) –
  - Henriette Amalia von Anhalt, Regent (1696–1707)
  - John William Friso, Stadtholder (1696–1711)
  - Marie Louise von Hessen-Kassel, regentess for William IV, Stadtholder (1711–1729)
  - William IV, Stadtholder (1711–1747)
- Duchy of Guelders (complete list) –
  - William III, Stadtholder (1675–1702)
  - Second Stadtholderless Period, Stadtholder (1702–1722)
  - William IV, Stadtholder (1722–1747)
- County of Holland, Lordship of Utrecht, County of Zeeland (complete list) –
  - William III, Stadtholder (1672–1702)
  - Second Stadtholderless Period, Stadtholder (1702–1747)
- Lordship of Overijssel (complete list) –
  - William III, Stadtholder (1675–1702)
  - Second Stadtholderless Period, Stadtholder (1702–1747)
  - William IV, Stadtholder (1747–1751)
  - William V, Stadtholder (1751–1795)

=== Caucasus ===
Azerbaijan

- Baku Khanate (complete list) –
  - Mirza Muhammad II, Khan (1797–1801)
  - Husayn Quli, Khan (1801–1806)
- Ganja Khanate (complete list) –
  - Javad, Khan (1786–1804)
- Nakhichevan Khanate (complete list) –
  - Kalbali, Khan (1787–1823)
  - Ehsan Kangarlu, Khan (1823–1828)
  - Karim Kangarlu, Khan (1828–1834)
- Quba Khanate (complete list) –
  - Shaykh Ali Agha, Khan (1791–1806)
  - Husayn, Khan (1806–1816)

Georgia

- Principality of Abkhazia (complete list) –
  - Rostom Sharvashidze, Prince (c.1700–1730)
  - Manuchar Sharvashidze, Prince (c.1730–1750)
  - Zurab Sharvashidze, Prince (c.1750–1780)
  - Kelesh Ahmed-Bey Sharvashidze, Prince (c.1780–1808)
- Kingdom of Imereti (complete list) –
  - Simon, King (1698–1701)
  - Mamia III, King (1701–1702, 1711, 1713)
  - George V, King (1702–1707)
  - George VI, King (1707–1711, 1712–1713, 1713–1716, 1719–1720)
  - George IV Gurieli, King (1716)
  - Alexander V, King (1720–1741, 1741–1746, 1749–1752)
  - George VII, King (1741)
  - Mamuka, King (1746–1749)
  - Solomon I, King (1752–1766, 1768–1784)
  - Teimuraz, King (1766–1768)
  - David II, King (1784–1789, 1790–1791)
  - Solomon II, King (1789–1790, 1792–1810)
- Kingdom of Kakheti (complete list) –

direct Persian rule (1676–1703)

  - David II, King (1703–1722)
  - Constantine II, King (1722–1732)
  - Teimuraz II, King (1732–1744)
  - Heraclius II, King (1744–1762)
- Kingdom of Kartli (complete list) –
  - Heraclius I, King (1688–1703)
  - George XI, King (1676–1688, 1703–1709)
  - Kaikhosro, King (1709–1711)
  - Jesse, King (1714–1716, 1724–1727)
  - Vakhtang VI, King (1716–1724)
  - Bakar, King (1717–1719)
  - Constantine III (Constantine II of Kakheti), King (1723)
  - Alexander II (Ali Mirza), Viceroy (1735–c.1737)
  - Teimuraz II, King (1744–1762)
- Kingdom of Kartli-Kakheti (complete list) –
  - Heraclius II, King (1762–1798)
  - George XII, King (1798–1800)
  - David Bagrationi, Regent (1800–1801)

Russia: Dagestan

- Avar Khanate –
  - Umma, Khan (1774–1801)
- Gazikumukh Khanate (complete list) –
  - Surkhay ibn Muhammad, Khan (1789–1820)
  - Aslan ibn Shakhmardan, Khan (1820–1836)
  - Nutsal-Aga ibn Aslan, Khan (1836–1836)
  - Muhammad-Mirza ibn Aslan, Khan (1836–1838)
  - Ummu Kulsum-Beke, Khan (1838–1841)
  - Abdurrahman ibn Umar, Khan (1841–1847)
  - Aglar ibn Umar, Khan (1847–1859)
  - Jafar ibn Aglar, Khan (1877–1877)

== Oceania ==
=== Australia ===
Australia

- Colony of New South Wales (complete list) –

British colony, 1788–1900
For details see the United Kingdom under British Isles, Europe

=== Pacific ===
Chile

- Easter Island (complete list) –
  - Te Ravarava (Terava Rara), King (?)
  - Tehitehuke, King (?)
  - Te Rahai or Terahai, King (?)
  - Te Huke, King (?)
  - Tuu, from Mata Nui (Ko Tuu?), King (c.1770)
  - Hotu Iti, King (c.1773)
  - Honga, King (?)
  - Te Kena, King (?)

French Polynesia

- Alo (complete list) –
  - Mala'evaoa, King
  - Nimo o le Tano'a, King
  - Veliteki, King (1748–1756)
  - unspecified, King (1756–1784)
  - Fonati, King (1784–c.1839)
- Kingdom of Bora Bora (complete list) –
  - Teri'imaevarua I, Ari'i Rahi (?–1778)
  - Tapoa I, King (1772–1812)
- Kingdom of Huahine (complete list) –
  - Tehaʻapapa I, de facto paramount ruler (f) (1760–1790)
  - Teriʻitaria I, King (1790–1793)
  - Tenania, King (1793–1810)
- Sigave (complete list) –
  - Tuikamea, King (1784–?)
  - Inosiopogoi, King (late 18th century)
  - Latuka, King (?–1800)
  - Vanae, King (1800–1839)
- Kingdom of Tahiti –
  - Pōmare I, King (1791–1803)
- Uvea (complete list) –
  - Manuka, King (1767–1810)

New Zealand: Niue

- Monarchy of Niue (complete list) –
  - Puni-mata, Patu-iki (c.1700–?)
  - Patua-valu, Patu-iki (?)

Tonga

- Tuʻi Tonga Empire (complete list) –
  - Kafoamotalau, King (?)
  - Tuʻionukulave, King (?)
  - Silivakaifanga, King (?)
  - Fuatakifolaha, King (?)
  - Tupoulahi, King (?)
  - Maealiuaki, King (?)
  - Mumui, King (?)
  - Toafunaki, King (c.1790)
  - Mulikihaʻamea, King (?)
- Tuʻi Tonga Empire (complete list) –
  - Mumui, Tuʻi Kanokupolu (?)
  - Tukuʻaho, Tuʻi Kanokupolu (1793–1799)
  - Maʻafu-ʻo-limuloa, Tuʻi Kanokupolu (1799)
  - Tupoumālohi, Tuʻi Kanokupolu (1799–1812)

United Kingdom: Pitcairn

- Pitcairn Island (complete list) –
  - Fletcher Christian, Leader (1790–1793)
  - Ned Young, Leader (1793–1800)
  - John Adams, Leader (1800–1829)

United States: Hawaii

- Kauai (complete list) –
  - Kualii, King (?–1730)
  - Peleioholani, King (1730–1770)
  - Kamakahelei, (female) King (1770–1794)
  - Kaumualiʻi, King of Kaua'i and Ni'ihau (1794–1810)
- Island of Hawaiʻi (complete list) –
  - Keaweʻīkekahialiʻiokamoku, co-ruler with his half-sister wife Kalanikauleleiaiwi (1695–1725)
  - Alapaʻinui, supreme high chief (1725–1754)
  - Keaweʻōpala, supreme high chief (c.1754)
  - Kalaniʻōpuʻu, supreme high chief (1754–1782)
  - Kīwalaʻō, supreme high chief (1782)
  - Kamehameha I, supreme high chief (1782–1795)
- Hawaiian Kingdom (complete list) –
  - Kamehameha I, King (1795–1819)

== See also ==
- List of governors of dependent territories in the 18th century
- List of state leaders in the 18th-century Holy Roman Empire
- List of state leaders in 18th-century British South Asia and its predecessor states
