= Alfonso V =

Alfonso V (Spanish), Afonso V (Portuguese), Alfons V (Catalan) or Alphonse V (French) may refer to:

- Alfonso V of León (999–1028)
- Alfonso V of Aragon (1416–1458), The Magnanimous
- Afonso V of Portugal (r. 1438–1481), The African
- Afonso V of Kongo (r. 1785–1787)
