= Garcia IV =

Garcia IV may refer to:

- García IV of Pamplona or Navarre
  - García Sánchez III of Pamplona (r. 1035–1054)
  - García Ramírez of Navarre (r. 1134–1150)
- Garcia IV of Kongo (r. 1743–1752)
