= Jayin =

- Aláàfin of Oyo
- Reign: 1665 - 1676
- Predecessor: Aláàfin Kanran
- Successor: Aláàfin Ayibi

Jayin was a unpopular Alaafin of the Oyo Empire, who was ordered to commit suicide by the Oyo Mesi after having killed his own son.

Jayin was the son of Oba Kanran. Like his father, Jayin was reportedly an unpopular ruler. He was considered to be an effeminate and dissolute prince prior to his accession to the throne. As king of Oyo, his harem was usually filled with varied sort of characters. However, it was his son who carried the hopes and aspirations of the people during his reign, in the process triggering jealousy from the King.

Jayin allegedly poisoned his son, Prince Olusi. Olusi was kind and generous, but his stay in the palace was short-lived. Some accounts state that he was raised in his father's house and one day succumbed to a tryst with one of his father's wives. The prince was caught and inevitably had an audience with Jayin, who could not control his jealousy and poisoned the prince.

Olusi's death was a tragic event in Oyo and shattered the hopes of many citizens. The chiefs began to suspect foul play and vowed to find the cause of death. During Olusi's funeral, the King was asked to abdicate the throne, preferably committing suicide. According to legend, he committed suicide upon hearing Egungun chanters approach his palace, knowing that Olusi's murder would be the subject of their songs.

The throne then passed to Olusi's young son, Ayibi.

It was during Jayin's reign the title of Awujale of Ijebu was created.
