= Joaquim I of Kongo =

Ruler of the Kingdom of Kongo (1793–1794)

Joaquim I was ruler of the Kingdom of Kongo from 1793 until 1794, possibly after having seized the throne from his predecessor, Aleixo I, though this is unknown. His reign was very short before it passed on to Henrique II who is credited with the reconstruction of the kingdom after the period of turmoil following the death of Alfonso V.

Preceded by Aleixo I	Manikongo; 1793–1794	Succeeded by Henrique II
