= Yakubu (Gobir ruler) =

Yakubu was ruler of the Hausa city-state of Gobir (in what is now northern Nigeria) from 1795 to 1801. Succeeding Bawa, Yakubu waged a number of military campaigns. His reign is also noted for a deterioration of relations between the Hausa elite of Gobir and Fulani Islamic reformer Usman dan Fodio, who would soon oppose them in the Fulani War. Yakubu was killed in 1801 in an attempt to storm the Zamfara fortress of Kiyawa.
