= Jauhar ul-Alam =

Sultan of Aceh (died 1726)

Jauharul Alam Syarif Aminuddin Jamalullail جوهر العلم شريف أمين الدين جمال الليل
- Sultan
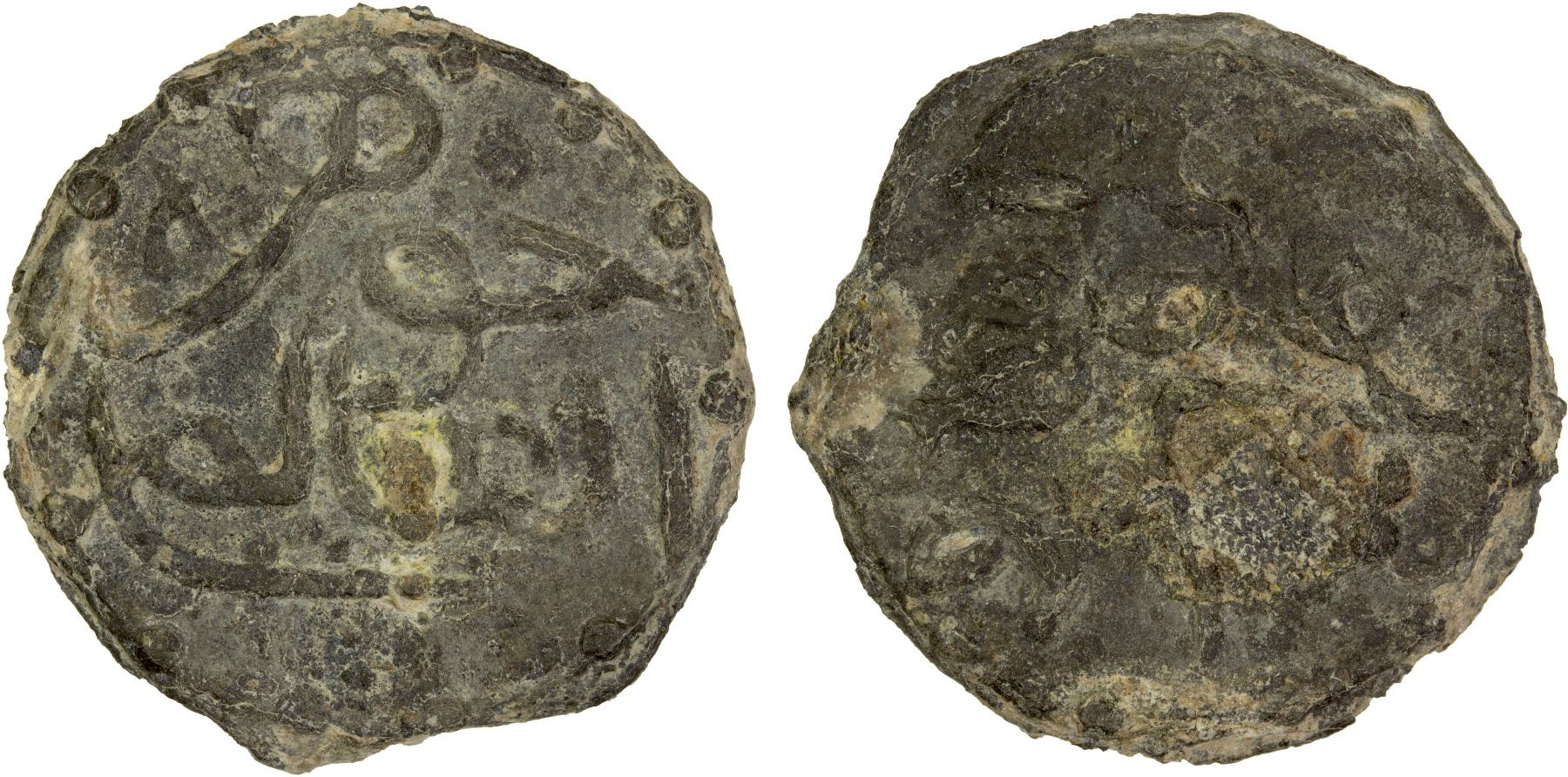
- Coin of Sultan Jauhar al-Alam Shah.

Sultan of Aceh Sultanate
- Reign: 1726
- Predecessor: Jamal ul-Alam Badr ul-Munir
- Successor: Syamsul Alam
- Born: Banda Aceh, Aceh Sultanate
- Died: 1726; Banda Aceh, Aceh Sultanate
- House: Jamal ul-Lail
- Religion: Islam

Sultan Jauhar ul-Alam Amauddin Syah (died 1726) was the twenty-first sultan of Aceh. He ruled very briefly in 1726. Some sources date his reign in 1723.

Under the name Panglima Maharaja he was originally the local maharaja of Kampong Pahang. He was also a counselor to his overlord, Sultan Jamal ul-Alam Badr ul-Munir. The latter was badly cornered by a rebellion by one of the sagis (regions) in 1726 and had to take refuge in a fortress. As the other sagis joined the uprising, Jamal ul-Alam fled to Pidië on the advice of Panglima Maharaja. After some political chaos Panglima Maharaja stepped forward and was enthroned, although he had previously sworn not to betray Jamal ul-Alam. He took the regnal title Sultan Jauhar ul-Alam Amauddin Syah but died after only seven (or twenty) days. In his place the chiefs chose Wandi Tebing alias Syamsul Alam as sultan.

== Literature ==
- Djajadiningrat, Raden Hoesein (1911) 'Critische overzicht van de in Maleische werken vervatte gegevens over de geschiedenis van het soeltanaat van Atjeh', Bijdragen tot de Taal-, Land- en Volkenkunde 65, pp. 135-265.
- Taniputera, Ivan (2013) Kerajaan-kerajaan Nusantara pascakeruntuhan Majapahit. Jakarta: Gloria Group.

Preceded by Jamal ul-Alam Badr ul-Munir	Sultan of Aceh Sultanate; 1726	Succeeded by Syamsul Alam
