= Nicolau I of Kongo =

Ruler of the Kingdom of Kongo

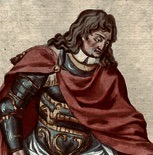
illustration of Nicolas I of Kongo

Nicolau I Misaki mia Nimi was the ruler of the Kingdom of Kongo as a member of the House of Kimpanzu from 1752 until sometime after 1758, during the rotating houses period established by Pedro IV.

Preceded by Garcia IV	Manikongo; 1752–1758 (ruler until unknown time shortly after 1758)	Succeeded by Afonso IV
