= Henrique II of Kongo =

Ruler of the Kingdom of Kongo from 1794 to 1803

Henrique II was ruler of the Kingdom of Kongo in 1794 – 1803.

His rule came after the end of a period of conflict in the kingdom after the death of Afonso V, who was said to have been poisoned. Henrique was able to take the throne as a compromise between the various powerful factions which had been brokered by the Água Rosada house, the descendants of Pedro IV, who had familial ties to branches of both Kinlaza and Kimpanzu houses. Under this peace, Henrique was able to rebuild the nation, and eventually passed the throne on to Garcia V, a member of the Água Rosada house.

== Sources ==
- John K. Thorton, Mbanza Kongo/Sao Salvador : Kongo's Holy City
- Africa's Urban Past, Oxford, James Currey (ed. David M. Andreson and Richard Rathbone), Portsmouth, Heinemann, 2000, ISBN 978-0-325-00221-7, pp. 73–78.

| Preceded by Joaquim I | Manikongo; 1794 – 1803 | Succeeded by Garcia V |
