= Ayibi =

Ayabi
- Aláàfin of Oyo
- Reign: 1676 - 1690
- Predecessor: Aláàfin Jayin
- Successor: Aláàfin Osiyago

Ayabi was an Aláàfin of the Oyo Empire.

He succeeded his grandfather Aláàfin Jayin and was chosen by the Oyo Mesi out of respect for his popular father Olusii, who was killed by the late Aláàfin. He was chosen as an infant and until he came of age the Bashorun reigned as regent. Ayabi turned out to be a cruel and tyrannical Aláàfin, like his predecessors.

According to legend he killed the parents of one of his wives, due to a passing remark she made while he was on the toilet. For this cruelty but also because of infighting between the Oyo Mesi and Aláàfin he was rejected and forced to commit suicide.
