= Garcia IV of Kongo =

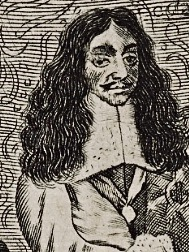
Garcia IV KONGO

Garcia IV or Garcia IV Nkanga (died 1752) was ruler of the Kingdom of Kongo from 1743 until 1752. He ruled in a period of "rotating lineages", which was a plan reportedly devised by Pedro IV of Kongo. Garcia IV had once been the Marquis of Matari.

Garcia was from the Kinlaza lineage.

Preceded by Manuel II of Kongo	Manikongo; 1743–1752	Succeeded by Nicolau I of Kongo
