= Afonso V of Kongo =

Afonso V of the Congo (Ndo Mfunsu V in Kikongo and Afonso V in Portuguese) was a Kinlaza manikongo of the Kingdom of Kongo from 1785 to 1787.

He succeeded to his brother José I of Kongo without any struggle in April 1785 and was part of the southern faction of the Kanda Kinzala based in Nkondo. He was a king known for his piety and took the pompous title of the powerful Dom Alfonso V, King of Congo, ruler of part of Ethiopia in his letters. It is possible he was poisoned by his successor in order to seize the throne. His sudden death caused a period of turmoil within the nation that would not end until Henrique II took the throne.

After his death, war once again broke out between the Kinlaza and Kimpanzu over the throne. This provided the Atlantic Slave Trade with a plentiful amount of Kongo captives from 1787 to 1794, ending when Henrique II took the throne as a compromise. Many of these captives would disembark in the French West Indies. It is estimated that up to 62,000 Kongo slaves were trafficked to the Americas during the conflict between the Kimpanzu and Kinlaza factions, between 1780 and 1790.

== Sources ==
- Thornton, John K. (2000). "Mbanza Kongo/Sao Salvador: Kongo's Holy City". In Anderson, David M.; Rathbone, Richard (eds.). Africa's Urban Past. Oxford: James Currey Ltd. pp. 73–78. ISBN 978-0-85255-761-7.

Preceded by José I of Kongo	Manikongo; 1785–1787	Succeeded by Álvaro XII of Kongo
