= Prince consort =

Husband of a regnant monarch

A prince consort is the husband of a monarch who is not a monarch in his own right. In recognition of his status, a prince consort may be given a formal title, such as prince. Most monarchies do not allow the husband of a queen regnant to be titled as a king because it is perceived as a higher title than queen. However, some monarchies use the title of king consort (Note: Out of the 43 present monarchies, the Monarchy of Spain is the only to systematically use the title of King consort. Historically, Portugal, Scotland, and Great Britain used the title for Peter III of Portugal and Ferdinand II of Portugal; Francis II of France and Henry Stuart, Lord Darnley; and Philip II of Spain, respectively. The title is in desuetude, as all Spanish monarchs who used it were part of the royal family suo jure, and thus, unexpected to be used hereafter, as it at odds with the traditional protocol surrounding a future Queen regnant.) for the role.

== Usage in Europe ==
=== United Kingdom ===
In the United Kingdom, the title Prince Consort is unique to Prince Albert, although the term applies as a description to other British princes consort. The title was awarded to him in 1857 by his wife, Queen Victoria. Before Prince Albert, there had only been five English, Scottish or British male consorts, being the husbands of Mary I of England, Queen Anne of Britain, and Mary, Queen of Scots, the last of whom was married three times during her long reign. The remaining queens regnant before Victoria sidestepped the question of the proper title for a male consort, Elizabeth I having never married, and Mary II's husband William III having been explicitly made king in his own right.

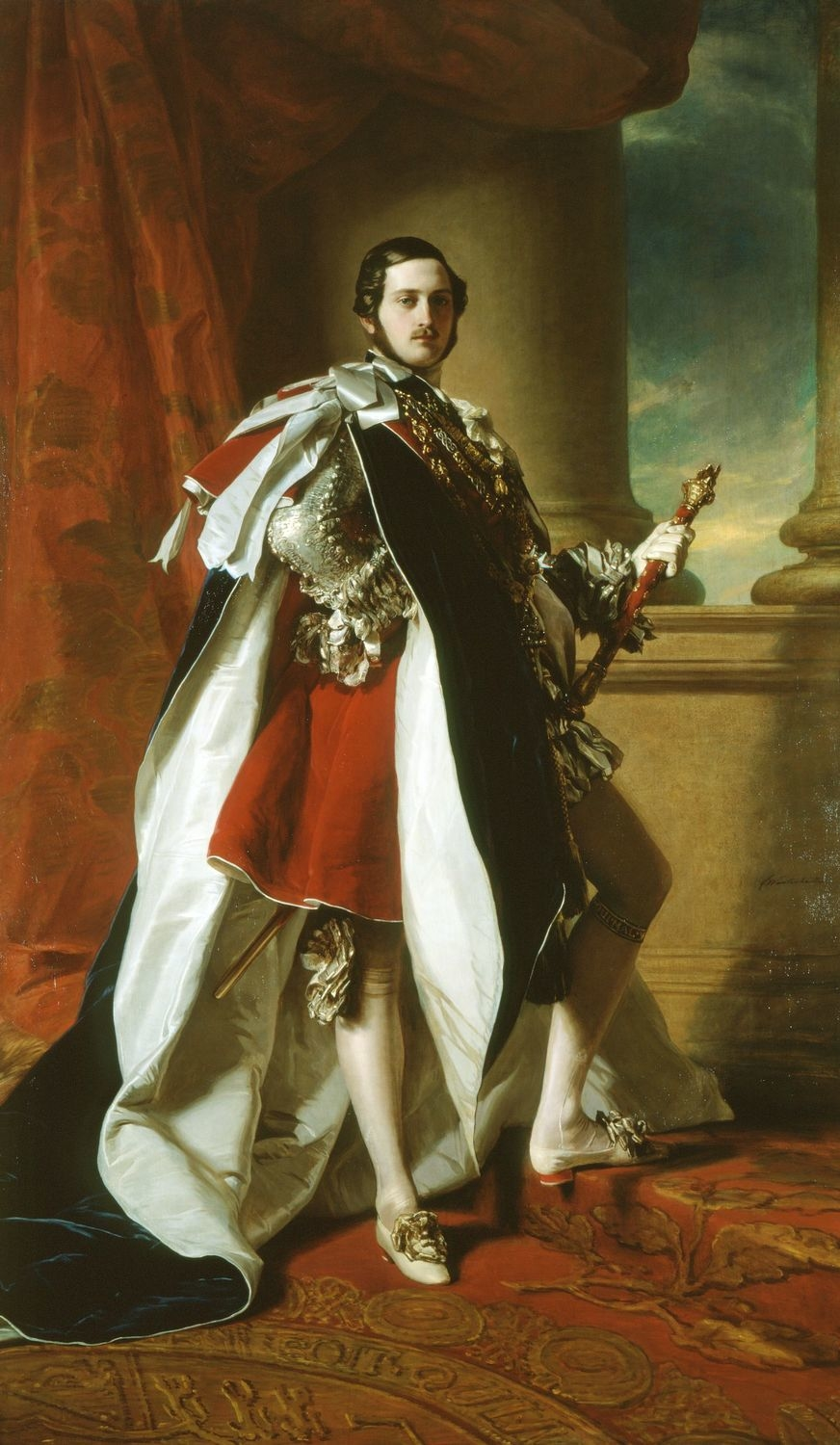
Portrait of Prince Albert by Franz Xaver Winterhalter. Prince Albert was awarded the title Prince Consort in 1857 by his wife, Queen Victoria.

The titles of the five pre-Victorian male consorts varied widely. Philip of Spain, the husband of Mary I of England, was declared king jure uxoris and given powers equal to his wife while she reigned, but Queen Anne's husband Prince George of Denmark received no British titles other than the Dukedom of Cumberland (his princely title being Danish). Meanwhile, the titles of the three husbands of Mary, Queen of Scots, was never fully resolved. At least one (Henry Stuart, Lord Darnley), was declared king consort, and both he and his predecessor Francis II of France sought recognition as king jure uxoris (under a proffered theory of the "Crown Matrimonial of Scotland"), but the title and powers of the consort were a constant issue during Mary's reign and remained unresolved when Mary was captured and executed.

The only male consort since Prince Albert's death, Prince Philip, Duke of Edinburgh, the consort of Elizabeth II, was made a peer of the United Kingdom in advance of his marriage to then-Princess Elizabeth in 1947. After Elizabeth's accession in 1952, there was debate in royal circles and among senior politicians (both in Britain and in other Commonwealth Realms, particularly Canada) about her husband's proper title. Some leaders, including the prime minister of the day, Winston Churchill, suggested reviving Prince Albert's title of Prince Consort. Others put forward other styles, including "Prince of the Realm" and "Prince of the Commonwealth" (the latter of which was suggested by John Diefenbaker, at the time a member of the Canadian Opposition front bench). In 1957, Elizabeth created Philip a prince of the United Kingdom of Great Britain and Northern Ireland, the same title borne by sons of the sovereign.

The distinction between the positions of prince consort and king is important in the British patriarchal hierarchical system. Within this hierarchy, the king holds a higher position in the British social hierarchy than any other, and so more power is attributed to him. When the monarch is female, such as Queen Victoria, who ascended to the throne in 1837, power is attributed to the queen, for she holds the highest position in the absence of a king. Unlike a queen consort, a prince consort is not crowned and anointed alongside his wife at her coronation.

=== Other countries ===
Jacques I became the prince consort of Monaco in 1731 after his wife, Louise Hippolyte, became the sovereign princess.

In 2005, Prince Henrik, the husband of Margrethe II of Denmark, was awarded the title. He had requested the title of "king consort" and style of His Majesty but was denied. In 2016, he announced that upon his retirement, he would revert to the title of prince that he had received upon their marriage in 1967.

== King consort ==
A king consort or emperor consort is a rarely used title to describe the husband of a queen regnant. Examples include:

- Mary, Queen of Scots (reigned 1542–1567) was first married to Francis, Dauphin of France (later Francis II of France), who became king consort of Scotland upon their marriage. She then married Henry Stuart, Lord Darnley, the eldest son of the Earl and Countess of Lennox in July 1565. Darnley was a great-grandson of Henry VII of England and Mary's first cousin, and he was considered to have a strong claim to the Scottish throne. On the evening before their marriage, Mary proclaimed Darnley "King of Scots", a title that she could not legally grant him without the consent of Parliament, but which was never formally challenged. However, this title did not grant him any automatic right of rule or of succession to the throne should Mary die. For that to happen, it was necessary that Mary grant him the Crown Matrimonial of Scotland, which never happened.
- When the reigning Isabella II (reigned 1833–1868) married Francis, Duke of Cádiz, he became king consort of Spain. Like his wife, he retained the style and title of king even after her abdication in favour of their son, Alfonso XII.

== List of male consorts ==
Bhopal State

- Baqi Muhammad Khan – husband of Shah Jahan Begum
- Siddiq Hasan Khan – husband of Shah Jahan Begum
- Ahmad Ali Khan Bahadur – husband of Sultan Jahan Begum

Đại Việt

- Trần Thái Tông – he was first a male consort of the empress regnant Lý Chiêu Hoàng, but later became a male monarch

Denmark

- Prince Henrik of Denmark – husband of Queen Margrethe II

Duchy of Parma

- Adam Albert, Count of Neipperg – husband of the sovereign duchess Marie Louise
- Charles-René de Bombelles – husband of the sovereign duchess Marie Louise

Ecatepec

- Moctezuma II – husband of Tlapalizquixochtzin

Ethiopian Empire

- Gugsa Welle – husband of the empress regnant Zewditu

Grand Duchy of Tuscany

- Felice Pasquale Baciocchi – husband of Elisa Bonaparte

Hawaiian Kingdom

- John Owen Dominis – husband of Queen Liliʻuokalani

Kingdom of Aragon

- Ramon Berenguer IV, Count of Barcelona – husband of Petronilla

Kingdom of England

- Geoffrey of Anjou – husband of Matilda
- Guildford Dudley – husband of Lady Jane Grey

Kingdom of Georgia

- Yury Bogolyubsky – husband of Tamar the Great
- David Soslan – husband of Tamar the Great
- Ghias ad-Din – husband of Rusudan

Kingdom of the Maldives

- Mohamed el-Jameel - husband of Sultana Khadijah
- Abdullah I - husband of Sultana Khadijah
- Mohamed I - husband of Sultana Raadhafathi
- Abdullah II - husband of Sultana Dhaain

Kingdom of Naples

- Andrew, Duke of Calabria – husband of Queen Joanna I
- James IV of Majorca – husband of Queen Joanna I
- Otto, Duke of Brunswick-Grubenhagen – husband of Queen Joanna I
- James II, Count of La Marche – husband of Queen Joanna II

Kingdom of Pontus

- Archelaus – husband of Pythodorida

Kingdom of Scotland

- Francis II of France – husband of Queen Mary
- Henry Stuart, Lord Darnley – husband of Queen Mary
- James Hepburn, 4th Earl of Bothwell – husband of Queen Mary

Kingdom of Rarotonga

- Ngamaru Rongotini Ariki – husband of Makea Takau Ariki

Kingdom of Tahiti

- Tapoa II – husband of Pōmare IV
- Ariifaaite – husband of Pōmare IV

Luxembourg

- Prince Felix of Bourbon-Parma – husband of the sovereign grand duchess Charlotte

Majapahit

- Cakradhara – husband of Queen Tribhuwana
- Ratnapangkaja – husband of Queen Suhita

Māori King Movement

- Whatumoana Paki – husband of Te Atairangikaahu

Merina Kingdom

- Rainiharo – husband of Ranavalona I
- Rainijohary – husband of Ranavalona I
- Rainivoninahitriniony – husband of Rasoherina
- Rainilaiarivony – he married three queens in succession: Rasoherina, Ranavalona II and Ranavalona III

Monaco

- Jacques I, Prince of Monaco – he was first a male consort of the sovereign princess Louise Hippolyte, but later became a male monarch

Netherlands

- Duke Henry of Mecklenburg-Schwerin – husband of Queen Wilhelmina
- Prince Bernhard of Lippe-Biesterfeld – husband of Queen Juliana
- Prince Claus of the Netherlands – husband of Queen Beatrix

Portugal

- Auguste, Duke of Leuchtenberg – husband of Maria II
- Ferdinand II of Portugal – he was first a male consort of the female monarch Maria II, but later became a co-monarch

Ptolemaic Kingdom

- Seleucus VII Kybiosaktes – husband of Berenice IV
- Archelaus I of Comana – husband of Berenice IV
- Mark Antony – husband of Cleopatra VII

Silla

- Galmunwang Eum – husband of Queen Seondeok
- Kim Wi-hong – husband of Queen Jinseong

Spain

- Francisco de Asís, Duke of Cádiz – husband of Queen Isabella II

Sweden

- Frederick I of Sweden – he was first a male consort of the queen regnant Ulrika Eleonora, but later became a male monarch

Tonga

- Viliami Tungī Mailefihi – husband of Sālote Tupou III

Travancore

- Raja Raja Varma – Koyi Thampuran of Gowri Lakshmi Bayi

United Kingdom/Great Britain

- Prince George, Duke of Cumberland – husband of Queen Anne
- Prince Albert of Saxe-Coburg and Gotha – husband of Queen Victoria
- Prince Philip, Duke of Edinburgh – husband of Queen Elizabeth II

== See also ==
- Consort crown
- Princess consort
- Queen consort
- List of British consorts
- Category:Kings consort
