= Abd al-Rauf al-Fansuri =

Islamic scholar of the Aceh Sultanate (1615–1693)

Syekh Abdurrauf al-Singkili
- عبد الرؤوف السنكيلي

Personal life
- Born: 1615 AD/1024 AH Singkil (present-day Aceh), Sultanate of Aceh
- Died: 1693 AD/1105 AH Kuala Aceh, Bandar Aceh Darussalam (present-day Banda Aceh), Sultanate of Aceh
- Resting place: Tomb of Syiah Kuala, Deah Raya Krueng Aceh, Banda Aceh, Indonesia
- Parent: Syekh Ali (father)
- Era: Sultanate of Aceh Golden Age
- Notable idea: Zuhud
- Notable work(s): Mir'at al-Thullab; Tarjuman al-Mustafid; Mawa'iz al-Badî'; Tanbih al-Masyi; Kifayat al-Muhtajin; Daqâiq al-Hurf
- Known for: The first translator of the Quran in the Malay world The first author of a tafsir book in Malay script

Religious life
- Religion: Islam
- Denomination: Sunni
- Order: Sufi
- Philosophy: Sufism
- Jurisprudence: Shafi'i
- Tariqa: Shattariyya, Qadiriyah

Muslim leader
- Disciple of: Ibrahim al-Kurani
- Influenced by: Burhanuddin Ulakan Abdul Muhyi Pamijahan Abdul Malik bin Abdullah (Tok Pulau Manis) Trengganu Baba Daud al-Rumi dari Bandar Aceh Darussalam
- Influenced: Ahmad al-Qushashi and Ibrahim al-Kurani

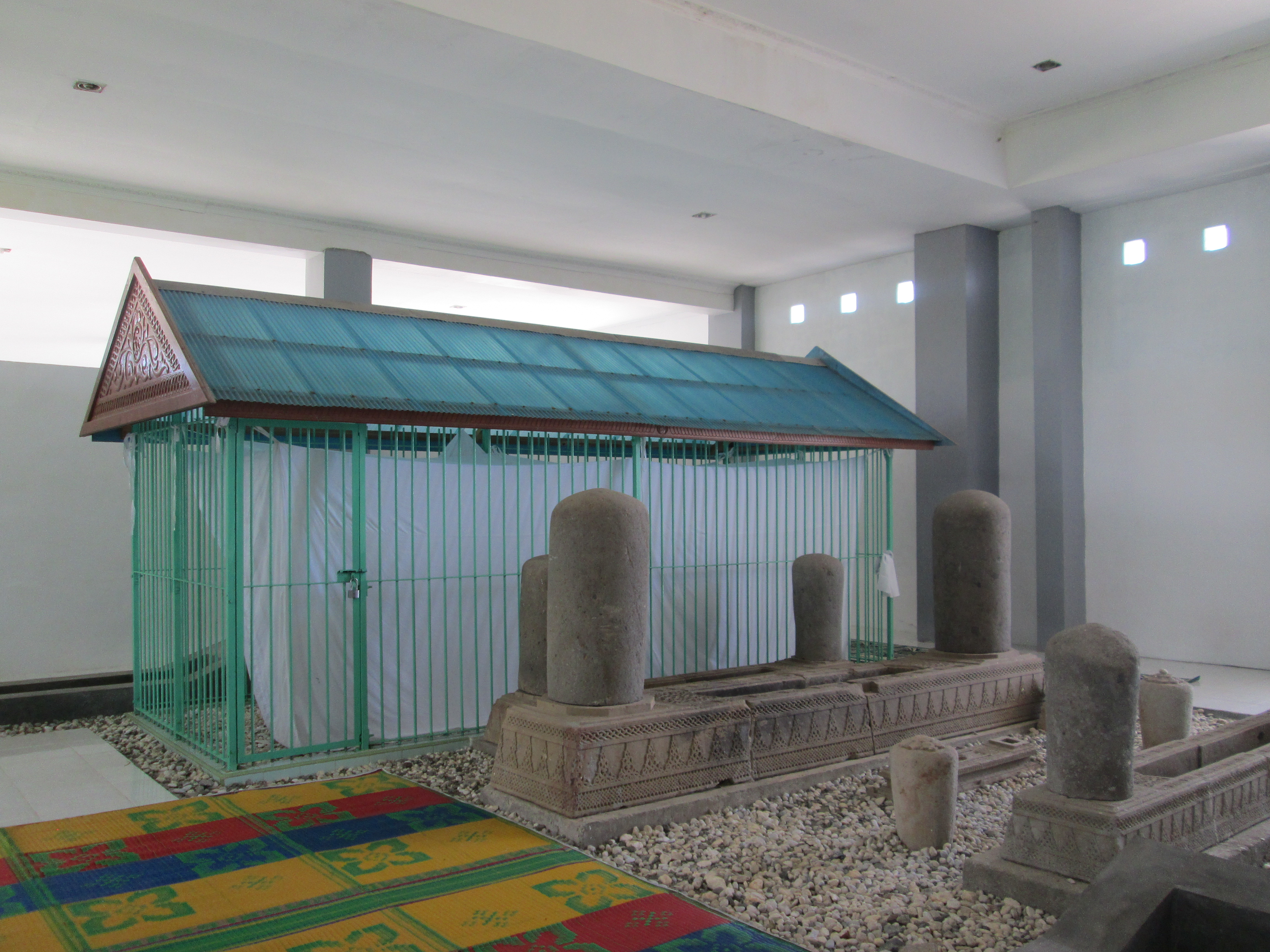
Abd al-Rauf al-Sinkili tomb (covered) in Banda Aceh

Amin al-Din Abd al-Rauf ibn Ali al-Jawi al-Fansuri al-Sinkili (Jawoe: أمين الدين عبد الرؤوف بن علي الجاوي الفنسوري السنكيلي) known as Syiah Kuala (spelling variation Abdurrauf Singkil, 1615–1693 CE) was a renowned Islamic scholar, spiritual leader of the Shattariyya tariqa and mufti of the Aceh Sultanate. He was a confidant of Sultana Safiat al-Din and first to spread the Shattari Sufi order in Indonesia and Southeast Asia. Many of his students became disseminators of Islam. He is commonly known as Sheikh Abd al-Rauf al-Sinkili and posthumously as Teungku Syiah Kuala (Acehnese: "Sheikh in the Estuary").

Al-Sinkili was believed to be a native of Singkil, a town on the western coast of Aceh. Beside being called Al-Sinkili, his other attribution (Arabic: nisba) was Al-Fansuri, relating him to the town of Barus. He could be related to another prominent Sufi poet and writer from that town, Hamzah Fansuri.

== Early life ==
His full name is Amin al-Din Abd al-Rauf ibn Ali al-Jawi tsuma al-Fansuri al-Sinkili. His family came from Persia or Arabia to Singkil, Aceh in the 13th century, although this is uncertain due to lack of the historical records, as well as the fact that his family name is not Arabic. Some believe, based on the name inscribed on his works, that he was of Malay descent from Fansur (Barus), while an oral tradition of the Aceh Singkil people holds that he was of Muslim Batak descent.

Al-Sinkili's first teacher was probably his father, Sheikh Ali al-Fansuri, a well known Acehnese scholar at the time. He later studied with ulama in Fansur and Banda Aceh. After completing his studies in Banda Aceh, he went to Mecca for Hajj and further education.

== Education ==
Al-Sinkili departed to Arabia around 1642, studying Islamic teachings for about twenty years in Doha, Yemen, Jeddah, Mecca, and mostly Madina. He became acquainted with Sufi scholars Ahmad al-Qushashi and Mulla Ibrahim al-Kurani, who taught him Sufism. A contemporary of Al-Sinkili from the Indonesian archipelago who befriended him and studied with him was Yusuf al-Makassari.

He listed 19 teachers and 27 other scholars with whom he had personal contacts in his book Umdat al-Muhtajin ila Suluk Maslak al-Mufridin. His two most respected teachers were Al-Qushashi and Al-Kurani. Al-Qushashi gave Al-Sinkili authorization (ijaza) as the formal successor (khalifa) for Shattariyya and Qadiriyya. After returning to Aceh, he maintained correspondence and asked for Al-Kurani's opinions regarding religious matters.

== Islamic missionary activity ==
After completing his studies in Islamic knowledge and Sufism, Al-Sinkili returned to Aceh around 1083 AH/1662, where he established a school. Students came from Aceh and other areas in the Indonesian archipelago. Some of his notable students included Burhan al-Din Ulakan (from Pariaman, West Sumatera), Abd al-Muhyi Pamijahan (from Tasikmalaya, West Java), Abd al-Malik ibn Abdullah (from Trengganu, Malay Peninsula), and Baba Dawud al Jawi al-Rumi (from Aceh).

== Shattariyya tariqa ==
Based on Syed Muhammad Naquib al-Attas, after Al-Sinkili received an ijaza (permission to teach) from Al-Qushashi in Medina, he then became the first person to introduce Shattariyya tariqa to the Indonesian archipelago. His name is also connected with the translation and interpretation of the Quran in Malay on Al-Baydawi's work Anwar al-Tanzil wa-Asrar al-Ta'wil, which was first published in Istanbul in 1884.

== Works ==
Al-Sinkili wrote in Malay and Arabic, covering topics such as Qur'anic interpretation (tafsir), scholastic theology (kalam), Sufism (tasawwuf), and Islamic jurisprudence (fiqh). He authored around twenty-two books. One of his famous book was titled Mir'ât al Thullab fi Tasyil Ma'rifah al Ahkâm al Syar'iyyah li al Mâlik al-Wahhab. The book discusses the many aspects of fiqh, such as rules and issues concerning marriage, financial transactions, and inheritance.

Some selected titles of his works include:

- Mir'ât al Thullab fi Tasyil Ma'rifah al Ahkâm al Syar'iyyah li al Mâlik al-Wahhab (fiqh rules for various activities), as requested by Sultana Safiat al-Din from Aceh.
- 'Umdat al-Muhtajin ila Suluk Maslak al-Mufridin (sufism)
- Lubb al-Kashf wa al-Bayan li Ma Yarahu al-Muhtadar bi al-'Iyan (dhikr prayer for death preparation)
- Kitab al-Fara'idh (inheritance law)
- Tarjuman al-Mustafid (Qur'an exegesis, mostly from tafsir al-Jalalayn), first complete of Quran interpretation in Malay language.
- Al-Arba'in Haditsan li al-Imam al-Nawawiyah (explanation of Al-Nawawi's forty hadiths)
- Al-Mawa'iz al-Badi' (hadith qudsi collection), contains a number of important advice in moral development.
- Kifayat al-Muhtajin ila Masharab al-Muwahhidin al-Qa'ilin bi Wahdat al-Wujud, explanation about wahdatul wujud concept.
- Daqa'iq al-Huruf, teaching about Sufism and theology.
- Risalah Adab Murid akan Syaikh (sufism), in Malay language.
- Risalah Mukhtasarah fi Bayan Shurut al-Shaykh wa al-Murid (sufism)
- Translate of Hadits Arba'in work of Imam Al-Nawawi, as requested by Sultana Zakiat al-Din from Aceh.
- Tanbih al-Masyi, contains about tasawwuf.

Some of Al-Sinkili's works were published by his students after his death.

== Teaching ==
His interpretation shows tendency of neo-Sufism, and combining exoteric and esoteric aspects of Islam. As a sheikh of the Shattariyya, Al-Sinkili did not approve of wujudiyya (pantheism) teaching, but did not openly oppose it like Al-Raniri.

== Death ==
Abd al-Rauf al-Sinkili died in 1693 at the age of 73. His tomb is located in Deah Raya, approximately 15 kilometers from Banda Aceh.
