= Maakurathu =

Maakurathu މާކުރަތު
- Inhabited island
- Location in Maldives
- Coordinates: 05°36′20″N 73°02′35″E
- Country: Maldives
- Administrative atoll: Raa Atoll
- Distance to Malé: 166.39 km (103.39 mi)

Government
  - President of council: Mohmmed Rameez

Area
  - Total: 0.50 km^{2} (0.19 sq mi)

Dimensions
  - Length: 0.935 km (0.581 mi)
  - Width: 0.829 km (0.515 mi)

Population (2022)
  - Total: 956
  - Density: 1,900/km^{2} (5,000/sq mi)
- Time zone: UTC+05:00 (MST)

Maakurathu (Dhivehi: މާކުރަތު) is one of the inhabited islands of Raa Atoll in the Maldives. Sultan Mohamed I is from Maakurathu. He is also the husband of Sultana Raadhafathi.

== Geography ==
The island is 166.39 km (103 mi; 90 nmi) north of the country's capital, Malé. Maakurathu's location coordinates are 73°02′52″E, 05°36′41″N. It is approximately 3,035 ft (925 m) in length and 2,706 ft (825 m) in width, and the area of the island is approximately 4,671,537 sq ft (43.4 ha).

== Council Members ==
- Mohamed Rameez (president)
- Ali Azleem (vice President)
- Abdusamad Yoosuf (council Members)
- Mariyam Saeedha ( council Member)
- Moomina Mohamed ( council Member)

== Demography ==
Historical population
| Year | Pop. | ±% |
|---|---|---|
| 2006 | 877 | — |
| 2014 | 769 | −12.3% |
| 2022 | 956 | +24.3% |
2006-2022: Census populations Source:

== Governance ==
- Maakurathu Council idhaaraa
- Maakurathu Magistrate Court
- Maakurathu Youth Center
- Maakurathu School
- Maakurathu pre-school
- Masjid salaam (Friday mosque)
- Masjid anwaar
- Masjid Najahiyya (special for Woman)

== Economy ==
The main source of the community's income comes from the lobster and Sea cucumber trade, fishing, agriculture, masonry, thatch weaving and rope making.

== Clubs and NGOs ==
The clubs and NGOs operating in Maakurathu are:

- Maakurathu Sports Club (registered date: 1 March 2000)
- Maakurathu Ekuveringe Dhirun (registered date: 17 January 2005)
- People's Association of Maakurathu - PEAMA (registered date: 2009)
- Maakurathu cooperative society - 16 November 2017

== Education ==
There is one government school, Maakurathu School, which provides education from grade 1 to 10. There is one pre-school, which is owned and run by the public and backed by Maakurathu Sports Club, which provides education for lower and upper kindergarten.

- 1 Maakurathu School ( grade 1 - 10 )
- 1 Maakurathu Pre-school ( Nursery, LKG )
- 1 Maakurathu Learning Center ( registered on 2022)

== Health ==
- Maakurathu Health Center

== Religion ==
There are three mosques on the island, one for men and two for women: Majid-Al-Salaam, Masjid-Al-Anwaar and Masjid-Al-(******). The two mosques for women are relatively small compared to the one for men. Masjid-Al-Salaam was completely demolished in August 2007 to build a new mosque.
