= Burhanuddin Ulakan =

Islamic cleric from West Sumatra, Indonesia (1646–1704)

Burhanuddin Ulakan Pariaman (1646–1704), also known as Sheikh Burhanuddin Ulakan, was an Islamic cleric (ulama) from the Minangkabau region. He is regarded as the pioneer of Islamic propagators in West Sumatra. He is also known as a commanding figure of the Islamic movements against the Dutch colonization. Regarding his Islamic belief, he was a Sufi murshid (scholar of spirituality) belonging to the Shattari tariqa based in Minangkabau region.

== Biography ==
=== Early life and education ===
Burhanuddin was born under the name Pono. He was born in the coastal city of Ulakan (today's Pariaman) within a sub-district of Padang Pariaman Regency. During his childhood, he was not aware of the teaching of Islam, because his parents and society had not been familiar with the religion. He and his father embraced Buddhism instead. Later, at the invitation and preaching of a Gujarat merchant who then spread Islam in Pekan Batang Bengkawas (now Pekan Tuo), young Burhanuddin and his father left Buddhism and converted to Islam.

At the age of maturity, Burhanuddin began to wander and leave the place of his parents. He studied in Aceh under Sheikh Abdur Rauf as-Singkili, an influential Mufti of Aceh Sultanate, who was a disciple and follower of Sheikh Ahmad al-Qusyasyi from Medina. Sheikh Ahmad had authorized both As-Singkili and Burhanuddin to spread Islam in their respective regions.

For ten years, Burhanuddin learned various sciences of Islam and tariqa from As-Singkili. Among the fields he studied include science in Arabic language, tafsir, hadith, fiqh, tawheed (science of monotheism), tasawwuf (science of Islamic mysticism), aqidah (Islamic creed), sharia and the concepts concerning tariqa, such as haqiqa and marifa.

=== Proselytization ===
After thirty years of studying in Aceh, Burhanuddin returned to his native Minangkabau to spread the teachings of Islam there. In 1680, he returned to Ulakan and established a surau (Islamic assembly building) in Tanjung Medan, located in a complex of about five hectares. There, he spread the teachings of Islam as well as developed the Shattari tariqa. In this surau, many religious and social activities were performed, such as the daily prayers, study of religion, musyawarah (consensus-based decision making), da'wah (proselytization) and the learning of arts and martial arts. The surau grew rapidly and later became a pesantren (boarding school style Islamic seminary). Burhanuddin received tremendous respect from the people, and the teachings he brought were widely accepted there. Students came to learn both from within the Minangkabau region and outside of it including Riau, Jambi, and Malacca.

Through his boarding school, Burhanuddin taught various Islamic disciplines to his santris (students of pesantren), such as tafsir, hadith, fiqh, aqidah, and others. He also provided da'wah through pengajian (religious studying) to the community. With the effort of Burhanuddin, the teachings of Islam quickly spread in the Minangkabau region.

=== Death ===
Burhanuddin died ten years after the establishment of the pesantren. Later, the pesantren continued under the leadership of his son, Sheikh Abdullah Faqih. For his service and struggle to spread Islam in West Sumatra, to this day the tomb of Burhanuddin receives great attention from the pilgrims, especially by the members of Shattari tariqa. According to the local tradition, the pilgrimage is called Basapa, an abbreviation of bersafar bersempar (together with tens of thousands of people), and it is done every Wednesday of 10th Safar in Islamic Calendar.

== See also ==
- Islam in West Sumatra
- Raya Syekh Burhanuddin Mosque
