= El-Shennawi =

el-Shennawi (Arabic: الشناوي, also transliterated as al-Shinnawi) is an Arabic family name, when followed by a sun letter, the l in el assimilates to the initial consonant of the following noun, resulting in a doubled consonant.

== People ==
- Abu'l-Mawahib al-Shinnawi, Muslim scholar
- Kamal el-Shennawi, Egyptian actor
- Tarek El Shennawi, Egyptian film critic
