= Sultana (title) =

Islamic female royal title

Sultana or sultanah (/sʌlˈtɑːnə/; Arabic: سلطانة sulṭāna) is a female royal title, and the feminine form of the word sultan. This term has been officially used for female monarchs in some Islamic states, and historically it was also used for a sultan's consort.

== Nomenclature ==
The term sultana is the feminine form of the word sultan (Arabic: سلطان), an Arabic abstract noun meaning "strength", "authority", "rulership", derived from the verbal noun سلطة sulṭah, meaning "authority" or "power". Later, sultan came to be used as the title of certain rulers who claimed almost full sovereignty in practical terms, albeit without claiming the overall caliphate, or to refer to a powerful governor of a province within the caliphate.

== Usage ==
=== Ruling sultana ===
Some Muslim female monarchs chose to adopt the title of Sultana/Sultanah when they ascended to the throne.

==== Africa ====
In Comoros, there have been several ruling sultanas.

Shajar al-Durr became the ruling sultana of Egypt in May 1250, founding the Mamluk Sultanate.

==== South Asia ====
Razia Sultana (r. 1236–1240) was a ruler of the Delhi Sultanate in the northern part of the Indian subcontinent. She was the first female Muslim ruler of the Indian Subcontinent.

In the Maldives, there have been six ruling sultanas:

- Khadijah (1347–1363, 1364–1374, 1376–1380)
- Raadhafathi (1380)
- Dhaain (1383–1388)
- Kuda Kala Kamanafa’anu (1607–1609)
- Amina I (1753–1754)
- Amina II (1757–1759)

==== Southeast Asia ====
Nur ul-Azam became the female sultan in Sultanate of Sulu.

In Samudera Pasai Sultanate (now part of Indonesia), Sultanah Nahrasiyah (r. 1406–1428) became the sole ruler.

Of the six female monarchs in Bone state (now part of Indonesia), three used the title sultana.

In Aceh Darussalam (now part of Indonesia), there have been four ruling sultanas:

- Sultana Seri Ratu Ta'jul Alam Syafiatuddin Syah of Aceh (1641–1675) was the daughter of Sultan Iskandar Muda, and wife of Sultan Iskandar Tani. She spoke 6 languages, Acehnese, Malay, Spanish, Dutch, Arabic, and Persian.
- Sultana Seri Ratu Nurul Alam Naqiatuddin Syah (1675–1678).
- Sultana Seri Ratu Zakiatuddin Inayat Syah (1678–1688).
- Sultana Seri Ratu Kamalat Syah (1688–1699). Replaced by her husband, under pressure from the Mufti of Mecca.

In Sumbawa Sultanate (now part of Indonesia), there have been two ruling sultanas:

- Sultanah Siti Aisyah (reigned 1759–1761)
- Sultanah Shafiyatuddin (reigned 1791–1795)

On 5 May 2015, Sultan Yogyakarta and governor of the Special Region of Yogyakarta in Indonesia Hamengkubuwono X, who only has daughters, appointed his eldest child, Lady Nurmalitasari, as his heiress presumptive, henceforth titled Princess Mangkubumi. If she does succeed her father, she will become the first Javanese woman to become a Sultana in her own right.

==== West Asia ====
Sati Beg, a 14th-century Ilkhanid princess, issued coins using the title sultan or sultana.

=== Sultana consort ===
Sultana is also used for sultan's wives. Between 1914 and 1922, monarchs of the Muhammad Ali Dynasty used the title of Sultan of Egypt, and their wives were legally styled as sultanas. Two women held the title of sultana during the short-lived Sultanate of Egypt: Melek Tourhan, the wife of Sultan Hussein Kamel, and Nazli Sabri, the wife of Sultan Fuad I. Nazli Sabri became queen (malika) following the establishment of the Kingdom of Egypt in 1922, and it is with the latter title that she is almost always associated. Melek Tourhan, on the other hand, legally retained the title of sultana even after Egypt became a kingdom, and is often referred to simply as Sultana Melek.

Sultana is also title for consort of ruler in some Malaysian states. Some consorts who hold this title are:

- Sultanah Kalsom, second wife of Ahmad Shah of Pahang. She became Sultanah of Pahang on 30 September 1992 until 15 August 2019.
- Sultanah Nur Zahirah, consort of Mizan Zainal Abidin of Terengganu. She became Sultanah of Terengganu on 5 June 2006.
- Sultanah Haminah, second wife of Abdul Halim of Kedah. She succeeded as Sultanah of Kedah after her predecessor's death on 21 November 2003 until 11 September 2017.
- Sultanah Maliha, consort of Sallehuddin of Kedah. She became Sultanah of Kedah on 12 September 2017 after her husband was proclaimed as the Sultan of Kedah.
- Sultanah Nur Diana Petra, consort of Muhammad V of Kelantan. She married with the Sultan of Kelantan on 30 October 2010 and officially proclaimed the title Sultanah of Kelantan by her husband on 2 August 2022.

== Claim ==
In the west, the title of sultana is also used to refer to many female Muslim monarchs who don't hold this title officially.

In medieval Egypt, Shajar al-Durr, a former slave of Turkic or Armenian origin, ascended the throne in 1250. Although several sources assert that she took the title of sultana, The Cambridge History of Islam disputes the claim, stating that "a feminine form, sultana, does not exist in Arabic: the title sulṭān appears on Shajar al-Durr's only extant coin."

Raziya al-Din, usually referred to in history as Razia Sultana, was the Sultan of Delhi in India from 1236 to May 1240. Like some other princesses of the time, she was trained to lead armies and administer kingdoms if necessary. She was the first female ruler of the Delhi Sultanate. She refused to be addressed as Sultana because it meant "wife or consort of a Sultan" and would answer only to the title "Sultan." Like Shajar al-Durr, Raziya was also often referred as sultana by westerners, very possibly to distinguish her from male sultans.

Sultana was also often used to refer to women relatives of a sultan and other Muslim monarch or female members of Muslim dynasties, especially mothers and chief wives. In fact, many sultanates used other title for sultan's chief consort, some of which derived from non-Arabic languages.

Permaisuri, a title for a chief wife of a sultan in many sultanates and Muslim kingdoms in southeast Asia, is derived from Tamil பரமேஸ்வரி (paramēsvari), from Sanskrit परमेश्वरी (parameśvarī), 'supreme lady'. This title is still used for the consort of Yang di-Pertuan Agong, monarch and head of state of Malaysia. The formal way of addressing her is Raja Permaisuri Agong.

In Brunei, official title for a chief wife of the sultan is Seri Baginda Raja Isteri, derived from Sanskrit raja (राजा, equivalent with "king") and isteri (equivalent with "women" or "lady"). The official title for sultan's mother is Seri Suri Begawan Raja Isteri.

Shahbanu, title for the wife of Iran's monarch, is derived from Persian shah (شاه, equivalent with "king") and banu (بانو, translated as "lady"). Upon assuming the title in 1967, Farah Pahlavi, the third wife of Mohammad Reza Pahlavi, was the first shahbanu to be crowned in Iran since the Arab conquest of Iran in the 7th century. Shahbanu often translated in English as "empress".

Some Muslim monarchs also used the title malika (Arabic: ملكة), a feminine form of the word malik, for their wives. This title is still used in many Muslim kingdoms, like Hashemite Kingdom of Jordan.

=== Ottoman royalty ===
Since 16th century, Ottoman used the title sultan for imperial princesses after their given names (e.g. Mihrimah Sultan and Hatice Sultan). They were all non-ruling royalty; in the western sense, princesses, not queens or empresses. The monarch's mother, who had more power, had the title Valide sultan (e.g. Hafsa Sultan). She was referred to by this title alone, without her given name. Principal consort had the title Haseki Sultan (e.g. Hürrem Sultan). Non-principal consorts had the title hatun, equivalent to lady. This usage underlines the Ottoman conception of sovereign power as family prerogative. Nevertheless, westerners often translated their official title, sultan, to sultana, possibly to distinguish them from the Ottoman ruler.

== See also ==
- Valide sultan
- Sultan
- Queen regnant
- Queen consort
- Al-hurra
