= Perkasa Alam Syarif Lamtui =

Badrul Alam Syarif Lamtui Jamalullail بدر العالم شريف لمتوي جمال الليل
- Sultan
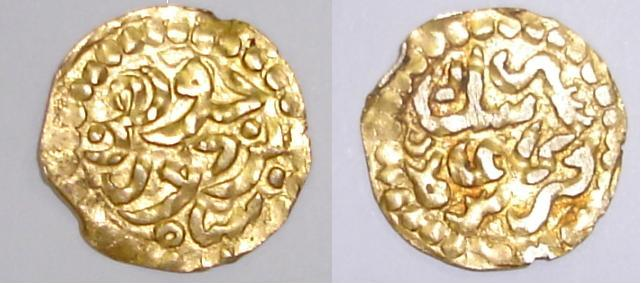
- Coin of Aceh from the era of Sultan Perkasa Alam Syarif Lamtui.

Sultan of Aceh Sultanate
- Reign: 1702 – 1703
- Predecessor: Badr ul-Alam Syarif Hasyim Jamaluddin
- Successor: Jamal ul-Alam Badr ul-Munir
- Born: Banda Aceh, Aceh Sultanate
- Died: Banda Aceh, Aceh Sultanate
- Dynasty: Jamal ul-Lail
- Father: Syarif Ibrahim Jamal ul-Lail
- Religion: Islam

Perkasa Alam Syarif Lamtui or Badr ul-Alam Syarif Lamtui ul-Mutaawi Jamal ul-Lail (died after 1712) was the nineteenth sultan of Aceh in northern Sumatra and ruled briefly in 1702–1703.

Perkasa Alam was the son of an Arab of sayyid ancestry, Ibrahim Jamal ul-Lail. A somewhat doubtful source mentions him as the nephew of a previous ruler, Sultana Kamalat Syah (r. 1688–1699). When his older brother Badr ul-Alam Syarif Hasyim Jamaluddin abdicated in 1702 a short interregnum followed. It was only after Badr ul-Alam's death in the same year that the parties agreed to enthrone Perkasa Alam.

He was not long on the throne, however. In order to improve the financial position of the court he introduced new taxes and reimposed duties on British traders. The Britons present in Aceh asked for exemption which was refused. British ships then blockaded the port and fired on villages situated at the estuary of the Aceh River. Meanwhile the orang kayas (grandees) and uleëbalangs (chiefs) were dissatisfied with the new levies imposed on the land. Taking advantage of the beleaguered situation of Perkasa Alam they launched a revolt. A son of his predecessor, Alauddin, secured his deposition in June 1703. Two months later he ascended the throne under the title Jamal ul-Alam Badr ul-Munir. Perkasa Alam later stayed in the village Pasanga on the east coast of Aceh. In 1712 he was attacked and expelled by 7,000 troops dispatched by Jamal ul-Alam Badr ul-Munir. He was eventually captured in Tranigain and seems to have been kept in captivity by the new ruler.

== Literature ==
- Coolhaas, W.P., ed. (1976) Generale missiven van Gouverneurs-Generaal en Raden aan Heren XVII der Verenigde Oostindische Compagnie, Deel VI: 1698–1713. 's-Gravenhage: M. Nijhoff.
- Crecelius, D. and Beardow, E.A. (1979) 'A Reputed Acehnese Sarakata of the Jamal al-La'il Dynasty', Journal of the Malaysian Branch of the Royal Asiatic Society 52, pp. 51–66.
- Djajadiningrat, Raden Hoesein (1911) 'Critische overzicht van de in Maleische werken vervatte gegevens over de geschiedenis van het soeltanaat van Atjeh', Bijdragen tot de Taal-, Land- en Volkenkunde 65, pp. 135-265.
- Lee Kam Hing (1995) The Sultanate of Aceh: Relations with the British, 1760–1824. Kuala Lumpur: Oxford University Press.

Preceded by Badr ul-Alam Syarif Hasyim Jamaluddin	Sultan of Aceh Sultanate; 1702 – 1703	Succeeded by Jamal ul-Alam Badr ul-Munir
