= Inayat Zakiatuddin Syah =

Zaqiatuddin Inayat Syah زاكية الدين عناية شاه
- Sultanah
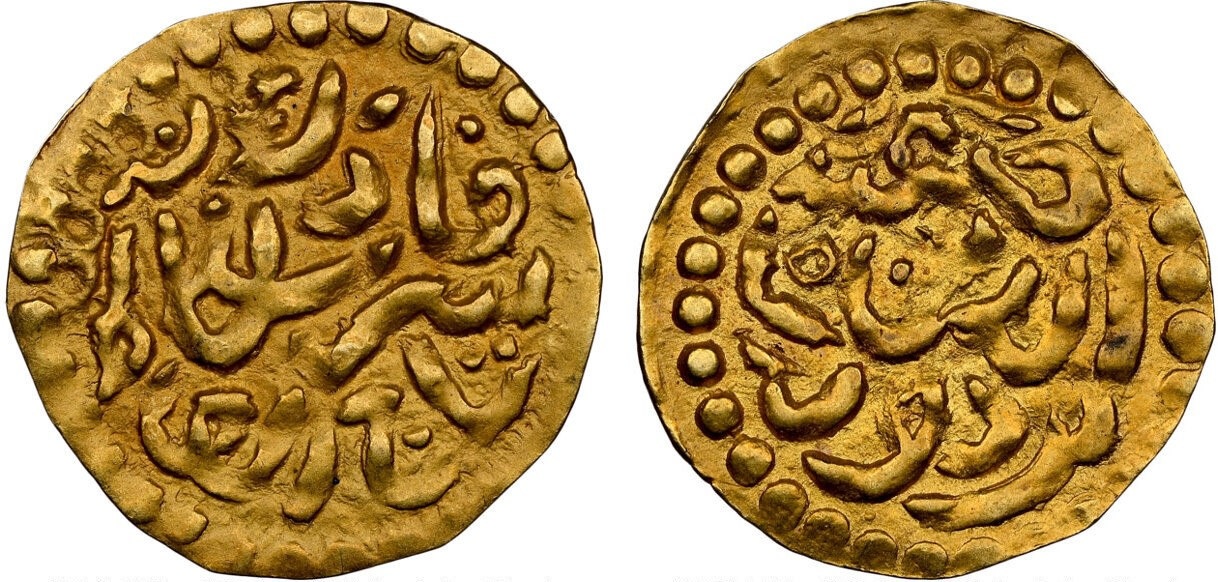
- Coin of Aceh from the era of Sultanah (Queen) Inayat Zakiatudin Syah.

Sultana of Aceh Darussalam
- Reign: 23 January 1678 – 3 October 1688
- Predecessor: Nurul Alam Naqiatuddin Syah
- Successor: Zainatuddin Kamalat Syah
- Born: Puteri Raja Setia; Banda Aceh, Aceh Sultanate
- Died: 3 October 1688; Banda Aceh, Aceh Sultanate
- Father: Sultan Muhamed Syah
- Mother: Nurul Alam Naqiatuddin Syah
- Religion: Islam

Sultana Inayat Zakiatudin Syah (c. 1645 – 3 October 1688) was the sixteenth monarch of the Aceh Darussalam and the third sulṭāna regnant to rule in succession. Her reign lasted from 1678 to 1688 and was generally peaceful.

== Background and enthronement ==
Her original name was Puteri Raja Setia. There are conflicting versions about her family background, which is not revealed by contemporary archival sources. According to the relatively reliable chronicle Bustanus Salatin, she was the daughter of an otherwise unknown Sultan Muhamed Syah. Three minor chronicles assert that she was the daughter of her predecessor Nurul Alam Naqiatuddin Syah. A third source, a manuscript from Universiti Kebangsaan Malaysia, says that her father was Malik Radliat Syah, son of Sultan Firman Ali Ri'ayat Syah, son of Sultan Alauddin Ri'ayat Syah Sayyid al-Mukammal. The English sea captain William Dampier visited Aceh during her reign and wrote: "the queen of Achin as it is said, is always an old maid chosen out of the Royal family". When the old queen Nurul Alam died in January 1678, Puteri Raja Setia was enthroned under the name Sultanah Inayat Zakiatuddin Syah without any known commotion. According to an English travel account from 1684, she was around 40 years old, large with a powerful voice. The visitors even speculated that she was no real woman but actually a eunuch in disguise.

== Communication with visitors ==
Like the first sultana, Taj ul-Alam, Inayat had cultural interests and supported the well-known Islamic scholar Abdul Ra'uf of Singkel. At least one of his works, a commentary on Nawawi's hadiths, was commissioned by the queen. In 1683 she was visited by an embassy from the sharif of Mecca which reached Aceh after failing to contact the Mughal Emperor Aurangzeb. English envoys from Madras arrived in 1684 and asked for permission to establish a trading post. They had bought Acehnese pepper since long and searched for new posts on Banten after Java had been closed to them in 1682 by Amangkurat II of Mataram. At this time the council of the queen consisted of twelve orang kayas (lit. rich men) who received the Europeans in a friendly manner. The Englishmen pointed out that a fortified post would deter the Dutch East India Company from enforcing a blockade on the Acehnese coast. Still the proposal was not approved by the court. The English observed that Aceh had become a popular port for Indian traders, Madras residents and adventurers in the past decade.

Sultana Inayat died on 3 October 1688. Her death was followed by a brief spate of infighting among the orang kayas before a fourth (and last) sultana was enthroned, Sultana Kamalat Syah.

== Literature ==
- Djajadiningrat, Raden Hoesein (1911). "Critisch overzicht van de in Maleische werken vervatte gegevens over de geschiedenis van het soeltanaat van Atjeh". Bijdragen tot de Taal-, Land- en Volkenkunde (in Dutch). 65 (1/2): 135–265. doi:10.1163/22134379-90001836. JSTOR 20769622.
- Stibbe, D.G.; Spat, C., eds. (1917). Encyclopaedie van Nederlandsch-Indië (in Dutch). Vol. 1. 's-Gravenhage & Leiden: Martinus Nijhoff & Brill Publishers. hdl:1887.1/item:181627.
- Hasjmy, A. (1977). 59 tahun Aceh merdeka dibawah pemerintahan ratu (PDF) (in Indonesian). Jakarta: Bulan Bintan.
- Khan, Sher Banu (2009). Rule Behind the Silk Curtain: The Sultanahs of Aceh, 1641-1699 (PhD thesis). University of London.
- Khan, Sher Banu (2010). "The Sultanahs of Aceh, 1641–99". In Graf, Arndt; Schroter, Susanne; Wieringa, Edwin (eds.). Aceh: History, Politics and Culture. Singapore: ISEAS Publishing. pp. 3–25. doi:10.1355/9789814279130-004.
- Ricklefs, Merle C. (1994). A History of Modern Indonesia Since c. 1300 (2nd ed.). Stanford: Stanford University Press. pp. 35–36, 51.

Preceded by Nurul Alam Naqiatuddin Syah	Sultana of Aceh Sultanate; 23 January 1678 – 3 October 1688	Succeeded by Kamalat Syah
