= Qazi family of Lakhnauti =

Qazi family of Lakhnauti লখনৌতির কাজী খান্দান
- Country: Bengal
- Current region: Lakhnauti
- Etymology: Qadi
- Origin: Balkh
- Founded: 15th century
- Founder: Taj ad-Din an-Nahwi
- Members: Shah Manjhan
- Traditions: Shattari Order
- Arabic name
- Toponymic (Nisba): al-Lakhnawtawī اللكهنوتوي

The Qazi family of Lakhnauti (Bengali: লখনৌতির কাজী খান্দান) was a medieval Bengali Muslim family who lived in the city of Lakhnauti in the Bengal Sultanate. The family was founded by Taj ad-Din an-Nahwi in the 15th century, and has produced numerous influential judges and scholars. The descendants of Shah Manjhan later moved to Gujarat and neighbouring states.

== Members ==
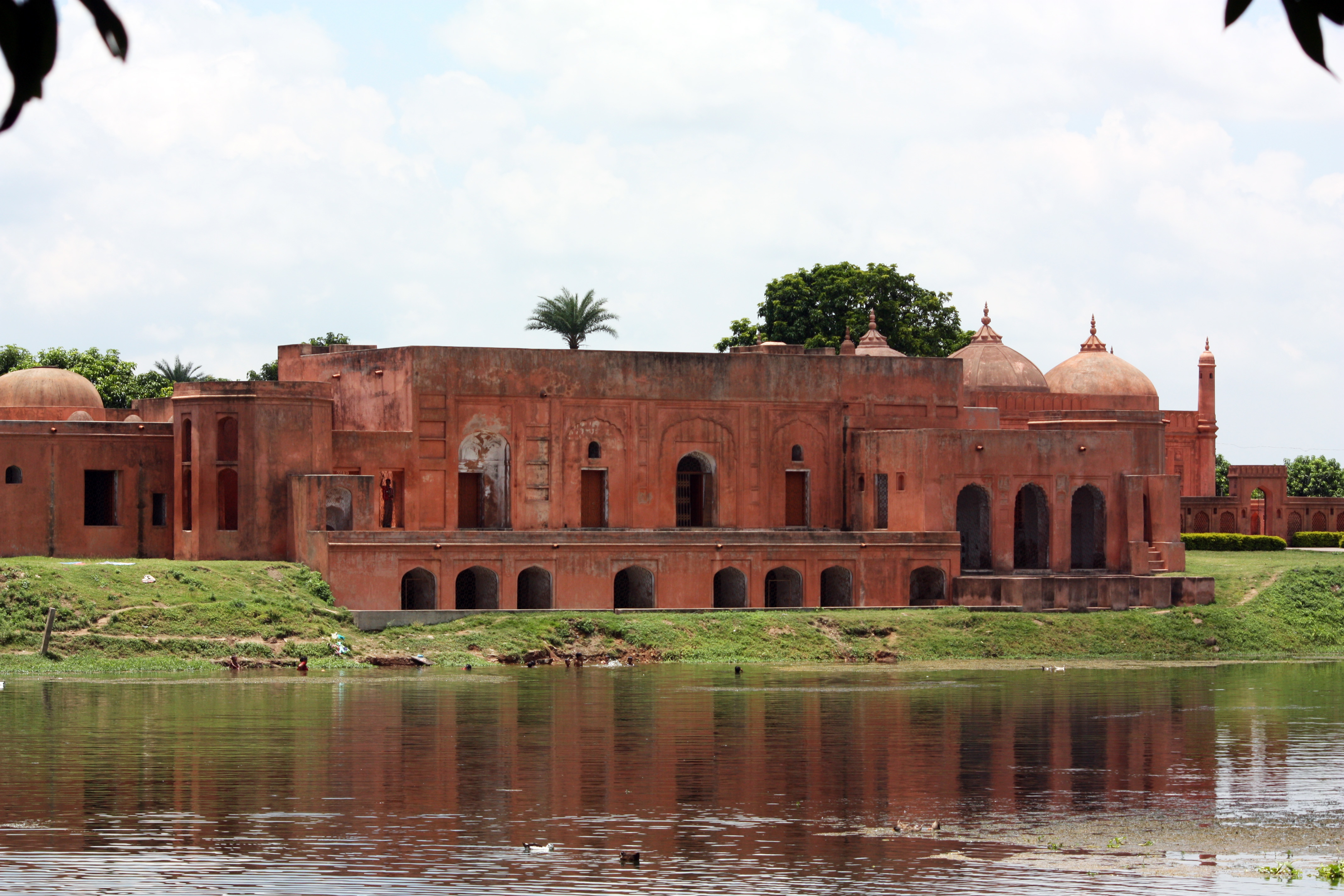
The historic city of Lakhnauti, now in present-day Nawabganj, Bangladesh, was the royal capital of the Sultanate of Bengal and experienced an influx of scholars during this period.

The Qazi family are descended from Taj ad-Din an-Nahwi, who had Arab lineage from his ancestor, Shaykh Mahmud al-Ishqi Randposh. Prior to settling in Lakhnauti, the family was based in Balkh in present-day Afghanistan. In Bengal, it is said that they became the spiritual successors of the family of Nur Qutb Alam of the Chishti Order.

=== Taj ad-Din an-Nahwi ===
Tāj ad-Dīn al-Naḥwī al-Balkhī al-Lakhnawtawī was a 15th-century Islamic scholar, qadi and grammarian of the Arabic language. According to Abd al-Hayy al-Lucknawi, he was one of the leading scholars in the fields of grammar and Arabic language during his time. He was born into a Sunni Muslim family in Balkh, Afghanistan, then part of the Timurid Empire, where he was raised. He was famed by the epithet al-naḥwī ('the grammarian') and khulāṣah al-ʿulamāʾ ('epitome of the ulama'), and had a famous khanqah in Balkh. It is said that he left Balkh, after hearing of the scholarly patronage of Sultan Ibrahim Shah Sharqi (r. 1402–1440). However, Taj ad-Din ended up settling in the neighbouring Sultanate of Bengal instead. He benefitted many students in Lakhnauti and the family established themselves there.

=== Shah Manjhan ===
Shah Manjhan al-Lakhnawtawī (d. Rabi' al-Awwal 1001 AH / 1592 CE) was a prominent 16th-century Sufi saint and leading figure of the Shattari Order. He was the son of Abdullah, son of Khayr ad-Dīn al-Lakhnawtawī, who was a direct descendant of Taj ad-Din an-Nahwi. From his mother's side, Shah Manjhan was a descendant of Qadi Samāʾ ad-Din of Delhi. Manjhan was born and raised in Lakhnauti, and initially studied under Shaykh Ahmadi. He then became a murid of Shaykh Taj ad-Din al-Husayni al-Bukhari for a long time. He dedicated much of his time in Lakhnauti towards teaching the Islamic sciences. Taj ad-Din al-Bukhari eventually instructed Manjhan to become a disciple of Muhammad Ghawth, the Sufi master of the Shattari Order in Gujarat. After the Conquest of Malwa by Sher Shah Suri, Manjhan moved there as he was appointed as the religious administrator of the newly conquered fort-town of Raisen. Due to political instability, he later relocated to Sarangpur, settling in the village of Ashnah, where he wrote several works on the Islamic sciences and was received by Emperor Akbar. His son, Uthman, was a leading scholar in Islamic jurisprudence and Arabic language.

== Bibliography ==
- al-Lucknawi, Abd al-Hayy (1999). Nuzhat al-khawatir (in Arabic). Beirut, Lebanon: Dar Ibn Hazm.
