= Abdullah Shattar =

Sufi saint

Siraj al-Din Abdullah Shattar (Arabic: سراج الدين عبد الله الشطار) was a prominent 15th-century Sufi master, considered to be the eponymous founder of the Shattariyya order.

== Life ==
He brought his sufism order from Transoxiana to South Asian subcontinent, where his successors developed it further. In the late 16th-century, the order was introduced to the Haramain, and through them to Southeast Asia.

Abdullah studied Sufism according to the Isqiya and Bistamiya traditions, which thrived in Khorasan and Ottoman Turkey. His master gave him the name Shattar, a Persian word of Arabic-origin meaning “lightning”, which designates a code of spiritual practices that lead to a rapid state of “completion”. His learning's chain of transmission was from his master Muhammad Arif, then from Muhammad Ashiq, Khuda Quli, Abu'l Hasan al-Kharqani, Abu'l Muzaffar al-Tusi, Abu Yazid Ishqi, Muhammad al-Maghribi, from Bayazid Bistami.

== Later life and death ==
Abdullah went to India to promote his order and visited many Sufi groups to introduce his method. He toured Delhi, Jaunpur, Bihar, Bengal, and Malwa, before settling down in Mandu under the patronage of Sultan Ghiyath al-Din Tughluq. Abdullah continued to stay and propagated his order until he died in India in 1485. Later on, his successors became influential over several Mughal rulers.

== See also ==
- Shattari
- Bayazid Bistami
- List of Sufis
