= Maulana Shahbaz Muhammad =

16th - 17th century Sufi saint and Islamic scholar from Bhagalpur, Bihar

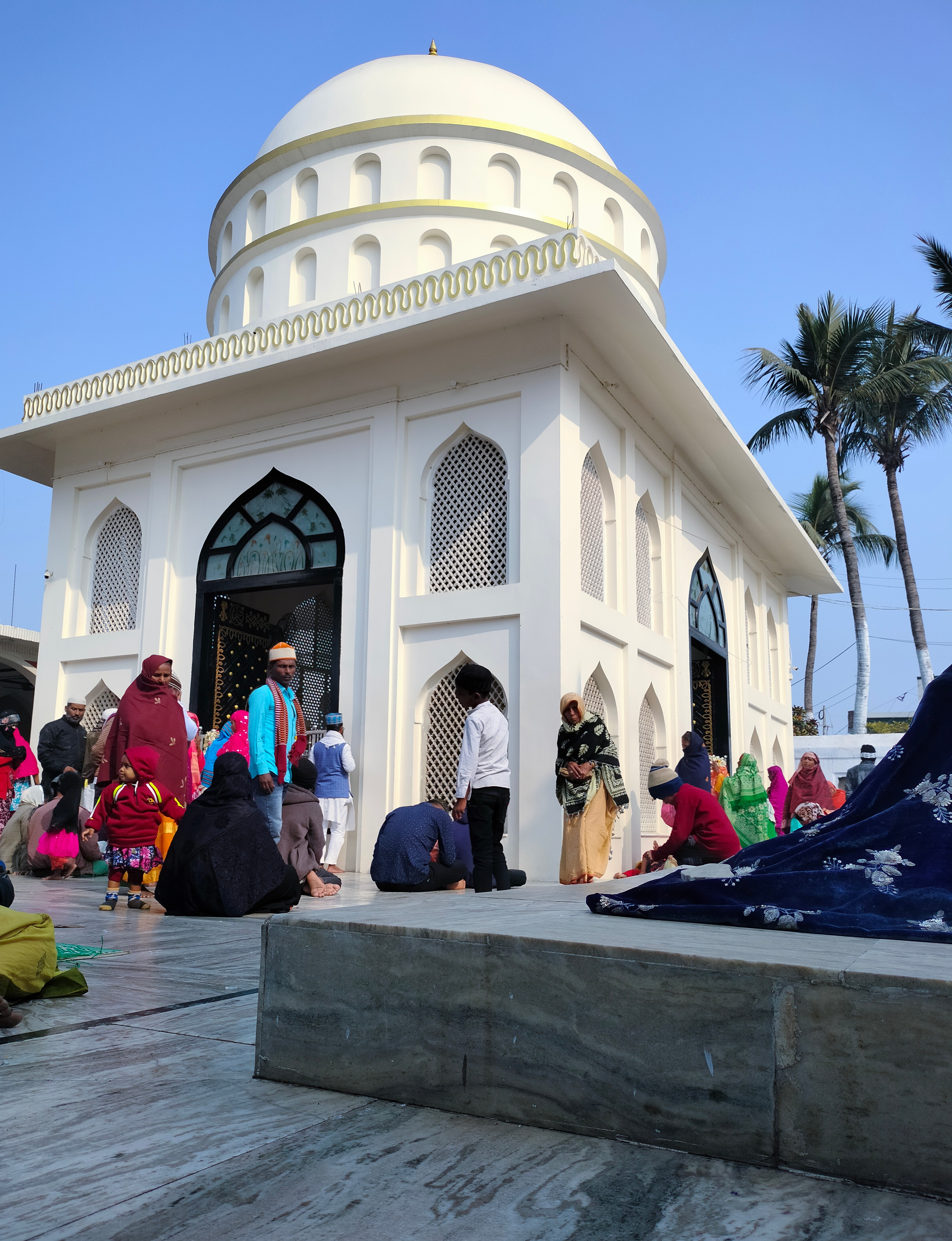
- The shrine (dargah) of Maulana Shahbaz Muhammad at Khanqah-e-Shahbazia in Bhagalpur
- Title: Founder of Khanqah-e-Shahbazia and Madrasa-e-Shahbaz

Personal life
- Born: Shahbaz Muhammad; 956 AH (c. 1549 CE) Deori, Mughal Empire
- Died: 16 Safar 1050 AH (c. June 1640 CE) Bhagalpur, Mughal Empire
- Resting place: Mulla Chak, Bhagalpur, Bihar, India
- Main interest(s): Fiqh, Hadith, Tasawwuf

Religious life
- Religion: Islam
- Order: Shattari, Qadiriyya

Maulana Shahbaz Muhammad (also known as Hazrat Maulana Syed Shahbaz Muhammad Dewariya Bhagalpuri 956 AH – 16 Safar 1050 AH / c. 1549 – 1640 CE) was a prominent 16th–17th century South Asian Sufi saint, Islamic scholar, author, and an authority on shariah law and tradition. Associated with the Shattari and Qadiriyya tradition, he was an active spiritual master whose lineage established the Khanqah-e-Shahbazia astana in Mulla Chak, Bhagalpur. He established the Khanqah-e-Shahbazia and its associated Islamic seminary, Madrasa-e-Shahbaz, in Bhagalpur, institutions that remain active as centers for spiritual and educational life.

== Early life and education ==
Maulana Shahbaz Muhammad was born in 956 AH (c. 1549 CE) in Deori during the reign of the Suri dynasty. His father was Maulana Syed Shah Muhammad Khattab and his grandfather was Haji Khairuddin, whose family originally migrated from Bukhara. His ancestral lineage traces back 25 generations to Husayn ibn Ali, the grandson of the Islamic prophet Muhammad.

His early education in traditional Islamic sciences, encompassing both outward (zahir) and inward (batin) disciplines, was completed under his father's guidance.

In 970 AH, he journeyed to Hijaz for further knowledge, reaching Makkah Sharif where he studied Hadith for 3 years under Imam Shihabuddin Ahmad ibn Hajar Al-Haytami Al-Makki and received Sanad-e-Hadith. Following his family's relocation, Maulana Shahbaz Muhammad settled in Bhagalpur around 986 AH.

== Educational institution and legacy ==
Located in the Mulla Chak neighborhood of Bhagalpur, an area traditionally believed to have been named after him, the Khanqah-e-Shahbazia and Madrasa-e-Shahbaz complex grew into a vital institution for educational and religious life in medieval North Bihar, continuing to operate in the modern era as an active center for Islamic learning. According to family tradition recorded in a 2026 interview, Maulana Shahbaz Muhammad personally declined an invitation to meet Shah Jahan and refused the emperor's offer of land, a later generation of the family accepted comparable grants roughly a century afterward. The madrasa itself continued to be supported through imperial revenue-free land grants madad-i-maash under Mughal administrative regulations, with official correspondence and farmans issued to the institution under standard bureaucratic protocols.

Maulana Shahbaz Muhammad's educational and spiritual network extended across Bihar and Bengal, encompassing notable disciples such as Darwish Muhammad (teacher and mentor to Sheikh Muhammad Afdal al-Ilahabadi), Chandan Shahid of Midnapore, and Maulana Khwaja Ali of Teghra during the reign of Mughal Emperor Shah Jahan. Beyond his institutional footprint, he was recognized as an authority on Islamic law and tradition during the reigns of Shah Jahan and Aurangzeb, when scholars in Delhi disagreed on points of religious law, his opinion was sought to help settle the matter.

In addition to his juridical and administrative stature, Maulana Shahbaz Muhammad authored Sittin Sharif, an Arabic text focused on Islamic exhortations and prophetic traditions, which was later translated into Urdu and published by Dr. Abdul Ghaffar Ansari, Head of the Persian Department at T.N.B. College, Bhagalpur. Furthermore, scholarship by academic Kelly Pemberton highlights the tradition's distinctive legacy of recognizing female initiation and spiritual lineage, explicitly incorporating women into its chain of spiritual succession shajra and spiritual authority.

== Spiritual lineage (Shajra-e-Tareeqat) ==
Maulana Shahbaz Muhammad received primary spiritual authorization ijazah from Mir Yasin Siwani of Munger. He was authorized to guide disciples across several Sufi orders silsilas, primarily the Shattari and Qadiriyya, as well as the Tayfuriyya, Uwaysiyya, Idrisiyya, Nizamiyya, Suhrawardiyya, and Chishtiyya orders.

His primary lineage in the Shattari - Qadiri tradition is traced as follows:

Muhammad
→ Ali ibn Abi Talib
→ Husayn ibn Ali
→ (several generations)
→ Junayd al-Baghdadi
→ (several generations)
→ Abdul Qadir al-Jilani (Ghaus-e-Pak)
→ (several generations)
→ Shaykh Muhammad Ghaus Gwaliori
→ Wajihuddin Alvi
→ Mir Yasin Siwani
→ Maulana Shahbaz Muhammad

== Succession and lineage ==
Following Maulana Shahbaz Muhammad's passing, leadership at the Khanqah-e-Shahbazia in Bhagalpur was carried forward through his son, Maulana Abdul Salam, and his direct descendants as (sajjada nashins), currently guided by Syed Shah Intekhab Alam Shahbazi.

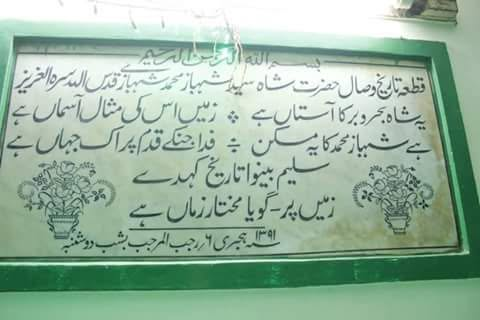
Memorial plaque at the shrine of Shah Syed Shahbaz Mohammad Shahbazi, a descendant of Maulana Shahbaz Muhammad, in the Begum Bazar graveyard, Nawab Bari, Old Dhaka

The family lineage also branched out through his great-grandson, Maulana Shah Najeebullah, who extended the spiritual tradition into East Bengal by establishing a thriving regional branch. This branch ultimately settled in Dhaka.

According to a 2026 MonnonRekha interview, the family relocated to Dhaka from Bhagalpur and resided in Nawab Bari until 1986, when commercial redevelopment of the area and the government's acquisition of Ahsan Manzil led the family to leave. Saiyed Hussain Shahbazi has led the Shahbazi silsila since 1983 and is based at the family's Baghe-e-Shahbaz residence in Moghbazar. The lineage's original grave mazar is in Nawab Bari graveyard (Begum Bazar) in Old Dhaka, where weekly milad is held, while the annual urs is observed at a khanqah in Rupganj.

== Death, shrine, and annual Urs observances ==
Maulana Shahbaz Muhammad died at the age of 94 in Islamic lunar years on 16 Safar 1050 AH (c. June 1640 CE) during the reign of Mughal Emperor Shah Jahan. He was buried in Bhagalpur, where his shrine dargah in Mulla Chak remains an active center.

The annual three-day Urs festival is celebrated at the Khanqah-e-Shahbazia complex under the guidance of the hereditary Sajjada Nashin. The commemorations include ceremonial flag-hoisting (jhandottolan), Quranic recitations, traditional sheet-offering rituals (chadarposhi), and a spiritual assembly (mehfil-e-sama), drawing attendees from across India and neighboring countries such as Nepal and Bangladesh.

== See also ==
- Sufism in India
- Shattari
- Qadiriyya
- Bhagalpur
- Ibn Hajar al-Haytami
