= Syekh Burhanuddin Grand Mosque =

Mosque in Padang Pariaman, West Sumatra, Indonesia

Syekh Burhanuddin Grand Mosque Masjid Raya Syekh Burhanuddin
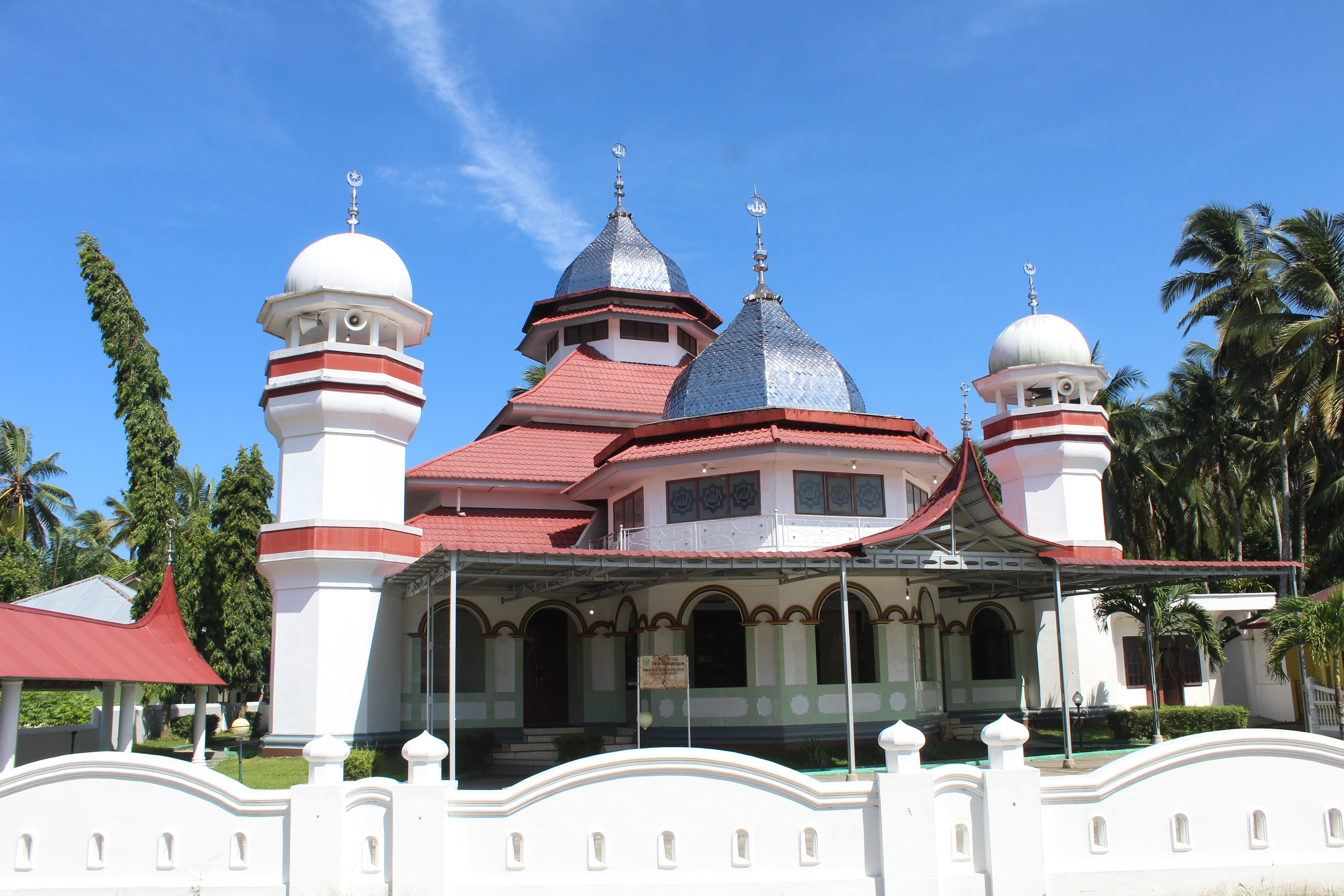

Religion
- Affiliation: Islam
- Branch/tradition: Sunni

Location
- Location: Ulakan Tapakis, Padang Pariaman, West Sumatra, Indonesia
- Interactive map of Syekh Burhanuddin Grand Mosque; Masjid Raya Syekh Burhanuddin

Architecture
- Type: Mosque
- Style: Minangkabau
- Groundbreaking: 1670; 356 years ago

Specifications
- Capacity: 3,000 pilgrims
- Minaret: 2

The Syekh Burhanuddin Grand Mosque (Indonesian: Masjid Raya Syekh Burhanuddin) is one of the oldest mosques as well as a cultural heritage in West Sumatra, Indonesia. The mosque is located in Nagari Ulakan, Ulakan Tapakis sub-district, Padang Pariaman district of West Sumatra.

== History ==
The mosque was built by Burhanuddin Ulakan in 1670, making it one of the oldest mosques in Indonesia. When the mosque was built, the building was very simple, with a size of 15 by 15 meters (49 ft × 49 ft) and made of wood. The mosque was renovated for the first time in 1760 due to improper building conditions. The mosque was destroyed by the 2009 Sumatra earthquake. It was then rebuilt and completed in 2011.

== Architecture ==
The mosque stands on 55-by-70-meter (180 ft × 230 ft) plot of land. The building is square shaped and has area of 40 by 40 meters (130 ft × 130 ft) with 3-by-40-meter (9.8 ft × 131.2 ft) size terrace and able to accommodate about 3,000 pilgrims. This mosque has two minarets on both sides. In addition to being designed as a place of worship, this mosque is also prepared as a place for evacuation in the event of tsunami.
