= Abdullah II of the Maldives =

Sultan of the Maldives in 1377

Sultan Abdullah II Sri suvama Abaarana Mahaa radun was the prince consort turned Sultan of the Maldives in 1388. He forced his wife, sultana Dhaain to abdicate, but ruled the country for only 1 month.

| Preceded by Dhaain | Sultan of the Maldives; 1377 | Succeeded by Osman I |
