= Ibrahim al-Kurani =

17th-century Kurdish Islamic scholar and theologian

Ibrāhīm al-Kūrānī

Personal life
- Born: Burhān al-Dīn Ibrāhīm ibn Ḥasan; 1616 Shehraneh; Safavid Iran
- Died: 1690 (aged 73–74) Medina; Ottoman Empire
- Spouse: Daughter of Ahmad al-Qushashi (before 1690)
- Children: Abu Tahir al-Kurani
- Era: Early modern period
- Region: West Asia
- Main interest(s): Sufism, Tawhid, Islamic jurisprudence

Religious life
- Religion: Islam
- Denomination: Sunni (Sufi)
- Jurisprudence: Shāfiʿī
- Creed: Atharī (formerly Akhbari)

Muslim leader
- Disciple of: Ahmad al-Qushashi
- Influenced by: Ibn Arabi, Abd al-Karim al-Jili, Ibn Taymiyya, Abu al-Hasan al-Ash'ari
- Influenced: Abd al-Rauf al-Fansuri, Yusuf al-Makassari, Muhammad Hayyat al-Sindi

Burhān al-Dīn Ibrāhīm ibn Ḥasan al-Kūrānī (1616–1690) better known as Ibrāhīm al-Kūrānī, was a 17th-century Kurdish Islamic scholar and theologian of the Shafi'i school of thought. As a theologian, he was a former proponent of Wahdat al-Wujud before his adherence to Atharism. He was also the teacher of Abd al-Rauf al-Fansuri, a prominent ulama of Aceh, and Yusuf al-Makassari, who spread Islam in South Africa.

== Biography ==
Burhān al-Dīn Ibrāhīm ibn Ḥasan al-Kūrānī was born in the year 1616. He was of Kurdish descent, with his eptithet al-Shahrānī indicating that he was from the Kurdish-dominated village of Shehrāneh in Safavid Iran. In his adulthood, Al-Kurani went on a journey throughout the Middle East and the Levant to seek knowledge as well as study the Islamic religion.

In Egypt, Al-Kurani was a student at the Al-Azhar University in Cairo for three months in 1650. There, he studied the book Al-Taysīr fī al-Qirāʾāt al-Sab. In Syria, he studied under Abd al-Baqi al-Hanbali, a leading authority of the Hanbali school, where he also memorized the Sahih of Muhammad ibn Ismail al-Bukhari. After he had received his ijazah for becoming an Islamic scholar, he migrated to Medina in 1652, where he stayed for the rest of his life. He became a disciple of Ahmad al-Qushashi, a murshid, who initiated him into the Shattari order of Sufism and gave him his daughter in marriage. Al-Kurani was later initiated into the Naqshbandi order as well, following his vision that one could be initiated into multiple orders without conflict. He was also employed as an Imam at the Prophet's Mosque, where he gave sermons and taught students.

A majority of students under Al-Kurani's entourage were from Southeast Asia, especially from places that are now Indonesia and Malaysia, including the wider Nusantara. Abd al-Rauf al-Fansuri, a student of Al-Kurani, maintained a close and friendly relationship with him, spreading his manner of teaching to Aceh. Another student of his from Nusantara was Yusuf al-Makassari, who was best known for establishing Islam in the Cape Town. Al-Kurani's son Abu Tahir also studied under his father and later became the teacher of Muhammad Hayyat al-Sindhi, an Indian Muslim scholar who was the teacher of Muhammad ibn Abd al-Wahhab, the founder of Wahhabism. He also dedicated a treatise for answering questions from the Malay Peninsula relating to jurisprudence and creed. Due to his entourage of Nusantaran students, Al-Kurani is a celebrated figure in Indonesia and Malaysia.

Al-Kurani passed away in 1690 and was buried in the Jannat al-Baqi cemetery of Medina.

== Views ==
=== Fiqh (jurisprudence) ===
Ibrahim al-Kurani adhered to the Shafi'i school of thought, which was the dominant school in the places he studied at, such as in Syria and at the Al-Azhar institution in Cairo, Egypt. However, had an ijazah to teach Hanbali fiqh as well in Medina, and was sometimes regarded as a Hanbali himself.

=== Sufism ===
Ibrahim al-Kurani was a supporter of Sufism and other forms of Islamic mysticism. He delved into the teachings of Ibn Arabi and Abd al-Karim al-Jilli, encouraging one to follow the views of both Sufi scholars instead of one of them. Al-Kurani was also initiated into the Shattari and Naqshbandi orders of Sufism in Medina. He emphasized the importance of not following one path to God, but the compatibility of following as many paths that could lead one closer to God without deviations. He also obligated that a Sufi may do as he pleases to draw closer to God, as long as he does not contradict what is said in the Qur'an and Sunnah.

=== Aqeeda (Creed and theology) ===
Ibrahim al-Kurani considered Atharism to be the standard theological doctrine of the Islamic religion. He was also a former proponent of Akhbarism, including concepts such as Wahdat al-Wujud. He was a supporter of Ibn Taymiyyah, defending him in terms of creed and theology.

Ibrahim al-Kurani had a favourable view of Abu al-Hasan al-Ash'ari, the founder of the Ash'ari school of theology, claiming to have followed his book al-Ibānah 'an Uşūl ad-Diyānah in terms of theology. However, the work al-Ibānah is heavily criticized by Ash'ari scholars, who believe that the work is falsely attributed to Abu al-Hasan because of its contents, which are clearly Hanbali influenced and not adhering to the proper Ash'ari doctrine. Al-Kurani also criticized the Ash'arite doctrine of metaphorically interpreting Qur'anic verses and concepts of tafwid, stating that one should not accept metaphorical interpretations of verses and accept the verses in a literal manner, even if there are anthropomorphic implications. Regarding the Maturidi school, he was indifferent towards them and did criticize them as well although he did assist in uncovering the chain of transmission of the manuscript of Kitāb al-Tawhīd to help with more authentic re-publications of the manuscript. Al-Kurani also attempted to reconcile the theological views of Ash'aris with those of Ibn Taymiyyah.

In 1682, Al-Kurani wrote a treatise, Tanbīh al-ʿUqūl ʿalā Tanzīh al-Ṣūfiyyah ʿan Iʿtiqād al-Tajsīm wa-l-ʿAyniyyah wa-l-Ittiḥād wa-l-Ḥulūl, which defended Ibn Arabi and the theology of Wahdat al-Wujud, refuting misconceptions that the teachings of Ibn Arabi espoused anthropomorphist, pantheist, incarnationist and corporealist ideas.

== Works ==
Al-Kurani had written over three hundred works, most of which do not survive to this day. Among these works include:

- Itḥāf al-dhakī, a treatise for his Nusantaran audience.
- Tanbīh al-ʿUqūl ʿalā Tanzīh al-Ṣūfiyyah ʿan Iʿtiqād al-Tajsīm wa-l-ʿAyniyyah wa-l-Ittiḥād wa-l-Ḥulūl, a treatise that defends Akhbarism from accusations of heresy.

== Criticism ==
His treatise on the Event of Gharānīq was largely criticized by a group of scholars in Algeria and Morocco including Yahya al-Shawi, who wrote and signed a fatwa against Ibrahim al-Kurani and demanded his execution. When the fatwa reached Medina, it was largely ignored, before it was later discarded by Al-Kurani's student Muhammad al-Barzanji, who was serving as the Mufti of Medina at the time. Al-Kurani was also accused of having Mu'tazilite leanings when he explained the faith of Amenhotep III.

== See also ==
- Shattari
- Shafi'i school
- List of Atharis
- List of Sufis
