= Nurul Alam Naqiatuddin Syah =

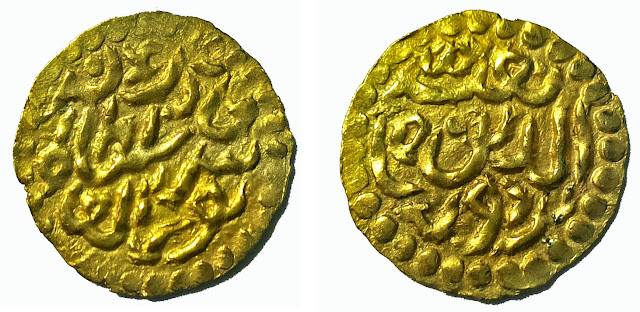
- Coin of Aceh from the era of Sultanah (Queen) Naqiat al-Din Nur al-'Alam.

Sultana of Aceh Sultanate
- Reign: 23 October 1675 – 23 January 1678
- Predecessor: Taj ul-Alam Safiatuddin
- Successor: Inayat Zakiatuddin Syah
- Born: Sri Para Puteri; Banda Aceh, Aceh Sultanate
- Died: 23 January 1678; Banda Aceh, Aceh Sultanate
- Spouse: Sultan Muhammad Syah
- Father: Malik Mahmud Qithul Kahar Syah
- Religion: Islam

Sulṭāna Nurul Alam Naqiatuddin Syah (died 23 January 1678) was the fifteenth ruler of Aceh in northern Sumatra, ruling from 1675 to 1678. She was the second of four queens regnant (sultanas) to rule in succession.

== Origins ==
The previous ruler, Sulṭāna Taj ul-Alam died in October 1675 without children or (known) close relatives. Once again a woman was placed on the throne, namely Sri Para Puteri who took the name Sulṭāna Nurul Alam Naqiatuddin Syah. Contemporary sources give no hint about her relationship with the old sultan's family. According to a manuscript preserved at Universiti Kebangsaan Malaysia, she was the daughter of Malik Mahmud Qithul Kahar Syah, son of Sulayman, son of Abdul Jalil, son of Sultan Alauddin al-Kahar. This would need further verification. It has been argued that the success of the mild reign of Taj ul-Alam encouraged the enthronement of yet another woman. The progress of the age of Iskandar Muda had been achieved at a high cost, being arbitrary and highly coercive. The peaceful rule of the sultanas meant a dismantling of despotism in favour of an institutionalisation of law to protect subjects and foreigners.

== Reign ==
The chronicles attribute the division of Aceh in three sagis (regions) to this queen. The sagis were known as the XXII Mukims, XXVI Mukims, and XXV Mukims after the number of districts (mukim) in each. Most probably the three sagis existed prior to that date. The information might rather be understood as a confirmation of the rights of the uleëbalangs (chiefs) vis-à-vis the court: every royal succession would henceforth have to be approved by the three sagis. Of other events during Nurul Alam's reign, historians only know that the Baiturrahman Grand Mosque and the sultan's palace in Kutaraja were destroyed by a violent conflagration, along with royal heirlooms and treasures.

According to some chronicles (which are not confirmed by contemporary sources) Nurul Alam was the mother of a daughter called Puteri Raja Setia, who succeeded her as queen under the name Sultan Inayat Zakiatuddin Syah. In that case she might have been the spouse of a certain Sultan Muhammad Syah who is mentioned as father of Sultan Inayat in the authoritative chronicle Bustanus Salatin.

== Literature ==
- Djajadiningrat, Raden Hoesein (1911). "Critisch overzicht van de in Maleische werken vervatte gegevens over de geschiedenis van het soeltanaat van Atjeh". Bijdragen tot de Taal-, Land- en Volkenkunde (in Dutch). 65: 135–265. JSTOR 20769622.
- Hasjmy, A. (1977). 59 tahun Aceh merdeka dibawah pemerintahan ratu (PDF) (in Indonesian). Jakarta: Bulan Bintan.
- Khan, Sher Banu (2009). Rule Behind the Silk Curtain: The Sultanahs of Aceh, 1641-1699 (PhD thesis). University of London.

| Preceded by Taj ul-Alam Safiatuddin | Sultana of Aceh; 23 October 1675 – 23 January 1678 | Succeeded by Inayat Zakiatuddin Syah |
