= Badr ul-Alam Syarif Hasyim Jamaluddin =

Sultan of Aceh Datussalam from 1699 to 1702

Badrul Alam Syarif Hasyim Jamaluddin Jamalullail بدر العالم شريف هاشم جمال الدين جمال الليل
- Sultan
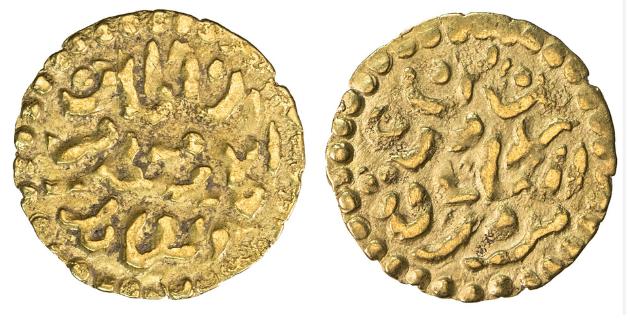
- Coin of Aceh from the era of Sultan Badrul Alam Syarif Hasyim Jamaluddin Jamalullail.

Sultan of Aceh Sultanate
- Reign: 1699 – 1702
- Predecessor: Zainatuddin Kamalat Syah
- Successor: Perkasa Alam Syarif Lamtui
- Born: Banda Aceh, Aceh Sultanate
- Died: 1702 or after 1717; Banda Aceh, Aceh Sultanate
- Issue: Jamal ul-Alam Badr ul-Munir
- Dynasty: Jamal ul-Lail
- Father: Syarif Ibrahim Jamal ul-Lail
- Religion: Sunni Islam

Badr ul-Alam Syarif Hasyim Jamaluddin (died 1702 or after 1717) was the eighteenth Sulṭān of Acèh Darussalam in northern Sumatra. His brief reign (1699–1702) marked a transition to more unsettled conditions in Aceh, as persons not belonging to the old sultan's family tried to rule the kingdom with limited success.

== Dynastic change ==
Aceh was ruled by four sultanas in succession in 1641–1699. Towards the end of the seventeenth century the moderate element among the literati made way for a more orthodox Islamic vogue which demanded the return of a male ruler. A fatwa, ostensibly issued in Mecca, arrived in 1699 and deemed female rule incompatible with the sharia. Badr ul-Alam Syarif Hasyim, an Arab of sayyid descent, then replaced the incumbent sultana Zainatuddin Kamalat Syah and became the eighteenth Sulṭān of Acèh Darussalam. It is sometimes speculated that he was married to his predecessor According to the findings of D. Crecelius and E.A. Beardow, he was the son of Syarif Ibrahim Jamal ul-Lail, and the brother of Badr ul-Alam Zainul Abidin Jamal ul-Lail, Syarifah Salmah, Perkasa Alam Syarif Lamtui, and Sulaiman Jamal ul-Lail. Of these, Badr ul-Alam Zainul Abidin Jamal ul-Lail may have ruled Aceh for seven months in 1699, before the enthronement of Badr ul-Alam.

== Problems of acceptance ==
The Dutch East India Company, which was established on Sumatra's west coast, perceived the new sultan as a potential threat. The garrison in the important port Barus was strengthened in 1700 since "the government is again said to be in the hands of a king with fiery character". Aceh was visited by the Briton Alexander Hamilton in May 1702. Hamilton noted that the foreignness and ostensibly poor governance of Badr ul-Alam evoked the hostility of some orang kayas (grandees of the kingdom). Thus he imposed a harbour fee on the English ships and therefore estranged the English East India Company and at length people at the capital. There were demonstrations outside the palace where people demanded restitution of the former English privileges - otherwise they would place a new queen regnant or sultana on the throne. Some orang kayas contacted a nephew of Kamalat Syah who led a private life in Pidie and invited him to march on the capital to claim the throne. From Hamilton's account it is not known how the enterprise ended.

According to the chronicles, Badr ul-Alam suffered from a sickness (apparently poliomyelitis) which prevented him from performing the salat (prayers). He therefore voluntarily abdicated his throne in 1702. He then withdrew to Tanjong, a village close to the capital but died after 14 days. Some sources date his abdication in 1709. His successor was a brother, Perkasa Alam Syarif Lamtui. It is possible that the details in the chronicles about his demise are incorrect, for in 1717 the Dutch provided a travel pass to an ex-sultan of Aceh named Sayyid Hasyim Darussalam who was performing the pilgrimage to Mecca.

== Literature ==
- Coolhaas, W.P., ed. (1976) Generale missiven van Gouverneurs-Generaal en Raden aan Heren XVII der Verenigde Oostindische Compagnie, Deel VI: 1698-1713. 's-Gravenhage: M. Nijhoff.
- Coolhaas, W.P., ed. (1979) Generale missiven van Gouverneurs-Generaal en Raden aan Heren XVII der Verenigde Oostindische Compagnie, Deel VII: 1713-1725. 's-Gravenhage: M. Nijhoff.
- Crecelius, D. and Beardow, E.A. (1979) 'A Reputed Acehese Sarakata of the Jamal al-La'il Dynasty', Journal of the Malaysian Branch of the Royal Asiatic Society 52, pp. 51-66.
- Djajadiningrat, Raden Hoesein (1911) 'Critische overzicht van de in Maleische werken vervatte gegevens over de geschiedenis van het soeltanaat van Atjeh', Bijdragen tot de Taal-, Land- en Volkenkunde 65, pp. 135-265.
- Zainuddin, H.M. (1961) Tarich Atjeh dan Nusantara, Jilid I. Medan: Pustaka Iskandar Muda.

Preceded by Zainatuddin Kamalat Syah	Sultan of Aceh Sultanate; 1699 – 1702	Succeeded by Perkasa Alam Syarif Lamtui
