= Sheikh Yusuf =

Indonesian Muslim exiled to the Cape of Good Hope (1626–1699)

Muhammad Yusuf al-Maqassari

Personal life
- Born: Abadin Tadia Tjoessoep; 3 July 1626 Makassar, Sultanate of Gowa
- Died: 23 May 1699 (aged 72) Macassar, Dutch Cape Colony
- Buried: Kramat Of Sheikh Yusuf Al-Makassari, Cape Town, South Africa. Later moved to Kobbanga in Lakiung, Katangka, Gowa Regency, Indonesia in 1705.
- Era: Early modern period
- Main interest(s): Sufism, Fiqh, Tawhid, and Anti-colonialism

Religious life
- Religion: Islam
- Denomination: Sunni
- Jurisprudence: Shafi'i
- Tariqa: Shattariyya Sufi orders
- Creed: Athari

Muslim leader
- Disciple of: Ibrahim al-Kurani

Abadin Tadia Tjoessoep (3 July 1626 – 23 May 1699), more commonly known as Sheikh Yusuf or Sheik Joseph, was an Indonesian Muslim of noble Makassar descent. He was also known as Muhammad Yusuf al-Maqassari or Tuanta Salamaka ri Gowa (Savior from Gowa). In 1693 he was exiled to the Cape of Good Hope, South Africa, which resulted in his establishing Islam in the Cape.

== Early and middle life (Nusantara) ==
Yusuf was born as nephew of the Sultan Alauddin of Gowa, in today Makassar, Indonesia. In 1644 he embarked on the Hajj to Mecca and spent several years in Arabia learning under various pious scholars, there he studied under Shattariyya sufi masters such as Ahmad al-Qushashi and the Kurdish Sunni Muslim scholar Ibrahim al-Kurani. During this period the Dutch and British East India Companies were fighting for control of the region due to its lucrative trade in spices and gold. When Yusuf left Arabia in 1664, Makassar had been captured by the Dutch, and he was unable to return home. Instead, he headed for Bantam on the island of Java, where he was welcomed by Sultan Ageng Tirtayasa. Ageng gave Yusuf the hand of one of his daughters in marriage, and made him his chief religious judge and personal advisor. Yusuf stayed in Bantam for 16 years until 1680, when Ageng's son, Pangeran Hajji, rose against his father, possibly at the urgings of the Dutch East India Company. Ageng rallied his forces, including Yusuf, and in 1683 besieged Hajji in his fortress at Soerdesoeang. Ageng was defeated but managed to escape capture, along with an entourage of about 5,000, among them the 57-year-old Yusuf. Ageng was captured later that year but Yusuf managed to escape a second time and continued the resistance.

== Exile to the Cape and establishment of Islam ==
In 1684 Yusuf was persuaded to surrender on the promise of a pardon, but the Dutch reneged on their promise and instead imprisoned him at the castle of Batavia. Suspecting that he would attempt escape, the Dutch transferred him to Ceylon in September that year, before exiling him to the Cape on 27 June 1694 on the ship Voetboeg. Yusuf, along with 49 followers including two wives, two concubines and twelve children, was received in the Cape on 2 April 1694 by governor Simon van der Stel. They were housed on the farm Zandvliet, far outside of Cape Town, in an attempt to minimise his influence on the DEIC's slaves. The plan failed however; Yusuf's settlement soon became a sanctuary for slaves and it was here that the first cohesive Islamic community in South Africa was established. From here the message of Islam was disseminated to the slave community of Cape Town.

Sheikh Yusuf died at Zandvliet on 23 May 1699. Thereafter the area surrounding Zandvliet farm was renamed Macassar after his place of birth. He was buried on the hills of Faure, overlooking Macassar.

== Legacy and honours ==
To honour Sheikh Yusuf, a shrine was erected over his grave in Cape Town and to this day Muslims in the area visit it to pay their respects. In 1705, on the request of Sultan Abdul Jalil of Gowa, his body was moved to kobbanga (burial) in Lakiung, Katangka, Gowa, South Sulawesi. Similarly, his grave in Lakiung is busy with pilgrims to pay their respects.

Sheikh Yusuf was declared a National Hero of Indonesia on 7 August 1995. He was also posthumously awarded the Order of the Companions of O. R. Tambo in Gold on 27 September 2005, for his contribution to the struggle against colonialism.

Order of Mendi for Bravery (2005)

== See also ==
- List of Sufis
- Islam in Indonesia
- Islam in South Africa
- Dargah

== Sources ==
- Azra, Azyumardi (2004). The Origins of Islamic Reformism in Southeast Asia. University of Hawaii Press. ISBN 0-8248-2848-8.
