= Ahmad al-Qushashi =

Safi al-Din Ahmad ibn Muhammad al-Dajani al-Qushashi (Arabic: صفي الدين أحمد بن محمد الدَّجاني القُشاشي ,1583-1661) was a prominent Sufi master (murshid) of the Shattariyya order, who was born in Medina in 991 Hijri, or 1583 CE. His family descended from Tamim al-Dari, one of the companions of the Islamic prophet Muhammad.

In 1602, his father took him to study from Yemeni scholars. After returning to Medina, he studied the Shattariyya order from Ahmad al-Shinnawi, who later also became his father-in-law. After Al-Shinnawi died, Al-Qushashi became his successor in teaching the Shattariyya order in Madina.

Al-Qushashi taught the order in a more Sharia-oriented nature and rejected the wahdat al-wujud teaching. This was a change from the previously more syncretic nature of the order. Thus, the dissemination of the Shattariya order by Al-Qushashi students also brought a more orthodox Sufism as their teacher.

Some of Al-Qushashi's well-known students from Southeast Asia including Abd al-Rauf al-Sinkili (Aceh), Abd al-Muhyi of Pamijahan (West Java), Yusuf al-Makassari (South Sulawesi), and Abd al-Malik ibn Abdullah (Trengganu).

After he died, the student who became his successor was Ibrahim al-Kurani, who maintained close relationships with the order's students from Southeast Asia.

== See also ==
- Abu'l-Mawahib al-Shinnawi
- Shattari
