= Crown Matrimonial =

Right under Scots law for a male consort to reign

In Scots law, the Crown Matrimonial was the right of a queen regnant's male consort to reign equally with his wife, as co-sovereign.

== Francis II of France ==
The Crown Matrimonial of Scotland was sought by King Francis II of France, husband of Mary, Queen of Scots, by the Parliament of Scotland and Mary's mother, queen Mary of Guise, who was regent of Scotland. It would make Francis legal co-sovereign of Scotland with Queen Mary, and would also grant Francis the right to keep the Scottish throne if he outlived her. By the terms of the offer, he would be able to pass the Scottish crown to his descendants by a wife other than Mary. The Crown of Scotland was to be sent to France, where it was supposed to be kept at the Abbey of Saint Denis. However, the offer was never realised, as the Hamilton family, who were close to the throne, joined the Protestants and opposed it.

== Henry Stuart, Lord Darnley ==
Mary's second husband, Henry Stuart, Lord Darnley, also demanded the Crown Matrimonial after their wedding on 29 July 1565. The Protestant peers promised to make him sovereign by the consent of Parliament. They agreed that Henry, as the new sovereign, would pardon all the exiled Protestants and allow them to return to Scotland. However, the plan was never realised.

Darnley was disappointed by his lack of royal status and regarded this as a slight on his family honour. Among several incidents which may have been humiliating, in February 1566 Nicolas d'Angennes, sieur de Rambouillet, came to Edinburgh with the heraldic Order of Saint Michael for him. Rambouillet was told by the Privy Council that Darnley's personal coat of arms should be used, without any indication of his consort role.

== See also ==
- Jure uxoris
- King consort
- Clan Hamilton
