= Taj ul-Alam =

Sultana of Aceh

Taj ul-Alam Safiatuddin Syah
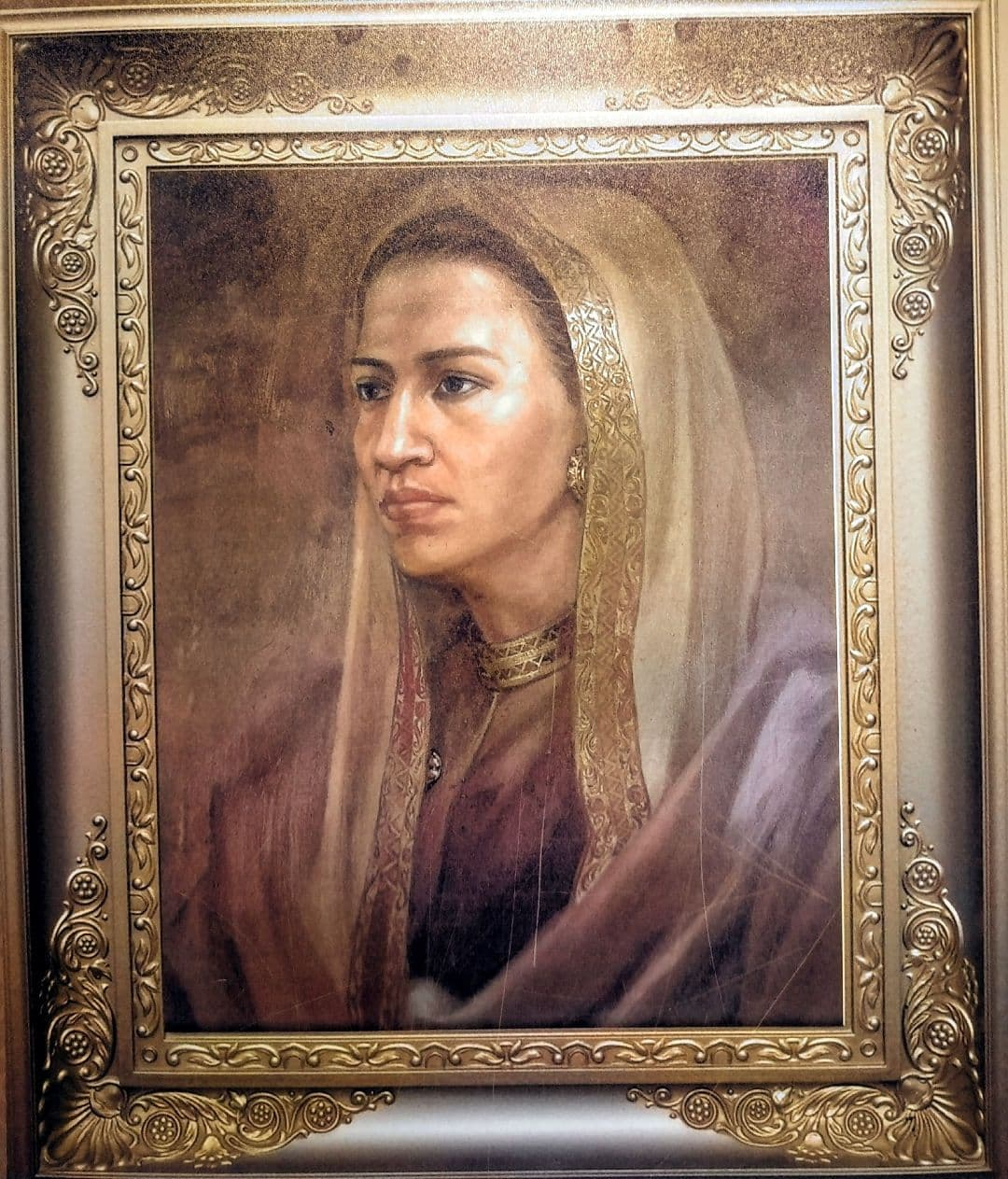

Sultana of Aceh Sultanate
- Reign: 18 February 1641 – 23 October 1675
- Predecessor: Iskandar Thani
- Successor: Nurul Alam Naqiatuddin Syah

Queen consort of Aceh Sultanate
- Tenure: 27 December 1636 – 15 February 1641
- Predecessor: Putroe Tsani Ratna Indra binti Teungku Chik di Reubee Lela Daeng Mansur.
- Born: Putri Sri Alam; 1612; Banda Aceh, Aceh Sultanate
- Died: 23 October 1675 (aged 62–63); Banda Aceh, Aceh Sultanate
- Spouse: Iskandar Thani
Regnal name
- Sri Sulṭānah Ratu Safiatuddin Tajul-‘Alam Syah Johan Berdaulat Zillu’llahi fi’l-‘Alam
- House: Meukuta Alam
- Father: Iskandar Muda
- Religion: Islam

Sulṭāna Taj ul-Alam Safiatuddin Syah (1612 – 23 October 1675; born Putri Sri Alam) was the fourteenth ruler of Aceh. She was the daughter of the sultan Iskandar Muda and the wife of his successor, Iskandar Thani. She became sulṭāna upon the death of her husband and ruled from 1641 to 1675, being the first of four women to hold the position in succession.

== Marriage and accession ==
The future sultana was originally named Putri Sri Alam Permisuri. In 1617, her father Iskandar Muda conquered Pahang on the Malay Peninsula. A son of the defeated sultan, the future Iskandar Thani was brought as a prisoner to Aceh where he was raised as the foster son of Iskandar Muda. In 1619, when he was 9 years old, he was married to Putri Sri Alam Permisuri. The couple was provided with a palace next to that of the sultan, called Sri Wareuna. After the death of Iskandar Muda, Iskandar Thani succeeded to the throne but died after a short reign on 15 February 1641. The news of his demise created grave disturbances among the grandees of the kingdom and some people lost their lives. However, after three days it was agreed that the sultan's widow would be enthroned.

== Female rule in Aceh ==
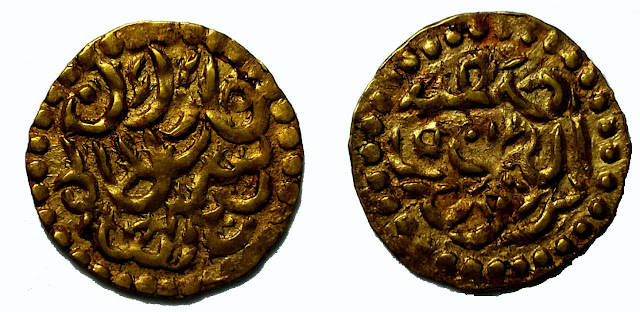
This is a gold coin from Sultanah Taj Alam Safiat Ad-Din Shah era. She is the first female to be throned in Aceh Sultanate. She was a widow of Sultan Iskandar Thani. She reigned Aceh from 1641 - 1675 CE.

Putri Sri Alam ascended the throne and took the title Sultana Taj ul-Alam Safiatuddin Syah. Taj ul-Alam Safiatuddin literally meaning "world crown, pure-of-faith". She became first of four queens regnant or sultanas who sat on the throne in succession from 1641 to 1699. Given the strongly Muslim profile of Aceh, this has evoked considerable debate among historians. The enthronement of Taj ul-Alam has been seen as an effort of the Acehnese nobility to weaken royal power following Iskandar Muda's administrative reforms aimed at undermining them. According to this view, these efforts were largely successful. From her reign onwards, the sultanate became a weak symbolic institution, whose authority was limited to the capital city itself. Meanwhile, real power was held by the hereditary rulers of outlying districts (the uleëbalang set up by Iskandar Muda) and the religious leaders (imam or ulama).

It has also been suggested that old Southeast Asian tradition, which acknowledged inheritance on the female line, was more important here than orthodox Muslim principles. This would have been the reason for the enthronement of Taj ul-Alam, rather than a conscious strategy by the grandees to weaken the power of the court. Closer analysis of the age of queens has furthermore pointed out that the period should not necessarily be seen as one of societal decline, that it was ruled by softer and more flexible hands than before 1641, and that Aceh after all was able to withstand Western pressure to the extent that it preserved its independence. In the rest of the East Indies, once-powerful indigenous states such as Mataram, Ternate, Banten and Makassar lost their autonomy or became heavily dependent on the Dutch East India Company (VOC) in the late 17th century.

== Dutch advances on Sumatra ==
The reign of Taj ul-Alam saw a contraction of the sultanate's power outside the Acehnese heartland. On the Malay Peninsula, Johor's subordinated position vis-à-vis Aceh was abrogated. Pahang was also given up; however, Aceh retained the tin-producing Perak. The Dutch East India Company (VOC) coveted the tin. After some preliminary problems, a number of Dutch staying in Perak were murdered in 1651. The VOC ships blockaded Aceh for periods before a treaty was made in 1659. Half of the tin of Perak would go to the VOC which also obtained the monopoly of trade on Acehnese ports. Furthermore, a trading post was permitted in Padang on Sumatra's west coast. The monopoly clause was not fulfilled, however. Meanwhile, the towns on the west coast began to seek association with the VOC. After secret negotiations the Painan treaty was signed in 1663 between the Dutch and a number of dissatisfied chiefs. In the next year 1664, Jacob Couw appeared with an armada of 300 men and expelled the Acehnese from the coastal area, from Indrapura in the south to Tiku in the north. Meanwhile, Aceh had to endure more Dutch blockades and was forced to sign new treaties. The west coast Malays nevertheless often preferred the rule of Aceh before the VOC "protection", so that Acehnese influence endured for a long time. On the east coast, Deli fell away from Acehnese rule in 1669.

== Achievements ==
In spite of these political setbacks, Taj ul-Alam was praised by both indigenous and European writers. The chronicle Bustanus Salatin characterized her as virtuous and pious, implying that her qualities made Aceh peaceful and prosperous. Likewise a Dutch witness asserted that she led a "good-natured but awe-inspiring" rule. She inherited a tradition of Islamic scholarship in the court. She was not as favorable to Nuruddin ar-Raniri as her predecessor, and he left the royal employ in 1644. The major writer in her reign was Abdurrauf of Singkil, who wrote on Shafi'i jurisprudence as well as mysticism. A proliferation of Islamic literature and learning took place under the reign of Taj ul-Alam and the three queens who succeeded her. This cultural renaissance was, among other things, conditioned by an effective collaboration between the queens and the ulamas. Acehnese Muslims are known to have appeared in Siam in 1668 with the intention to spread the faith.

Taj ul-Alam died on 23 October 1675. She did not leave any children. With her death, the House of Meukuta Alam died out and was replaced by the other dynasty. Her successor was yet a queen, Sultan Nurul Alam Naqiatuddin Syah, whose relationship with Taj ul-Alam is uncertain.

== Literature ==
- Andaya, Leonard Y. (2004). "'A very good-natured but awe-inspiring government': The reign of a successful queen in seventeenth-century Aceh". In Locher-Scholten, Elsbeth; Rietbergen, Peter (eds.). Hof en handel. Leiden: KITLV Press. pp. 59–84. doi:10.1163/9789004454460_005. ISBN 978-90-04-45446-0.
- Djajadiningrat, Raden Hoesein (1911). "Critisch overzicht van de in Maleische werken vervatte gegevens over de geschiedenis van het soeltanaat van Atjeh". Bijdragen tot de Taal-, Land- en Volkenkunde (in Dutch). 65 (1/2): 135–265. JSTOR 20769622.
- Stibbe, D.G.; Spat, C., eds. (1917). Encyclopaedie van Nederlandsch-Indië (in Dutch). Vol. 1. 's-Gravenhage & Leiden: Martinus Nijhoff & Brill Publishers. hdl:1887.1/item:181627.
- Khan, Sher Banu (2010). "The Sultanahs of Aceh, 1641–99". In Graf, Arndt; Schroter, Susanne; Wieringa, Edwin (eds.). Aceh: History, Politics and Culture. Singapore: ISEAS Publishing. pp. 3–25. doi:10.1355/9789814279130-004.
- Lombard, Denys (1967). Le Sultanat d'Atjéh au temps d'Iskandar Muda, 1607-1636 (in French). Paris: École francais d'Extrême-Orient.
- Ricklefs, Merle C. (1994). A History of Modern Indonesia Since c. 1300 (2nd ed.). Stanford: Stanford University Press. pp. 35–36, 51.

Preceded by Iskandar Thani	Sultana; 1641 – 23 October 1675	Succeeded by Nurul Alam Naqiatuddin Syah
