= Dhaain of the Maldives =

Sultana regnant of the Maldives from 1383 to 1388

Al- Sultana Dhaain Kamba
- Lady of twelve thousand isles, the Sultana of the Maldives
- Reign: 1384–1388 or 1383–1388 or 1385–1388
- Coronation: 1383
- Predecessor: Sultan Mohamed I
- Successor: Abdullah II
- Born: Sultanate of the Maldives
- Died: Sultanate of the Maldives
- Spouse: Sultan Abdullah II
Names
- Al- Sultana Dhaain Kambaidhi Kilege Sri Nithaa Abaarana Mahaa Rehendhi
- Dynasty: Theemuge Dynasty
- Father: Sultan Mohamed I
- Mother: Sultana Raadhafathi

Al- Sultana Dhaain Kambaidhi Kilege Sri Nithaa Abaarana Mahaa Rehendhi, was the Sultana regnant of the Maldives from 1383 to 1388. She was also known as Fatima.

She was the daughter of Sultana Raadhafathi and Sultan Fageethu Mohamedul Maakurathee of the Maldives (Mohamed I) and succeeded to the throne. Some sources claim that she was forced to abdicate in favor of her husband, who then became Sultan Abdullah II of the Maldives. Other sources say that she ruled in her own right, reigning until her death in 1388.

Preceded by Mohamed I	Sultan of the Maldives; 1383–1388	Succeeded by Abdullah II
