= Abu'l-Mawahib al-Shinnawi =

Abu'l-Mawahib al-Shinnawi or Abu'l-Mawahib Ahmad ibn Ali ibn Abd al-Quddus al-Shinnawi (Arabic: أحمد بن علي بن احمد بن عبد القدوس ابن محمد الشناوي أبو المواهب ) also known as "al-Khami" or al-Hanna'i (Arabic: الحنائي ) is a master of Shattariyya Sufi order.

== His life ==
He was born in a well-known Sufi family al-Shinnawi in 975 H.E./1568 A.D. in Mahallat Ruh, west of Cairo. His father Ali ibn Abd al-Quddus al-Shinnawi was a popular leader and Ahmadi shaykh (after Ahmad al-Badawi (d. 675 H.E./1276 A.D.)). He moved to Medina and settled there for religious studies. Later he became a prominent Sufi and the leading shaykh for Naqshabandiyya in Medina in his time. The order was ordered to Medina with Shattariyya by the Indian shaykh Sibghatallah ibn Ruhallah al-Sindi al-Barwaji.

He died in 1028 H.E/1619 A.D. His many students included Safi al-Din al-Qushashi who venerated his teacher as the saintly "Seal of the Time".

== His works ==
Al-Baghdadi and Brockelmann listed 18 respectively 5 of al-Shinnawi's work.

1. al-Irshad 'ila Sabil al-Rashad
2. Ifadat al-Jud fi wahdat al-Wujud
3. al-Iqlid al-Farid fi Tajrid al-Tawhid
4. Bay'at al-Itlaq
5. al-Ta'sil wa al-Tafdil
6. Tajalliyah al-Basa'ir Hashiyat 'ala Kitab al-Jawahir li al-Gawth al-Hindi
7. Khulasat al-Ikhtisas wa ma li'l-kul min al-Khawas
8. Diwan Shi'r al-Shinnawi
9. al-Sultat al-Ahmadiyyah fi Rawa'ih Mada'ih al-Dhat al-Muhammadiyah
10. Si'at al-Itlaq
11. Shifa' al-Ghiram fi Akhbar al-Kiram
12. Sadihat al-Azal wa Sanihat al-Nazal
13. al-Suhuf al-Namusiyyah wa al-sikhuf al-Nawusiyyah
14. Dama'ir al-Sara'ir al-Ilahiyyah fi Bawahir 'Ayat Jawahir al-Ghawthiyah
15. Fat'h al-Ilah fi ma Yuqal dubur kull al-Salat
16. Fawatih al-Salawat al-Ahmadiyyah fi Lawa'ih Mada'ih al-Dhat al-Ahmadiyyah
17. Manahij al-Ta'sil
18. Mawjat al-Rahmah wa Mawthiqat al-'Ismah
