= Mohamed I of the Maldives =

Sultan of the Maldives (r. 1380–85)

- Lord of twelve thousand isles, the Sultan of the Maldives
- Reign: 1380–1384 or 1380–1385
- Coronation: 1380
- Predecessor: Raadhafathi
- Successor: Dhaain
- Born: Sultanate of the Maldives
- Died: 1385; Sultanate of the Maldives
- Burial: 1385
- Spouse: Raadhafathi
- Issue: Dhaain
Names
- Al-Sultan Mohammed I Sri Sundhura Abaarana Mahaaradhun
- Dynasty: Theemuge Dynasty
- Father: Kaeumani Kaulhanna Kilege

Al-Sultan Mohammed I Sri Sundhura Abaarana Mahaaradhun (Dhivehi: އައްސުލްޠާން މުޙައްމަދު އެއްވަނަ ސިރީ ސުންދުރަ އަބާރަނަ މަހާރަދުން) was the prince consort turned sultan of the Maldives from 1380 to 1385. He was the son of Kaeumani Kaulhanna Kilege (Dhivehi: ކައެއުމަނި ކައުޅައްނާކިލޭގެ) and the husband of his predecessor Raadhafathi. He ruled the country for five years until his death in 1385. He was succeeded by his daughter, Dhaain. He is also known as Maakurathu Mohamed Rasgefaan or Mohamed of Maakurathu, as he is from the island of Maakurathu in Raa Atoll (Maalhosmadulhu Atoll), Maldives.

According to a few theories, Sultan Mohamed forced his wife Sultana Raadhafathi to abdicate. Another theory suggests that he became a sultan regent until his daughter Sultana Dhaain become eligible to rule.

Preceded by Raadhafathi	Sultan of the Maldives; 1380–1385	Succeeded by Dhaain
