= Zainatuddin of Aceh =

Zainatuddin Kamalat Syah
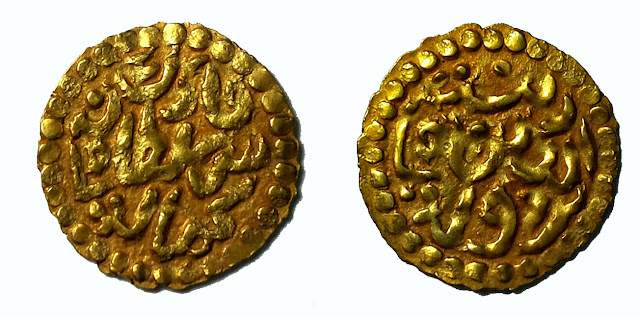
- This is a gold coin from Sultanah Kamalat Shah era. She is the fourth female to be throned in Aceh She reigned Aceh from 1688 - 1699 CE.

Sultana of Aceh Darussalam
- Reign: 3 October 1688 – October 1699
- Predecessor: Inayat Zakiatuddin Syah
- Successor: Badr ul-Alam Syarif Hasyim Jamaluddin

Queen consort of Aceh Sultanate
- Tenure: October 1699 – 1700
- Born: Banda Aceh, Aceh Sultanate
- Died: 1700; Banda Aceh, Aceh Sultanate
- Spouse: Captain of the Guard, name unknown
Names
- Paduka Seri Baginda Sultan Zainatuddin Kamalat Syah
- Father: possibly Syekh Muhammad Fadlil Syah
- Religion: Sunni Islam

Paduka Seri Baginda Sultan Zainatuddin Kamalat Syah (died 1700) was the seventeenth ruler of Aceh Darussalam. She reigned from 1688 to 1699, being the fourth and last ruling queen (sultanah) in succession.

== Background ==
When the old sultana Inayat Zakiatuddin Syah died in October 1688, Sultana Zainatuddin Kamalat Syah succeeded to the throne. There is no contemporary evidence about her relationship to the previous queens. According to a manuscript preserved at Universiti Kebangsaan Malaysia, she was the daughter of Syekh Muhammad Fadlil Syah Teungku di Kedirian, son of Abdullah Fadlil, son of Muhyuddin Fadlil, son of Sultan Sri Alam. This would need further verification. Not all the orang kayas (grandees of the kingdom) supported the choice. Some wanted a male rather than a female ruler. Four orang kayas marched against the capital with considerable forces; however, the opposition soon receded and the queen was acknowledged.

== Reign ==
After almost six decades of female rule in Aceh Darussalam there was increasing pressure for a male sultan. A Dutch visitor, Jacob de Roy, reported in 1696 that the sultana formally held unlimited powers and convened the assembly of grandees; however, she had to await the approval of the majority of the counselors. He also wrote that groups of people sometimes gathered in the capital Kutaraja and performed demonstrations in favour of a king. The syahbandar (harbour master) entertained plans to arrange a marriage between the queen and his son, a captain of the guard who stood in high regard with Zainatuddin Kamalat Syah. He asked Jacob de Roy to mediate in the affair since he realized that a marriage would evoke the envy of the orang kayas. Another Dutch writer, Francois Valentijn indicates that the marriage was eventually concluded. In 1699 a purported fatwa arrived from Mecca, issued by the qadi Malik al-Adil. Whether it was genuine or if the authority of Mecca was employed to make an impression is debatable. The fatwa deemed that the rule of a woman was contrary to the principles of Islam. Upon this the sultana was replaced by an Arab of sayyid descent, Badr ul-Alam Syarif Hasyim Jamaluddin. It is sometimes speculated that he became her husband. Zainatuddin died one year later, in 1700.

== Literature ==
- Djajadiningrat, Raden Hoesein (1911). "Critisch overzicht van de in Maleische werken vervatte gegevens over de geschiedenis van het soeltanaat van Atjeh". Bijdragen tot de Taal-, Land- en Volkenkunde (in Dutch). 65 (1/2): 135–265. JSTOR 20769622.
- Hasjmy, A. (1977). 59 tahun Aceh merdeka dibawah pemerintahan ratu (PDF) (in Indonesian). Jakarta: Bulan Bintan.
- Khan, Sher Banu (2009). Rule Behind the Silk Curtain: The Sultanahs of Aceh, 1641-1699 (PhD thesis). University of London.
- Khan, Sher Banu (2010). "The Sultanahs of Aceh, 1641–99". In Graf, Arndt; Schroter, Susanne; Wieringa, Edwin (eds.). Aceh: History, Politics and Culture. Singapore: ISEAS Publishing. pp. 3–25. doi:10.1355/9789814279130-004.
- Ricklefs, Merle C. (1994). A History of Modern Indonesia Since c. 1300 (2nd ed.). Stanford: Stanford University Press.

| Preceded by Inayat Zakiatuddin Syah | Sultana of Aceh Darussalam; 3 October 1688 – October 1699 | Succeeded by Badr ul-Alam Syarif Hasyim Jamaluddin |
