= Shattariyya =

Sufi mystic order in Sunni Islam

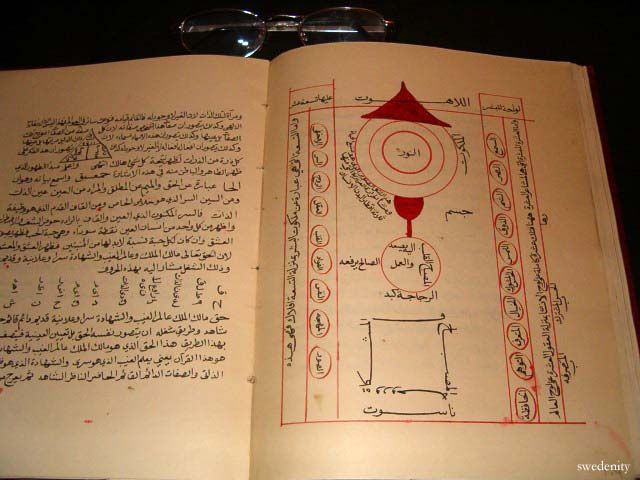
The book Jawahir-i khams, (The Five Jewels).

The Shattari or Shattariyya are members of a Sufi order founded in the 15th century by Abdullah Shattar in Khorasan before immigrating to India. Later, secondary branches were taken to the Hejaz and to Indonesia. The word Shattar means "lightning-quick," "speed," "rapidity," or "fast-goer" shows a system of spiritual practices that lead to a state of "completion."

Unlike other Sufis, the Shattariyya do not subscribe to the concept of fana (annihilation of the ego). "With the sect of Shattaris, the Salik (seeker, aspirant) descends, of himself, in his knowledge - there is no annihilation of self with them." (Note: In that book, however, Khan is not recommending this course of action, seeing it as a "thorny path" (p15) and commenting that "Imagination and judgment are upset, and a man is liable to become an Egotist (Self expressionist). This path is therefore abjured." (pp15–16).)

== History ==
Idries Shah, writing in The Sufis, states that the Shattari technique or "the Rapidness" originated with the Naqshbandi Sufi Order.

The spiritual lineage of this order is a chain of transmission (silsila) said to pass from Muhammad through Bayazid Bastami (753-845 CE). The Shattari order is thus a branch of the Tayfuri Khanwada. It was reputedly founded by Sheikh Sirajuddin Abdullah Shattar (d. 1406 CE), great grandson (fifth generation) of Sheikh Shihabuddin Suhrawardi. (Founder of Suharwardiya Khaanwad). He was seventh lineage disciple to Bayazid Bustami and was honored with Khilafat (Spiritual Deputyhood) from all of the 14 Sufi Tayfuriya orders (Khanwaads or Gharaanaas). Shattar was deputized and given the honorific "Shattar" by his teacher Sheikh Muhammad Taifur in recognition of the austerities he faced in achieving this station (maqām).

Originating in Persia, the order and its teachings were later brought to India by Sheikh Abdullah Shattar. According to Idries Shah, Shattar made India his home in the fifteenth century. His procedure was to approach the chief of a Sufi group and say, 'Teach me your method, share it with me. If you will not, I invite you to share mine.'"

One of the order's distinguished masters was the 16th century Sufi, Shah Muhammad Ghawth (d. 1562/3 C.E.) (14th Ramadan 970 hijri). Ghawth developed the Shattariyya more fully into a "distinctive order"; and also taught the Mughal Emperor Humayun, He wrote the book Jawahir-i khams, (The Five Jewels). The influence of the Shattari Order grew strong during Ghawth's leadership and spread through South Asia.

Ghawth later became the tutor of the Mughal emperor Akbar's favorite and legendary musician, Tansen as well. Although Tansen was a Hindu by birth, Shah Ghawth adopted him as an orphan and tutored him in both Sufism and music, appointing him as one of the Khalifa (spiritual deputy) of Mohammad Ghouse. Tansen was buried in Ghawth's tomb complex.

A later successor was Wajihuddin Alvi (d. 1018 AH / 1609 CE), also known by the title 'Haider Ali Saani'. He was born in Champaner, an ancient city of Eastern Gujarat. He later moved to Ahmedabad where he received and imparted knowledge in Islamic studies. He became a prominent scholar of his times and a Mufti. Royals of that time came to him for an opinion on complex religious issues. He lived a simple life and always kept a humble profile. He used to share whatever came to him with the poor and the needy. He was buried at Wajihuddin's Tomb, built by one of his followers, Syed Murtuza Khan Bukhari, in Khanpur, Ahmedabad. A saint, he wrote many books and founded an educational institution (madrasa).

In the late sixteenth/early seventeenth century C.E. a secondary branch of Shattariyya was formed in Medina by Sibghatallah ibn Ryuhallah al-Hindi al-Barwaji (d.1606 C.E.), a Naqshbandi shaykh. His disciple Abu'l-Mawahib al-Shinnawi (d. 1619) continued the order there. The Shattaris went on to play an important role in Medina through the seventeenth century C.E. under Ahmad al-Qushashi, al-Shinnawi's successor, and then Ibrahim al-Kurani (d. 1689 C.E.) who was also initiated into other orders including the Naqshbandiyya, Qadiriyya and Chishtiyya. Al-Kurani's disciple Abd al Ra'uf Singkel was authorised by him to introduce the Shattariyya to Indonesia. The Shattariyya became popular in Aceh and Java, particularly in Pamijahan and Cirebon (where it became closely associated with the court).

Ibrahim al-Kurani's son, Muhammad Abu'l Tahir al-Kurani (d.1733 C.E.) inherited his father's position as head of the Medina Shattariyya as well as the role of teacher in the Prophet's mosque and Shafi'i mufti in the city. Among his students was the great Indian Naqshbandi reformer Shah Waliullah Dihlawi (d.1763 C.E.). Abu'l Tahir initiated Shah Waliullah into the Naqshbandiyya in Medina. He also initiated him into the Shadhiliyya, Shattariyya, Suhrawardiyya and Kubrawiyya.

== Method ==
The Shattariyya subscribed to six fundamental principles:

(i) One should not believe in self-negation but adhere to self-affirmation.

(ii) Contemplation is a waste of time.

(iii) Self-effacement is a wrong idea: one must say nothing except "I am I." Unity is to understand One, see One, say One and to hear One. A Sufi of this order must say "I am one" and "There is no partner with me."

(iv) There is no need to oppose to the ego (nafs) or of mujaheda (struggle, participation in jihad with oneself).

(v) There is no such state as annihilation (fana) since this would require two personalities, one wishing for annihilation and the other in whom annihilation takes place, which is dualism and not unity.

(vi) One should not abstain from eating certain foods but instead should consider one's ego, its attributes and actions as identical with those of the Universal Ego. The animal soul is not an obstacle for reaching God.

The Shattariyya held to the principle of wahdat al-wujud (Unity of Existence) expounded by Ibn Arabi. Abu'l-Mawahib al-Shinnawi was an outspoken adherent of this doctrine. And Shinnawi's successor, Ahmad al-Qushashi was described by the contemporary Damascene scholar Muhammad Amin al Muhibbi as "The Imam of those who expound the unity of existence".

Some aspects of Shattari teaching sought to utilize parts of Nath Yoga and other forms of yogic mystical practice to give rise to a highly sophisticated, distinct and intense Indian 'mystical' Sufi method, as compared to the more usual and less intense 'jurist' Sufi methods or orders of Iraq, Arabia, Turkey and northern Africa. Sheikh Baha' al-Din Shattari (d. 1515 C.E.) incorporated Indian spiritual practices into his Risala-i Shattariyya (The Shattari Treatise). Later The Pool of Nectar (traced by Carl Ernst to the Hindu Amrtakunda), was translated into Persian by Muhammad Ghawth. This translation was a systematic account of yogic mantras and visualization practices, assimilated and incorporated into the conceptual structure of Sufi tradition, and included an account of the chakras together with the practices required to activate them, with Sufi wazifas substituted for the traditional yogic mantras.

== See also ==
- Muhammad Ghawth
- Wajihuddin Alvi
- Shah Manjhan
- Hashim Peer Dastagir
- Abu'l-Mawahib al-Shinnawi
- Sibghatallah ibn Ruhallah al-Sindi al-Barwaji
- Ali ibn Abd al-Quddus al-Shinnawi
- Maulana Shahbaz Muhammad

== Bibliography ==
- Trimingham, John Spencer and Voll, John O. (1998). The Sufi orders in Islam. Oxford University Press USA. pp. 97–98. ISBN 0-19-512058-2.
