= Raadhafathi of the Maldives =

Sultana regnant of the Maldives (r. 1379–83)

- Lady of Twelve Thousand Isles; Sultana of the Maldives
- Reign: 1379–1380 or 1379–1383
- Predecessor: Rehendhi Kadhyja
- Successor: Mohamed I of the Maldives
- Died: 1383
- Burial: 1383
- Spouse: Mohamed I of the Maldives
Names
- Mariyam Raadhafathi al-Rehendhi
- Dynasty: Theemuge dynasty
- Father: Sultan Jalaaduddin Umar Vir of the Maldives

Al-Sultana Raadhafathi Sri Suvama Abaarana Mahaa Rehendhi (Dhivehi: އައްސުލްޠާނާ ރާދަފަތި ސިރީ ސުވަމަ އަބާރަނަ މަހާރެހެންދި) was the Sultana regnant of the Maldives in 1379–1383. she was also known as Myriam.

She was the third daughter of Sultan Jalaaduddin Umar Vir of the Maldives and ascended the throne of the Maldives after the death of her sister, the long-reigning Sultana Rehendhi Khadijah. Her husband, Mohamed of Maakurath, served as her vizier. In 1383, she died, and was succeeded by her husband. According to some theory Sultana Raadhafathi's husband forced her to abdicate.

Preceded by Khadijah	Sultan of the Maldives; 1379–83	Succeeded by Mohamed I
