= Poet laureate =

Officially appointed poet

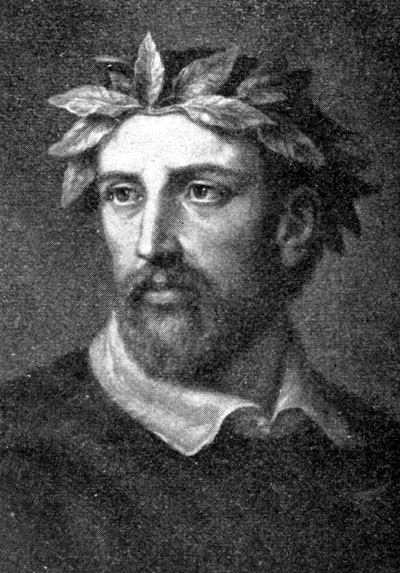
A depiction of Torquato Tasso from a German encyclopedia, 1905. Note the laurel crown.

A poet laureate (plural: poets laureate) is a poet officially appointed by a government or conferring institution, typically expected to compose poems for special events and occasions. Albertino Mussato of Padua and Francesco Petrarca (Petrarch) of Arezzo were the first to be crowned poets laureate after the classical age, respectively in 1315 and 1342. In Britain, the term dates from the appointment of Bernard André by Henry VII of England. The royal office of Poet Laureate in England dates from the appointment of John Dryden in 1668.

In modern times, the title of poet laureate may be conferred by an organization such as the Poetry Foundation, which designates a Young People's Poet Laureate, unconnected with the National Youth Poet Laureate and the United States Poet Laureate.

The office is also popular with regional and community groups. Examples include the Pikes Peak Poet Laureate, which is designated by a "Presenting Partners" group from within the community, the Minnesota poet laureate chosen by the League of Minnesota Poets (est. 1934), the Northampton Poet Laureate chosen by the Northampton Arts Council, and the Martha's Vineyard Poet Laureate chosen by ten judges representing the Martha's Vineyard Poetry Society.

== Background ==
In ancient Greece, the laurel was used to form a crown or wreath of honour for poets and heroes. The custom derives from the ancient myth of Apollo and Daphne (Daphne signifying "laurel" in Greek), and was revived in Padua for Albertino Mussato, followed by Petrarch's own crowning ceremony in the audience hall of the medieval senatorial palazzo on the Campidoglio on April 8, 1341. Because the Renaissance figures who were attempting to revive the Classical tradition lacked detailed knowledge of the Roman precedent they were attempting to emulate, these ceremonies took on the character of doctoral candidatures. In Persia, the poet laureate (amīr- or malek-al-šoʿarāʾ) carried artistic authority and were provided sources of income.

Since the office of poet laureate has become widely adopted, the term "laureate" has come to signify recognition for preeminence or superlative achievement (cf. Nobel laureate). A royal degree in rhetoric, poet laureate was awarded at European universities in the Middle Ages. The term therefore may refer to the holder of such a degree, which recognized skill in rhetoric, grammar, and language. During England's seventeenth century, the poet laureate served as the "court poet" of royalty, and was often called upon to celebrate state occasions until that role was abolished during the early 1800s. The skald in ancient Scandinavia often spent their careers too serving as the court poets of Norway's kings. Just like the first English poets laureate, ministers during China's feudal era presented "commanded poems" at royal events and were beholden to the ruling class. In Japan, the poet laureate (keikanshijin) was also imperially appointed and were often called upon to read at the annual Utakai Hajime. Comparatively, in Africa, kingdoms such as the Kuba in the Belgian Congo (modern day Democratic Republic of the Congo) appointed bards that served as both the royal historian and poet laureate. In addition to being known as poets laureate, bards were also referred to as "praise-poets" due to their special function of venerating the chief.

In the Xhosa language, Imbongi YeSizwethe can be translated to mean either "poet laureate" or "national poet". Similar to what is expressed in the Xhosa term, some poets have been dually noted as "poet laureate" and "national poet" depending upon the source: Agostinho Neto (Angola), Kazi Nazrul Islam (Bangladesh), Rabindranath Tagore (India), José Craveirinha (Mozambique), Mahmoud Darwish (Palestine), Mohamed Ibrahim Warsame 'Hadrawi' (Somalia), Edwin Thumboo (Singapore) and Taras Shevchenko (Ukraine). This contrasts with other figures such as Shamsur Rahman (Bangladesh), Thomas Moore (Bermuda), Leung Ping-kwan (Hong Kong), Francisco Borja da Costa (Timor–Leste) and Haji Gora Haji (Zanzibar)—who are conferred an "unofficial poet laureate" status due to their poetical works.

As of modern times, over a dozen national governments continue the poet laureate tradition. The Commonwealth of Nations even has its own position, and Selina Tusitala Marsh was appointed the inaugural Commonwealth Poet Laureate in 2025.

== By continent ==
=== Africa ===
==== Algeria ====
In Algeria, during the 11th century, Ibn Sharaf al-Qayrawani was the court poet of the Zīrids. Al-Thaghri Al-Tilimsani was appointed as a court poet during the Zayyanid dynasty.

==== Burkina Faso ====
Boûbacar Tinguidji, a Fula maabo, was appointed as the court poet of the Ruler of Dori.

==== Cameroon ====
Poets laureate of Cameroon include René Philombé.

==== Cape Verde ====
Poets laureate of Cape Verde include Eugénio Tavares.

==== Egypt ====
Ahmed Shawqi became Egypt's Poet Laureate in 1894.

==== Eritrea ====
Poets laureate of Eritrea include Reesom Haile.

==== Ethiopia ====
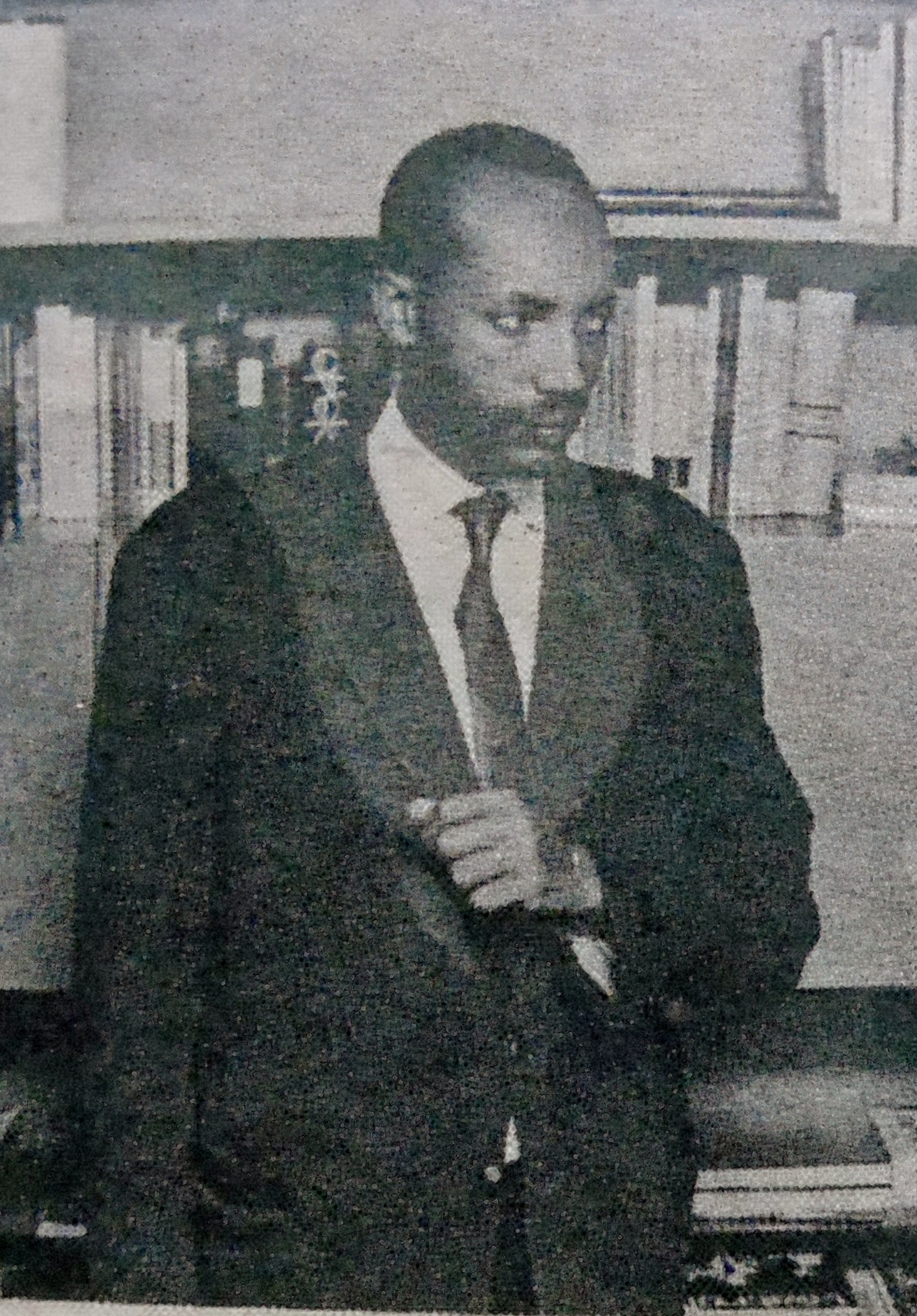
Tsegaye Gabre-Medhin of Ethiopia

In Ethiopia, the officially designated Laureate includes Tsegaye Gebre-Medhin. Tsegaye's award was granted in 1966 by His Majesty, Haile-Selasie II.

==== Gambia ====
Poets laureate of The Gambia include Lenrie Peters.

==== Ghana ====
Poets laureate of Ghana include Atukwei Okai.

==== Kenya ====
Muyaka bin Haji al-Ghassaniy was the Poet Laureate of Mombasa, Kenya.

==== Lesotho ====
Poets laureate of Lesotho include Joshua Pulumo Mohapeloa.

==== Liberia ====
Poets laureate for the Republic of Liberia have included Roland T. Dempster, Melvin B. Tolson (1947), and Patricia Jabbeh Wesley.

==== Libya ====
Libya-born Callimachus was appointed as an imperial court poet to Ptolemy II Philadelphus.

==== Madagascar ====
Poets laureate of Madagascar include Jacques Rabemananjara.

==== Malawi ====
Poets laureate of Malawi include Jack Mapanje.

==== Mali ====
Poets laureate of Mali include Ban Sumana Sisòkò.

==== Mauritania ====
Mohamed Ould Taleb was appointed as the official court poet during Mohamed Ould Abdel Aziz's presidency in Mauritania.

==== Mauritius ====
Poets laureate of Mauritius include Édouard Maunick.

==== Morocco ====
In the 13th century, Abdelaziz al-Malzuzi was the court poet of Abu Yahya ibn Abd al-Haqq. During the 16th-17th centuries in Morocco's history, Abd al-Aziz al-Fishtali was appointed as the poet laureate of the Sultan Ahmad al-Mansur.

==== Niger ====
Burkina Faso-born Boûbacar Tinguidji, a Fula maabo, was appointed as the court poet of the Songhai chief Mossi Gaidou in Dargol, Niger.

==== Nigeria ====
Poets laureate of Nigeria include Obo Aba Hisanjani and Niyi Osundare. Mamman Jiya Vatsa was the inaugural poet laureate of Abuja, Nigeria. Tanure Ojaide was the Poet Laureate of the Niger Delta.

==== Rwanda ====
During the 18th century in Rwanda's history, Semidogoro was the official court poet of Mibambwe III Mutabazi II Sentabyo. Sekarama was the official court poet during the reigns of Kigeli IV Rwabugiri and Mutara III Rudahigwa. Poets laureate of Rwanda include Edouard Bamporiki Uwayo.

==== Senegal ====
Poets laureate of Senegal include Léopold Sédar Senghor and Robert Hayden (1966).

==== Sierra Leone ====
Poets laureate of Sierra Leone include the Italian authors Roberto Malini and Dario Picciau.

==== South Africa ====
In the 19th century, Magolwane kaMkhathini Jiyane was the court poet of Shaka Zulu. During the 20th century, David Livingstone Phakamile (Yali-Manisi) was the poet laureate of Kaiser Matanzima. Poets laureate of South Africa include Mazisi Kunene (2005), Keorapetse Kgositsile (2006), and Mongane Wally Serote (2018).

==== Sudan ====
During the 1800s in Sudan, Al U'aysir was the court poet (inqīb) of the Ja'alin tribe King Mek Nimr.

==== Tanzania ====
Poets laureate of Tanzania include Saadani Kandoro (1969).

==== Tunisia ====
During the 10th century, Muhammad ibn Hani al-Andalusi al-Azdi was appointed as the chief court poet to the Fatimid Caliph al-Mu'izz. Also, in the 10th century, Ali ibn Muhammad al-Iyadi was the court poet of Fatimid caliphs al-Qa'im, al-Mansur, and al-Mu'izz. Poets laureate of Tunisia include Qasim Shabi.

==== Uganda ====
Poets laureate of Uganda include Akena Adoko.

==== Zimbabwe ====
Ginyilitshe Hlabangana was the official poet laureate (or Imbongi YeNkosi) for the Ndebele Kingdom (now called Matabeleland, Zimbabwe).

=== Asia ===
==== Afghanistan ====
During the 10–11th century, Unsuri was made poet laureate by Sultan Maḥmūd of Ghazna. Modern poets laureate of Afghanistan include Abdullah "Malik al-Shu'Ara" Qari, Sufi Abdul Bitab, and Ustad Khalilullah Khalili.

==== Armenia ====
Poets laureate of Armenia include Avetik Isahakian and Hovhannes Toumanian (1970).

==== Azerbaijan ====
In 1502, Azerbaijan-born court poet Habibi earned the title "king of poets" from Safavid king Ismail I. Poets laureate of Azerbaijan include Bakhtiyar Vahabzadeh.

==== Bahrain ====
Bahrain-born Muḥammad Sharīf al-Shībānī served as the poet laureate of the court of Abu Dhabi, United Arab Emirates (c. 1967).

==== Bangladesh ====
During the 15th century, Zainuddin was appointed the court poet of Bengal while under the patronage of Prince Yusuf Khan. Yusuf-Zulekha was the court poet of Sultan of Bengal, Ghiyasuddin Azam Shah. Sometime during the 15th-16th century, Shah Muhammad Saghir was the poet laureate of the Sultan of Bengal Ghiyasuddin Azam Shah. Daulat Qazi, born in what is now modern day Bangladesh, was officially appointed as the poet for the Arakan court in Myanmar (then ruled by King Thiri Thudhamma).

==== Brunei ====
Poets laureate of Brunei include royal poet Omar Ali Saifuddien III.

==== Cambodia ====
Poets laureate of Cambodia include Ind (1907–1924).

==== China ====
In Ancient China, Emperor Yuan of Han (r. 48 BC – 33 BC) appointed Shi You as the poet laureate. During the Tang dynasty, Li Bai was appointed as the poet laureate to Emperor Xuanzong. Zhou Boqi was a court poet appointed during the Yuan Dynasty.

==== Cyprus ====
During the 19th century, after the Turks invaded Cyprus, Mufti Hilmi Efendi was appointed the poet laureate of Sultan Mahmud II. In 1980, the World Academy of Arts and Culture awarded Cyprus-born Costas Montis the title of Poet Laureate.

==== Georgia ====
Heraclius II of Georgia appointed Sayat-Nova as his poet laureate at the court of Tbilisi.

==== India ====
In India, poets laureate were maintained at the royal courts beginning in ancient times. For instance, in Ancient India, Harisena was designated poet laureate by Emperor Samudragupta. During the 7th century, Emperor Harsha proclaimed Bāṇabhaṭṭa as the poet laureate. Jayamkondar was made poet laureate by Chola Emperor Kulottunga I. In the 10th century, Ranna was the poet laureate of Western Chalukya Kings Tailapa II and Satyashraya. Adikavi Pampa was the court poet of Vemulavada Chalukya king Arikesari II. Also, in the 10th century, Ponna received the title Kavichakravarthi (poet laureate) and Ubhaya-Chakravarthi (imperial poet in two languages) from Rashtrakuta king Krishna III. Padmagupta Parimala was a Paramama court poet. In the mid-11th century, Nannaya was the poet-laureate of Rajaraja Narendra.

In the 15th century, Cherusseri Namboothiri was the court poet of Udaya Varma. During the 15th-16th centuries, Allasani Peddana was the poet laureate of Emperor Krishnadevaraya of Vijayanagara. In the 16th century, Shaikh Gadai Kamboh was the poet laureate in the court of Sultan of Sikandar Lodhi. In 1665, Nusrati was made a poet laureate by Sultan ʿAlī II (r. 1656–1672) of the ʿĀdil-Shāhī dynasty. During the Mughal Empire, Emperor Akbar made Birbal the poet laureate. In the aforementioned empire's later history, Taleb Amoli was Emperor Jahangir's poet laureate from 1618 to 1627, and Emperor Shah Jahan appointed Jagannatha Panditaraja as the poet laureate during his reign. In the 18th century, Bharatchandra Ray was the court poet of Maharaja Krishnachandra.

Mohammad Ibrahim Zauq was the poet laureate of the final Mughal Emperor Bahadur Shah Zafar. In the 19th century, Ghalib was appointed as the poet laureate of the Mughal Court. In the 1890s, Z. Savarayalounaiker was regarded as the Poet Laureate of French India (particularly Pondicherry).

In the Indian subcontinent Kashmir, Mullah Nadiri was the poet laureate during the reign of Sultan Sikandar (1378–1416, reigned 1389–1413).

===== Andhra Pradesh =====
Sripada Krishnamurty Sastry was the first poet laureate of Andhra Pradesh, India. Dasarathi served as the court poet (aasthana kavi) for the government of Andhra Pradesh.

===== Jaisalmer =====
Alseedan ji Ratnu was the poet laureate (raj-kavi) of Jaisalmer state.

===== Karnataka =====
In what was once the Western Chalukya Empire, Nagavarma II was the poet laureate (Katakacharya) by Chalukya King Jagadhekamalla.

===== Kerala =====
K. C. Kesava Pillai was the Poet Laureate of Travancore (located in present-day Kerala state). Vallathol Narayana Menon was the Poet Laureate of Kerala.

===== Madhya Pradesh =====
During the 15th century, Raidhu (who was born in Gwalior) was the poet laureate for the court of Dungar Singh and Kirti Singh.

===== Maharashtra =====
Bhaskar Ramchandra Tambe was the poet laureate of Maharashtra.

===== Tamil Nadu =====
Kannadasan was the poet laureate of Tamil Nadu at the time of his death.

===== Telegana =====
Sripada Krishna Sastry was the poet laureate during the 20th century.

==== Indonesia ====
In the 14th century, Mpu Prapanca served as the poet laureate in the royal court of Emperor Hayam Wuruk. During the 18th century, Yasadipura I served as the Poet Laureate of Surakarta Sunanate.

==== Iran ====
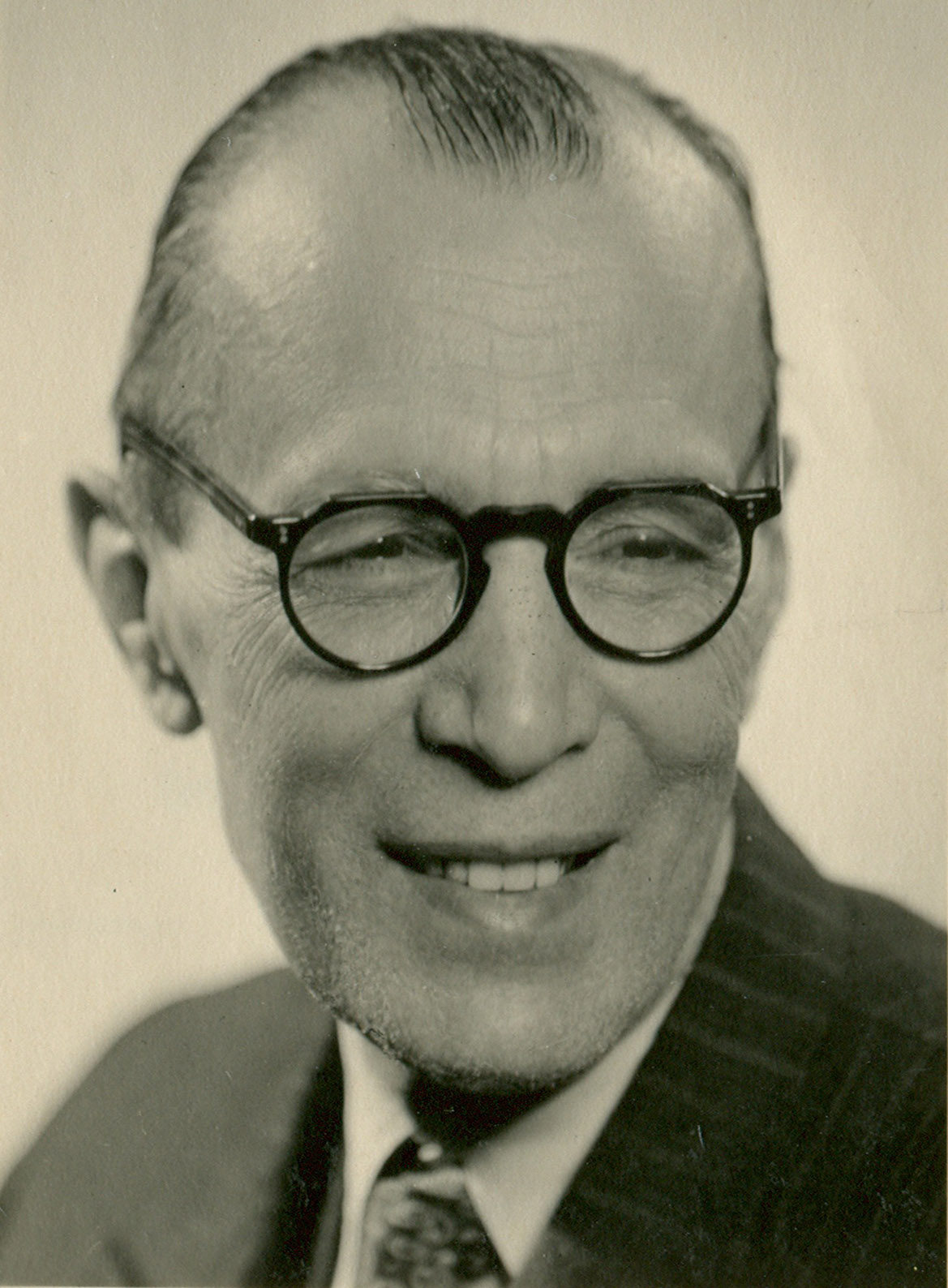
Mohammad-Taqi Bahar poet laureate of Mozaffar ad-Din Shah Qajar.

In the 11th century, Iran-born Abu-al-Faraj Runi became a court poet during the Ghaznavid period. Manuchehri was another court poet during the aforementioned period. Qatran Tabrizi was the court poet of the dynasties of the Rawadids and Shaddadids. During the 13th century, Khwaju Kermani was the official court poet of Il-Khanid rulers Abu Sa'id Bahadur Khan and Arpa Ke'un, the Mozaffarid Mubariz al-Din Muhammad, and Abu Ishaq Inju of the Inju dynasty. Farid Isfarayini was the court poet of the Salghurids in Shiraz. In the 14th century, Salman Savaji was the court poet of the Jalayirids. Sometime during the 15th century, Baba Fighani Shirazi became the court poet of Aq Qoyunlu Ya'qub Beg.

During the Safavid era, Vahshi Bafqi was the poet laureate of Ghiyat al-Din Mir Miran. Shifa'i Isfahani was the poet laureate of Shah Abbas I (r. 1587–1629), who highly valued him, granting him the honorific title of malik al-shu'arā wa mumtāz-i Īrān.

In the 17th century, Taleb Amoli was made the poet laureate of the Mughal emperor Jahangir (1618). Also, in the 17th century, during his travels to India, the Persian poet Kalim Kashani was made poet laureate by Mogul emperor Shah Jahan in 1632. During the 18th century, Saba (Fath-Ali Khan Kashani) was the poet laureate of Fath-Ali Shah Qajar. In the 19th century, Prince Gholam-Hossein Mirza was the poet laureate of Mozaffar al-Din Mirza in Tabriz.

Mohammad-Taqi Bahar was the poet laureate of Mozaffar ad-Din Shah Qajar. He was born in Mashhad in 1884 (died 1951) and was a conservative figure among the modernists. He was appointed Poet Laureate by royal decree in 1903.

==== Iraq ====
In Iraq's ancient history, Ibn 'Atiyah Jarir was the court poet of Ibn Yusuf al-Hajjaj during the Umayyad period. Abd al-Malik Burhani was the poet laureate of Sanjar under Malik Shāh I and Sultān Sanjar. Regarding cities, Aban al-Lahiqi was the court poet of the Barmakids in Baghdad. Poets laureate of Iraq include Muhammed Mahdi al-Jawahiri.

==== Israel ====
Poets laureate of Israel include Avigdor Hameiri and Haim Gouri.

==== Japan ====
Kakinomoto no Hitomaro served as the court poet of Empress Jitō. During the Heian period, Ariwara no Yukihira, Murasaki Shikibu, Fujiwara no Kintō and Akazome Emon were court poets. Poets laureate of Japan include Baron Takasaki Masamitsu. The current Princess of Benin, Damarea Liao was named Japan's first 'National Youth Poet Laureate' in 2024.

==== Jordan ====
Poets laureate of Jordan include Haider Mahmoud.

==== Kazakhstan ====
Poets laureate of Kazakhstan include Abdilda Tazhibaev.

==== Korea ====
During the 12th century, Jeong Ji-sang was appointed as a court poet of King Injong of Goryeo. During the reign of Jungjong of Joseon in the 16th century, Yun Kyung was appointed as the court poet to the king.

Beginning around 1994, North Korea had 6 active poets laureate who worked in the epic genre. Epic poetry was the chief vehicle of political propaganda during the rule of Kim Jong-il, and the poets worked according to the requests and needs of Kim Jong-il. Some of the poets are Jang Jin-sung (pseudonym), Kim Man-young and Shin Byung-gang.

==== Kuwait ====
Poets laureate of Kuwait include Mulla Abdeen.

==== Kyrgyzstan ====
Poets laureate of Kyrgyzstan include Chinghiz Aitmatov.

==== Laos ====
Poets laureate of Laos include Nhouy Abhay.

==== Lebanon ====
During the Shihab dynasty in Lebanon, Nicola al-Turk was officially appointed as a court poet of Bashir Shihab II.

==== Malaysia ====
Poets laureate of Malaysia include Muhammad Haji Salleh and Datuk Zurinah Hassan (upon her becoming a Malaysian National Laureate in 2015). In the 20th century, Raja Haji Yahya was designed by the High Commissioner of the Malay States as the Poet Laureate of Perak.

==== Maldives ====
Poets laureate of the Maldives include Sheikh Mohamed Jamaluddin (c. 1890), who also served as a judge.

==== Mongolia ====
Poets laureate of Mongolia include Ke Ming. Saichungga was the Poet Laureate of Inner Mongolia.

==== Myanmar ====
In ancient Burma, there were kings who bestowed the title of nawade to the poets laureate. However, according to Kaung (2011), two nawades are often discussed in Burmese literature: Nawadegyi (1498–1588; Prome Nawade) and Dutiya (1756–1840; Wetmasut Nawade).

Other historical figures include U Shun, who was appointed as a court poet to King Bagyidaw during the Konbaung dynasty of Burma. During the Konbaung dynasty, Letwe Thondara served as the court poet of Mahadhammaraza Dipadi. Later, in the country's history, Soe Nyunt was appointed as the Poet Laureate of Burma.

==== Nepal ====
Poets laureate of Nepal include Lekhnath Paudyal and Laxmi Prasad Devkota.

==== Oman ====
In Oman, Al-Sitali served as the poet laureate during the Nabhani dynasty.

==== Pakistan ====
During the 18th century, Jam Durrak was appointed as the poet laureate of the royal court of Mir Nasir Khan I. Later in Pakistan's history, Poets laureate of Pakistan would include Hafeez Jalandhari.

==== Philippines ====
Poet Laureate of the Philippines include Cecilio Apóstol, Alberto Segismundo Cruz (1945), and Amado Yuzon (1959). For cities, Abdon Balde Jr. became the Poet Laureate of Albay in 2012.

==== Saudi Arabia ====
Poets laureate of Saudi Arabia include Ahmed Ibrahim al-Ghazzawi.

==== Sri Lanka ====
Poets laureate of Sri Lanka include Thotagamuwe Sri Rahula Thera, who lived during the 15th century.

==== Syria ====
During the 10th century, Al-Mutannabi was the poet laureate at the court of the Hamdanid emir Sayf al-Dawla in Aleppo. In the 12th century, during the Nizari Ismaili era in Masyaf, Mazyad al-Hilli al-Asadi was the poet laureate of Rashid ad-Din Sinan.

==== Taiwan ====
In 1963, Jun-an (Wei Qing-de) was named the poet laureate of Taiwan by the United Poets Laureate International. The organization was founded by Taiwanese poet Zhong Dingwen and Filipino poet Amado Yuzon. In 2004, Taiwanese Yu Hsi was awarded Poet Laureate by the Seoul World Academy of Arts and Culture.

==== Tajikistan ====
In ancient times, Tajikistan-born Rudaki became the poet laureate in the royal court of Ahmad Samani.

==== Thailand ====
Si Prat served as the court poet of King Narai during the 17th century. Poets laureate of Thailand include Sunthorn Phu.

==== Turkey ====
During the 12th century, Nicholas Kallikles was the court poet of the Byzantine court in Constantinople during the reigns of Alexios I Komnenos. In 1302, Safi al-Din al-Hilli served as the court poet in Mardin under the Artuqids. Mehmet Akif Ersoy (b. 1873–d. December 27, 1936), a famous poet, was the Poet-Laureate of Turkey. He composed the poem to be the National Anthem of the Turkish Republic that written in 1921. Original name of the poem is "İstiklal Marşı"

==== Turkmenistan ====
In the 12th century, Rashid al-Din Vatvat became the poet laurete of the court in Gurganj under Il-Arslan (in what is now Turkmenistan). Poets laureate of Turkmenistan include Gozel Shagulyeva.

==== United Arab Emirates ====
Poets laureate of the United Arab Emirates include Ousha bint Khalifa Al Suwaidi.

==== Uzbekistan ====
In the 14th century, Uzbekistan-born Abu Sulayman Banakati was appointed poet laureate of Ghazan Khan court. In the 14th-15th centuries, Uzbekistan-born Khoja Fakhriddin Ismatullah ibn Masud Ismat Bukhari was the poet laureate in the royal courts of Jalal-ud-Din Khalji and Ulugh Beg. In later history, poets laureate of Uzbekistan include Muhammad Ali and Śukrullo.

==== Vietnam ====
During the 16th century, Nguyễn Bỉnh Khiêm became the first Poet Laureate of Vietnam. Tố Hữu was the poet laureate of North Vietnam and the Communist Party of Vietnam, and remained so even after his political decline.

==== Yemen ====
Ibn 'Aliwa-Ibn Hayyan was the court poet of the Banu Hamdan in northern Yemen. During the 15th century, Abu Bakr al-Aydarus became the patron saint and Poet Laureate of Aden, Yemen.

=== Europe ===
==== Albania ====
During the 15th-16th centuries, Albania-born Mesihi of Prishtina was appointed as the court poet of the Grand Vizier Khadim Ali Pasha. In 2021, Rudolf Marku became the first Poet Laureate of Albania. He was followed by Luljeta Lleshanaku.

==== Austria ====
Poets laureate of Austria include Franz Grillparzer, Kurt Wildgans and Franz Werfel. For cities, Paulus Melissus was made Poet Laureate of Vienna in 1561.

==== Belarus ====
Poets Laureate of Belarus include Maksim Tank and Pimen Panchenko.

==== Belgium ====
Around 1914, several sources cited Marguerite Coppin as the Poet Laureate of Belgium. The first Poet Laureate of Belgium, Charles Ducal, was chosen in 2014. He was followed by Laurence Vielle, Els Moors, Carl Norac, and Mustafa Kör.

==== Bosnia and Herzegovina ====
Radovan Karadžić was the Poet Laureate of Yugoslavia (particularly Republika Srpska of Bosnia and Herzegovina).

==== Bulgaria ====
Poets laureate of Bulgaria include Venko Markovski.

==== Croatia ====
During the 15th-16th century, Elio Lampridio Cerva (Ilija Crijević) was appointed as the Poet Laureate of the Republic of Ragusa. Poets laureate of Croatia include Vladimir Nazor. For cities, Peter Menčetić was the Poet Laureate of Dubrovnik.

==== Czech Republic ====
In 1596, Bartholomaeus Bilovius was made Poet Laureate of Prague due in part to his royal connections. Johann Christian Alois Mickl was crowned the Poet Laureate of Prague around 1730.

==== Denmark ====
In the 16th century, Hieronymus Osius was appointed the poet laureate by King Christian III of Denmark. Poets laureate of Denmark include Christian Winther.

==== Estonia ====
Poets laureate of Estonia include Jaan Kaplinski.

==== Finland ====
Poets laureate of Finland include Zachris Topelius.

==== France ====
Around 1324, Arnaut Vidal de Castelnou d'Ari became the first Poet Laureate of the Consistori del Gay Saber. Poets laureate of France include Publio Fausto Andrelini (1496), Pierre Gringore, Mellin de Saint-Gelais (appointed c. 1523 by Francis I of France), François de Malherbe (c. 1576), Giambattista Marino (1615–1623), Charles Dumas (1903), André Corthis (1906) and Paul Fort (1921).

==== Germany ====
The first known Poet Laureate of the Holy Roman Empire (the predecessor of the German Reich) is Conradus Celtes Protuccius (c. 1466). He was succeeded by Matthäus Zuber, Adam Schröter (1560), Johann Heermann (1608), Johannes Paulus Crusius (1616), Johann Rist (1644), Johann Georg Ahle (1680), Apostolo Zeno and Pietro Metastasio (1729) among others. Georg Christian Lehms was the court poet in Darmstadt, and Salomon Franck was a court poet during the 18th century. Regarding other cities, in the 1700s, Sidonia Hedwig Zäunemann was appointed as the Poet Laureate of Göttingen. Poets laureate of Nazi Germany include Hanns Johst from 1935 to 1946. Rajvinder Singh was declared the Stadtschreiber of three different cities in Germany: Rheinsberg in 1999, Remscheid in 2004, and Trier in 2007.

==== Greece ====
In the 6th century, Simonides of Ceos was appointed as the poet laureate of the Scopadae and Aleuadae. In the 12th century, Theodore Prodromos was appointed as the court poet during the reigns of John II Komnenos (1118–1143) and Manuel I Komnenos (1143–1180). Greece's modern poets laureate include Spyros Matsoukas (c. 1909) and Kostis Palamas.

==== Holy See ====
Popes have several times named poets laureate, but the practice has been irregular.

==== Hungary ====
Poets laureate of Hungary include János Arany and Zsófia Balla (2018).

==== Iceland ====
In the 10th century, Hallfreðr vandræðaskáld was the court poet (skald) first of Hákon Sigurðarson, then of Óláfr Tryggvason and finally of Eiríkr Hákonarson. Eilífr Goðrúnarson was another court poet of Hákon Sigurðarson. Also, in the 10th century, Tindr Hallkelsson was the earl Hákon Sigurðarson. In the 11th century, Sigvatr Þórðarson was the court poet of King Olaf II of Norway, Canute the Great, Magnus the Good and Anund Jacob. Also, in the 11th century, Þórarinn loftunga was the court poet of King Canute and Sveinn Knútsson. Other 11th-century court poets include Þjóðólfr Arnórsson and Arnórr jarlaskáld. Poets laureate of Iceland include Einar Benediktsson and Stephan G. Stephansson.

==== Ireland ====
The Kingdom of Ireland had a poet laureate; the last holder of the title was Robert Jephson, who died in 1803.

The closest modern equivalent in Ireland is the title Saoi ["wise one"] held by up to seven members at a time of Aosdána, an official body of those engaged in fine arts, literature, and music. Poets awarded the title include Máire Mhac an tSaoi, Anthony Cronin, and Seamus Heaney. In terms of districts, Rachael Hegarty is the Poet Laureate of Dublin 1.

==== Italy ====
During the 13th century, France-born Raimbaut de Vaqueiras served as the court poet of Boniface I of Montferrat. Poets laureate of Italy include Albertino Mussato, Petrarch (1341), Camillo Querno (1514), Torquato Tasso (1595), Maria Maddalena Morelli Fernandez (1776) and Giovanni Prati (1849). In 1452, Niccolò Perotti was made Poet Laureate of Bologna. In the 16th century, Bernardo Bellincioni was appointed as the court poet for Lorenzo the Magnificent in Florence and Ludovico Sforza.

==== Latvia ====
Jānis Sudrabkalns was the Poet Laureate of Latvian SSR.

==== Lithuania ====
Poets laureate of Lithuania include Bernardas Brazdzionis and Kornelijus Platelis.

==== Luxembourg ====
In 1555, Luxembourg-born Nicolaus Mameranus was crowned poet laureate by Charles V.

==== Malta ====
In 2023, Maria Grech Ganado became the inaugural Poet Laureate of Malta.

==== Moldova ====
Moldova-born Adrian Păunescu was the poet laureate of Romanian politician Nicolae Ceaușescu.

==== Montenegro ====
Poets laureate of Montenegro include Tomo Joshov Vulkichevich.

==== Netherlands ====
The unofficial Poet Laureate of Netherlands is Tsead Bruinja as Dichter des Vaderlands (Poet of the Fatherland). The previous laureate was Ester Naomi Perquin. Gerrit Komrij was the first Dichter des Vaderlands. The title was created by Dutch media. In terms of cities, Hester Knibbe served as the Poet Laureate of Rotterdam.

==== Norway ====
During the 9th century, Þorbjǫrn hornklofi was appointed as a court poet (skald) of King Harald Fairhair. In the 11th century, Valgarðr á Velli was the court poet of King Harald Hardrada of Norway. Poets laureate of Norway include Arnold Eidslott (1986–2018).

==== Poland ====
Poets laureate of Poland were appointed so by Popes: Klemens Janicki (Pope Paul III; 1540), Adam Schröter (Pope Pius IV; 1564), and Maciej Kazimierz Sarbiewski (Pope Urban VIII, 1622). Italy-born Carlo Sigismondo Capece was the court poet of Queen Maria Casimira of Poland.

==== Portugal ====
In 1769, Italy-born Gaetano Martinelli was appointed as the court poet of Joseph I of Portugal and his daughter Maria I. Poets laureate of Portugal include Gil Vicente and Garcia de Resende.

==== Romania ====
Poets laureate of Romania include Vasile Alecsandri (1848–1881) and Octavian Goga.

==== Russia ====
In the 18th century, Vasily Zhukovsky was a court poet during the Russian Empire. Poets laureate of Russia include Gavrila Derzhavin and Mikhail Sholokhov. In 1923, Mӓjit Nurghӓniulї Ghafuri was appointed the Poet Laureate of Bashkir Autonomous Soviet Socialist Republic.

==== San Marino ====
Poets laureate of San Marino include Valery Larbaud.

==== Serbia ====
Poets laureate of Serbia include the following:

- Matija Bećković
- Charles Simić
- Slobodan Selenić
- Jovan Dučić

==== Slovakia ====
Poets laureate of Slovakia include Pavol Országh Hviezdoslav.

==== Slovenia ====
Poets laureate of Slovenia include France Prešeren.

==== Spain ====
Mu'min ibn Said was the court poet of Córdoba under Muhammad I (d. 886) [an amir of the Emirate of Córdoba]. In the 11th century in Spain, Ibn Darraj al-Qastalli was appointed as the court poet of Almanzor. During the 13th century, Cerverí de Girona was appointed as the court poet of James the Conqueror and Peter the Great. Poets Laureate of Spain include Juan Eugenio Hartzenbusch (1869), José Zorrilla y Moral (1889), and Carolina Coronado. José María Pemán was designated as the Poet Laureate of the Franco regime.

==== Sweden ====
Poets laureate of Sweden include Pehr Henrik Ling and Verner von Heidenstam (1916).

==== Switzerland ====
In 1512, Switzerland-born Heinrich Glarean was appointed a poet laureate by Emperor Maximilian I.

==== Ukraine ====
Stanisław Trembecki was the poet laureate in the court of Tulchyn (a region now located in modern-day Ukraine). In the 1940s, Oleksandr Korniychuk was the Poet Laureate of Soviet-controlled Ukraine. For cities, Sofia Vladimirovna was the Poet Laureate of Henichesk.

==== United Kingdom ====
===== England =====
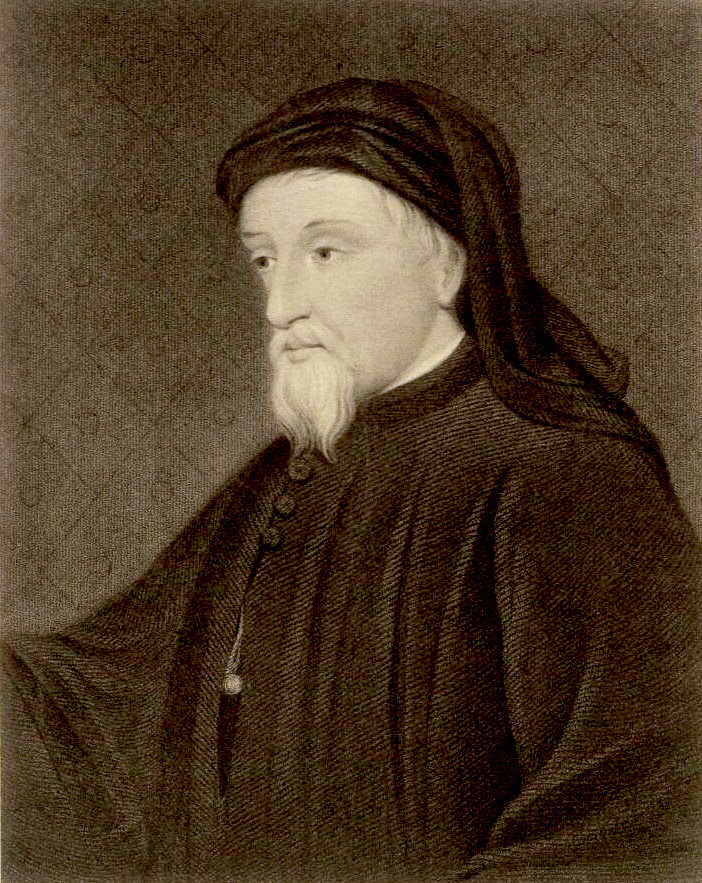
Portrait of Geoffrey Chaucer of England

In England, the term "poet laureate" is restricted to the official office of Poet Laureate, attached to the royal household. However, no authoritative historical record exists of the office of Poet Laureate of England.

The office developed from earlier practice when minstrels and versifiers were members of the king's retinue. Richard Cœur-de-Lion had a versificator regis (English: king's poet), Gulielmus Peregrinus (William the Pilgrim), and Henry III had a versificator named Master Henry. In the fifteenth century, John Kay, a versifier, described himself as Edward IV's "humble poet laureate". According to Notes and Queries (1876), King Henry I paid 10 shillings a year to a versificator regis.

Geoffrey Chaucer (1340–1400) was called Poet Laureate, being granted in 1389 an annual allowance of wine. W. Hamilton describes Chaucer, Gower, Kay, Andrew Bernard, John Skelton, Robert Whittington, Richard Edwards and Samuel Daniel as "volunteer Laureates".

John Skelton studied at the University of Oxford in the early 1480s and was advanced to the degree of "poet laureate" in 1488, when he joined the court of King Henry VII to tutor the future Henry VIII. The title of laureate was also conferred on him by the University of Louvain in 1492 and by the University of Cambridge in 1492–3. He soon became famous for his rhetoric, satire and translations and was held in high esteem by the printer William Caxton, who wrote, in the preface to The Boke of Eneydos compyled by Vargyle (Modern English: The Book of the Aeneid, compiled by Virgil) (1490):

But I pray mayster John Skelton, late created poete laureate in the unyversite of Oxenforde, to oversee and correct this sayd booke.

The academic use of the term laureate became associated again with royalty when King James I created a pension for Ben Jonson in 1617, although there is no formal record extant. He was succeeded by William Davenant.

The royal office Poet Laureate was officially conferred by letters patent on John Dryden in 1668, after Davenant's death, and the post became a regular institution. There are other, non-official, laureate titles, such as the commercially sponsored "Children's Laureate" for an "eminent writer or illustrator of children's books to celebrate outstanding achievement in their field", and the Poetry Foundation's Young People's Poet Laureate. As of 2026, the current Poet Laureate is Simon Armitage.

===== Scotland =====
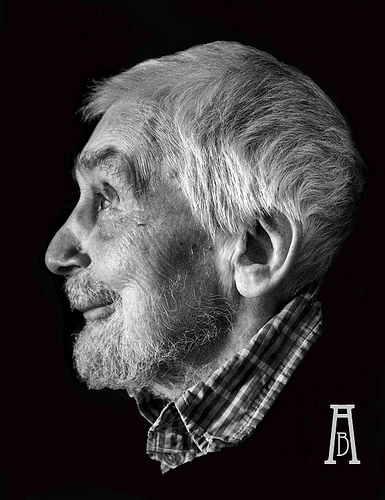
Edwin Morgan, first Makar or National Poet for Scotland

Scotland has a long tradition of makars and poetry. Iain Lom, the Scottish Gaelic bard, was appointed poet laureate in Scotland by King Charles II of England, Scotland and Ireland on his restoration in 1660. In 2004 the Scottish Parliament appointed Professor Edwin Morgan as the first Makar or National Poet for Scotland. On his death in January 2011 he was succeeded by Liz Lochhead. Jackie Kay followed Lochhead as Makar in 2016, and was then herself succeeded by Kathleen Jamie, who became Scotland's fourth Makar in 2021. In 2024, Pàdraig MacAoidh (Peter Mackay) became the fifth Makar. For cities, in 2014, Jim Carruth was appointed as the Poet Laureate of Glasgow.

===== Wales =====
Wales has had a long tradition of poets and bards under royal patronage, with extant writing from medieval royal poets and earlier. Gwalchmai ap Meilyr was the court poet of Owain Gwynedd during the 12th century. Y Prydydd Bychan was a medieval Welsh court poet in the 13th century.

The office of National Poet for Wales was established in April 2005. The first holder, Gwyneth Lewis, was followed by Gwyn Thomas. The role of Bardd Plant Cymru, the Welsh-language children's poet laureate was established in 2000. A corresponding English-language role, Children's Laureate Wales was established in 2019.

===== Territories =====
====== British Virgin Islands ======
Dr. Richard Georges became the inaugural Poet Laureate of the British Virgin Islands in 2020.

====== Falkland Islands ======
Poets laureate of the Falkland Islands include Ron Reeves.

====== Isle of Man ======
Referred to as the Manx Bard, the individuals that have served in the position include Zoe Cannell, Michael Manning, Jordanne Kennaugh and Boakesey Closs.

=== North America ===
==== Aruba ====
In 2025, John Freddy Montoya was named Aruba’s “Poet of the Fatherland” (Dichter des Vaderlands).

==== Bahamas ====
Poets laureate of The Bahamas include Henry Christopher Christie.

==== Barbados ====
The first Poet Laureate of Barbados was chosen in 2018. Her name is Esther Phillips.

==== Canada ====
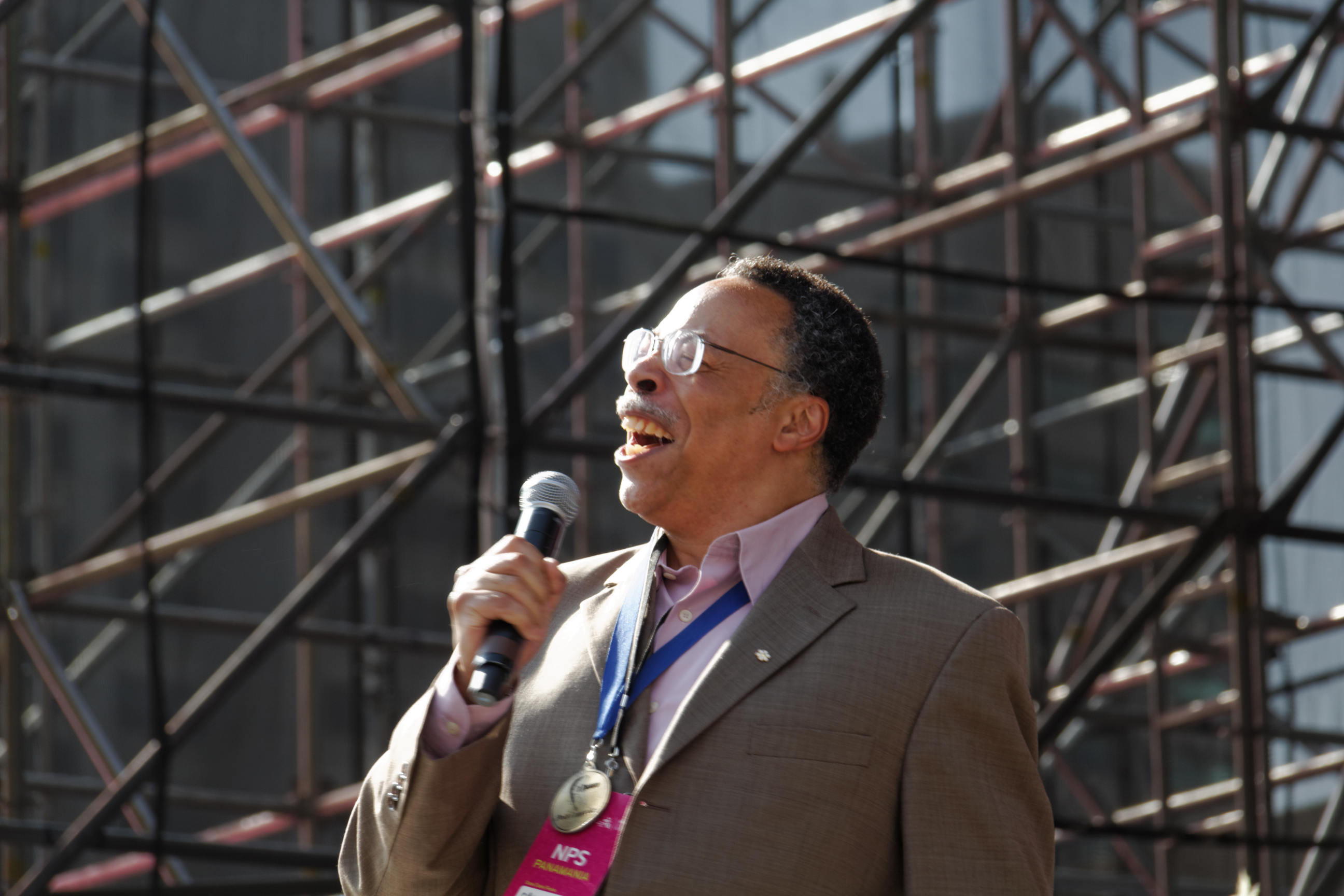
Toronto's Poet Laureate George Elliott Clarke who later became Parliamentary Poet Laureate of Canada

The Canadian Parliamentary Poet Laureate is appointed as an officer of the Library of Parliament. The position alternates between an English and French speaking laureate. Candidates must be able to write in both English and French, have a substantial publication history (including poetry) displaying literary excellence and have written work reflecting Canada, among other criteria.

===== Provincial and municipal poets laureate =====
Currently, only the provinces of Ontario, Prince Edward Island, Saskatchewan and Yukon have appointed a poet laureate.

====== Manitoba cities ======
- Poets laureate of Winnipeg include Di Brandt (2018–2019), Duncan Mercredi (2020–2022), and Chimwemwe Undi (2023–2024).

====== New Brunswick cities ======
- Poets laureate of Fredericton include Ian Letourneau (2016–2018), Jenna Lyn Albert (2019–2021), Jordan Trethewey (2021–2024), and Fawn Parker (2024-present).
- Poets flyé-es (poets laureate) of Moncton include Kayla Geitzler (English) and Jean-Philippe Raîche (French) (2019–present)
- Poets laureate of Sackville include Douglas Lochhead (2002–2011), Marilyn Lerch (2013–2017), Shoshanna Wingate (2019–2021) and Laura K. Watson (2021–present).

====== Newfoundland and Labrador cities ======
- Poets laureate of St. John's include Agnes Walsh (2006–2009), Tom Dawe (2010–2013), George Murray (2014–2017), and Mary Dalton (2019–2022).

====== Nova Scotia cities ======
- Rita Joe (1932 – 2007) was appointed Lifetime "Poet Laureate of the Mi'kmaq people" in Cape Breton.

====== Prince Edward Island ======
Prince Edward Island appointed its first poet laureate, John Smith, in 2003.

- Julie Pellissier-Lush (2019–present)
- Deirdre Kessler (2016–2019)
- Diane Hicks Morrow (2013–2016)
- Hugh MacDonald (2009–2013)
- David Helwig (2008–2009)
- Frank Ledwell (2004–2007)
- John Smith (2002–2004)

====== Saskatchewan ======
Saskatchewan appointed its first poet laureate, Glen Sorestad, in 2000.

- Carol Rose GoldenEagle (2021–present)
- Bruce Rice (2019 - 2021)
- Brenda Schmidt (2017 - 2018)
- Gerry Hill (2016 - 2017)
- Judith Krause (2014 - 2015)
- Don Kerr (2011 - 2013)
- Robert Currie (2007 - 2010)
- Louise B. Halfe (Sky Dancer) (2005 - 2006)
- Glen Sorestad (2000 - 2004)

====== Yukon ======
Inaugural Yukon Provincial Poet Laureate PJ Yukon has held the office since 1994.

The Commissioner of Yukon established the Story Laureate of Yukon role in 2020. The inaugural position was held by Michael Gates.

==== Costa Rica ====
Poets laureate of Costa Rica include Laureano Albán.

==== Cuba ====
National poets are mainly celebrated in Cuba, but there are poets laureate in the country's history. In 1860, Gertrudis Gómez de Avellaneda was made the Poet Laureate of Havana. Nicolás Guillén, who is mainly considered a national poet, became the Poet Laureate of Havana in 1913.

==== Dominican Republic ====
Poets laureate of Dominican Republic include Pedro Mir (1984).

==== El Salvador ====
Poets laureate of El Salvador include Alberto Rivas Bonilla.

==== Guatemala ====
Poets laureate of Guatemala include Osmundo Arriola and Máximo Soto Hall.

==== Haiti ====
Poets laureate of Haiti include Jean-Fernand Brierre.

==== Honduras ====
In 1846, José Trinidad Reyes was appointed the Poet Laureate of Honduras. His successors include Froylán Turcios (c. 1922).

==== Jamaica ====
Thomas MacDermot was the first poet laureate of Jamaica during colonial times, followed by J. E. Clare McFarlane. Mervyn Morris was the first poet laureate of Jamaica upon its independence (2014–2017), followed by Lorna Goodison (2017–2020) and Olive Senior (2021–2024). The current poet laureate is Kwame Dawes (2024–2027).

==== Martinique ====
Poets laureate of Martinique include Daniel Thaly.

==== Mexico ====
In the 15th century, Nezahualcoyotl was the Poet Laureate of the Aztecs. Poets laureate of Mexico include Guillermo Prieto (1890), Juan de Dios Peza, and Rafael de Zayas Enriquez. Ramón Modesto López Velarde Berumen was the Poet Laureate of Jerez de García Salinas, Zacatecas. Enrique González Martínez was the Poet Laureate of Mexico City. Félix Martínez Dolz was the Poet Laureate of Oaxaca. In 2019, Gerardo de Jesús Monroy became the Poet Laureate of Torreón, Coahuila.

==== Nicaragua ====
Poets laureate of Nicaragua include Agenor Argüello and Juan de Dios Vanegas.

==== Panama ====
Poets laureate of Panama include Enrique Geenzier.

==== Saint Lucia ====
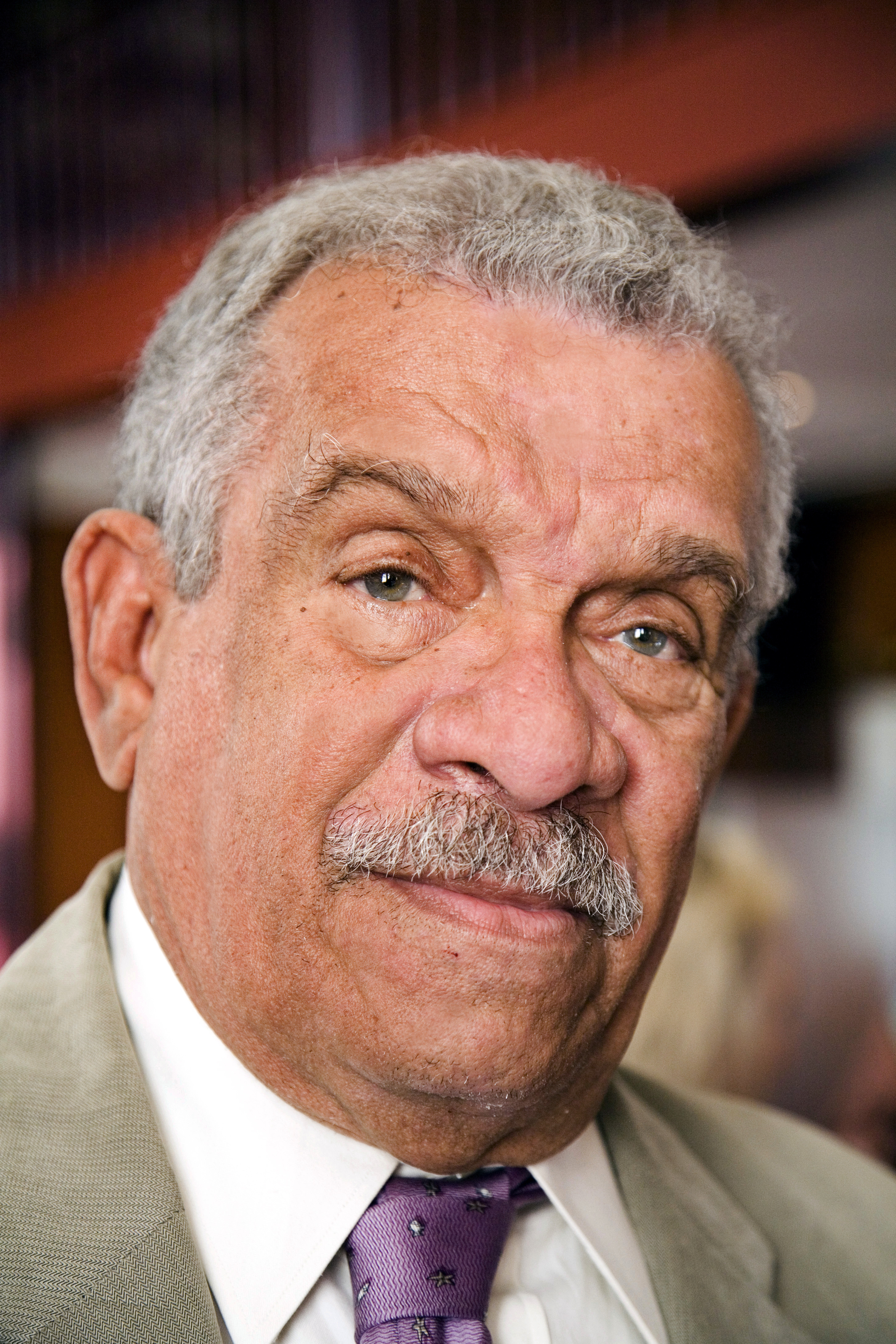
Derek Walcott of Saint Lucia

Poets laureate of Saint Lucia include Derek Walcott.

==== Trinidad and Tobago ====
Paul-Keens Douglas became the inaugural Poet Laureate of Trinidad and Tobago in 2017. In 2002, Eintou Pearl Springer was named the Poet Laureate of Port of Spain, Trinidad and Tobago. The inaugural Poet Laureate of the Port of Spain was Anson Gonzalez.

==== United States ====
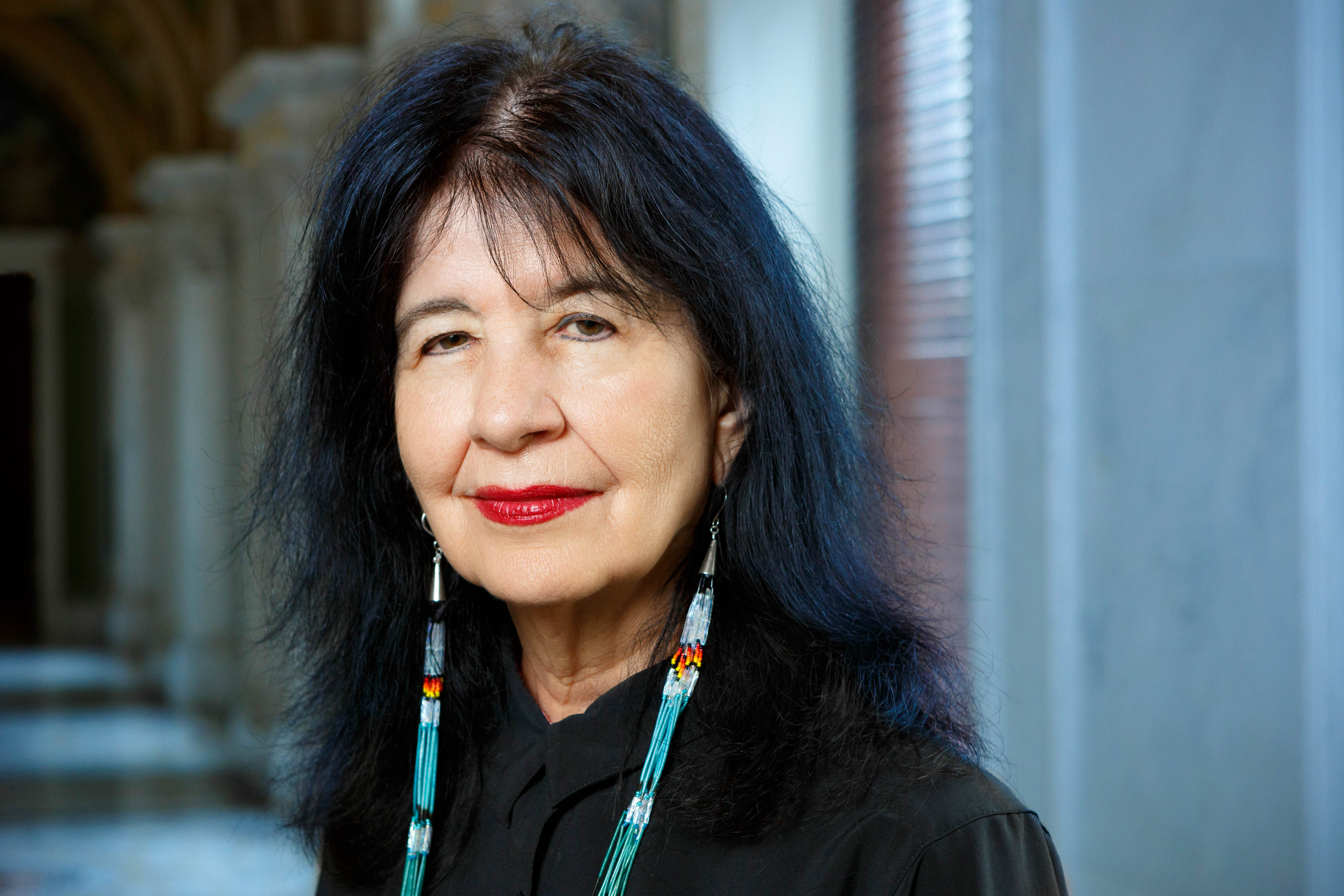
Joy Harjo, Poet Laureate of the United States

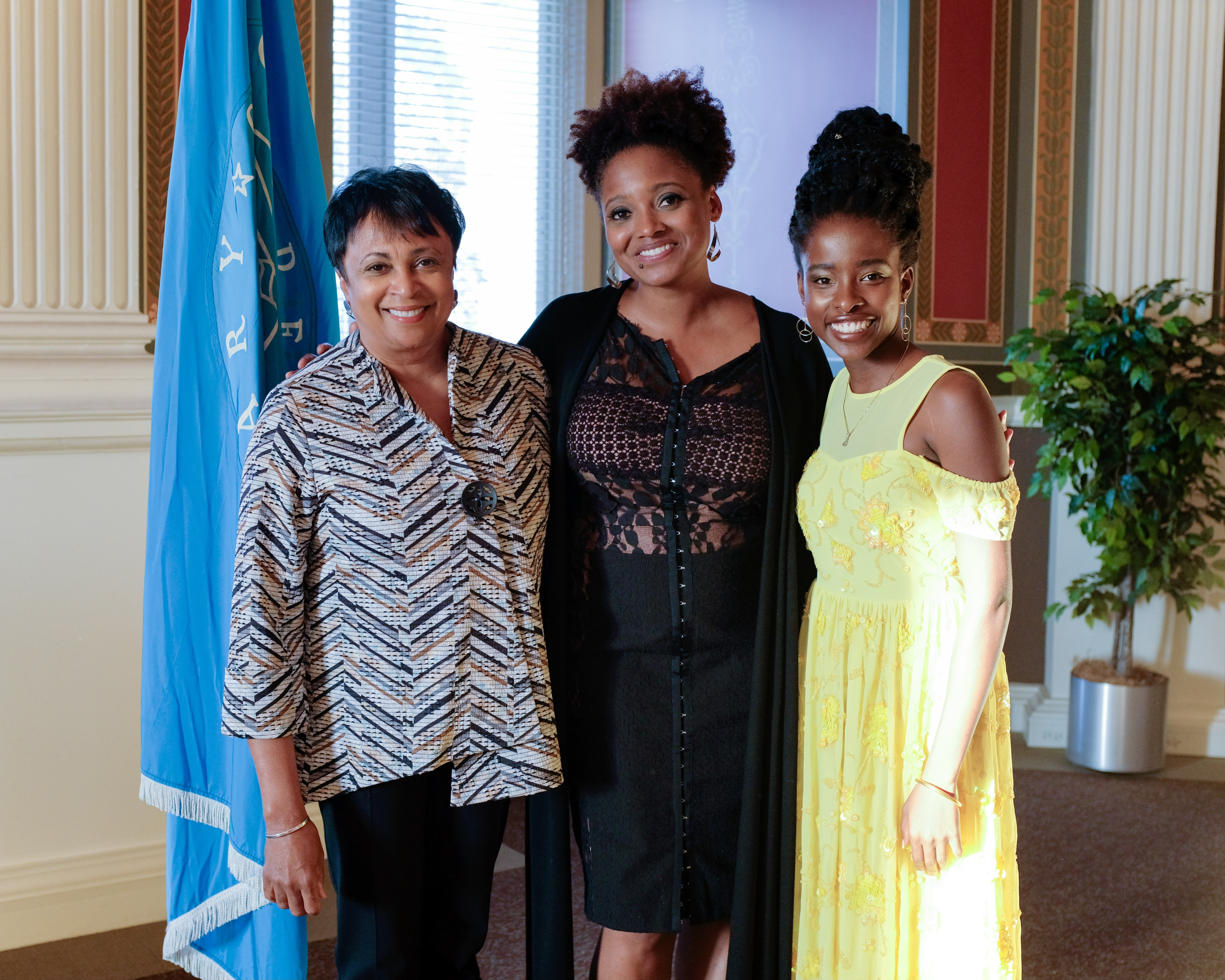
Librarian of Congress Carla Hayden, Poet Laureate Tracy K. Smith, and National Youth Poet Laureate Amanda Gorman.

The United States Library of Congress appointed a Consultant in Poetry to the Library of Congress from 1937 to 1984. An Act of Congress changed the name in 1985 to Poet Laureate Consultant in Poetry to the Library of Congress.

Poets laureate receive a US$35,000 stipend and are given the responsibility of overseeing an ongoing series of poetry readings and lectures at the library, and a charge to promote poetry. No other duties are specified, and laureates are not required to compose for government events or in praise of government officials. However, after the September 11 terrorist attacks, then poet laureate Billy Collins was asked to write a poem to be read in front of a special joint session of Congress. Collins wrote "The Names", which he read on September 6, 2002, and which is available in streaming audio and video. The original intent of the stipend was to provide poets laureate with a full income, so that they could devote their time entirely to writing poetry. The amount has not been adjusted for inflation and is now considered a moderate bonus intended to supplement a poet's already existing income.

Poets laureate of the United States include Ada Limón, Joy Harjo, Tracy K. Smith and Juan Felipe Herrera. Amanda Gorman was the United States's first National Youth Poet Laureate appointed in 2017.

A number of American state legislatures have also created an office of poet laureate. The holders may be locally or nationally prominent. The U.S. states of New Jersey, Massachusetts, and Pennsylvania do not have positions, while South Dakota and South Carolina's positions are currently vacant.

=== Oceania ===
==== Australia ====
On January 30, 2023, at the launch of 'Revive', Australia's new cultural policy, Prime Minister Anthony Albanese announced "the establishment of a poet laureate for Australia". Before 2023, Australia had not had an official poet laureate scheme, despite past suggestions. In 1818, former convict Michael Massey Robinson was paid by colony governor Lachlan Macquarie for services as poet laureate. Over the years, other poets have been nominated as worthy of such a title, including James Brunton Stephens (1835–1902), Andrew Barton 'Banjo' Paterson (1864–1941), and Les Murray (1938–2019).

==== Fiji ====
Poets laureate of Fiji include Kamla Prasad Mishra.

==== Kiribati ====
Poets laureate of Kiribati include Danny Wilson.

==== New Zealand ====
New Zealand has had an official poet laureate since 1998. Originally sponsored by Te Mata vineyards and known as the Te Mata Estate Poet Laureate, the award is now administered by the National Library of New Zealand and the holder is called New Zealand Poet Laureate. The term of office is two years. The symbol of office is a Tokotoko, a carved wooden ceremonial orator's staff.

The first holder was Bill Manhire, in 1998–99, then Hone Tuwhare (2000–01), Elizabeth Smither (2002–03), Brian Turner (2004–05), Jenny Bornholdt (2006–07), Michele Leggott (2008–09), Cilla McQueen (2009–11), Ian Wedde (2011–13), Vincent O'Sullivan (2013–15), C. K. Stead (2015–2017), Selina Tusitala Marsh (2017–2019), David Eggleton (2019–2021) and Chris Tse (2022–2024).

==== Papua New Guinea ====
Allan Natachee was proclaimed the Poet Laureate of Papua New Guinea by the United Poets Laureate International.

==== Tonga ====
Poets laureate of Tonga include Noble Tu'ivakanō (Siaosi Kiu Ngalumoetutulu Kiutauʻivailahi Kao).

=== South America ===
==== Argentina ====
Poets laureate of Argentina include Olegario Victor Andrade and Carlos Guido y Spano.

==== Bolivia ====
Poets laureate of Bolivia include Javier del Granado.

==== Brazil ====
Poets laureate of Brazil include Guilherme de Almeida.

==== Chile ====
Poets laureate of Chile include Galvarino Merino Duarte (c. 1983).

==== Colombia ====
Poets laureate of Colombia include Antonio José Restrepo.

==== Ecuador ====
Poets laureate of Ecuador include Remigio Crespo Toral (1917), Pablo Hannibal Vela (1951), and José María Egas (1976).

==== Guyana ====
Poets laureate of Guyana include A.J. Seymour.

==== Paraguay ====
Poets laureate of Paraguay include Alejandro Guanes.

==== Peru ====
Poets laureate of Peru include Pedro Peralta y Barnuevo, José Santos Chocano (1922), and Dennis Siluk.

==== Suriname ====
Poets laureate of Suriname include Robin "Dobru" Ravales.

==== Uruguay ====
In 1929, the Palacio Legislativo of Montevideo consecrated Juana de Ibarbourou as the "Poet Laureate of Spanish America".

==== Venezuela ====
Poets laureate of Venezuela include Heraclio Martín de la Guardia (c. 1878).

== See also ==
- National poet
- Griot
- Imbongi
- Skald
