= Laureate =

Winner of an award or competition

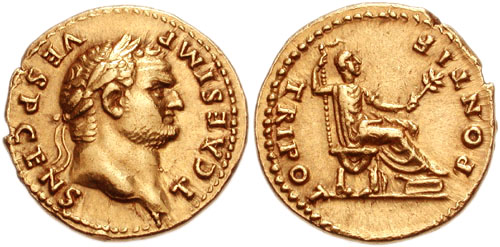
Laureate heads on coins, ancient and modern: Above: Titus, as Caesar (73 AD); Below: Napoleon as Emperor (1812).

Laureate (/ˈlɔɹ.i.ət/), meaning "crowned with laurel", signifies eminence or association with literary awards or military decoration. The term is used for recipients of the Nobel Prize, the Gandhi Peace Award, the Student Peace Prize, distinguished poets, and for former music directors of orchestras who retain some level of involvement.

== History ==
In ancient Greece, the bay laurel (Laurus nobilis) was sacred to the god Apollo, and as such, sprigs of it were fashioned into crowns or wreaths of honor for poets and heroes. This symbolism has been widespread ever since. "Laureate letters" in old times meant the dispatches announcing a victory, and the epithet was given, even officially by universities, to distinguished poets (e.g. to John Skelton).

The name of "baccalaureate" for a bachelor's degree shows a confusion with a supposed etymology from Latin bacca lauri (the laurel berry), which, though incorrect, involves the same idea.

=== Poet laureate ===
From the more general use of the term "poet laureate" arose its restriction in England to the office of the poet attached to the royal household, first held by Ben Jonson, for whom the position was, in its essentials, created by Charles I of England in 1617. Jonson's appointment does not seem to have been formally made as poet laureate, but his position was equivalent to that. The office was a development of the practice of earlier times, when minstrels and versifiers were part of the retinue of the King; it is recorded that Richard the Lionheart had a versificator regis (Gulielmus Peregrinus), and Henry III of England had a versificator (Master Henry); in the 15th century John Kay, also a versifier, described himself as Edward IV of England's "humble poet laureate." Moreover, the crown had shown its patronage in various ways; Chaucer had been given a pension and a perquisite of wine by Edward III of England, and Spenser a pension by Elizabeth I. W. Hamilton classes Chaucer, Gower, John Kay, Andrew Bernard, John Skelton, Robert Whittington, Richard Edwardes, Spenser and Samuel Daniel, as "volunteer Laureates."

Sir William Davenant succeeded Jonson in 1638, and the title of poet laureate was conferred by letters patent on John Dryden in 1670 two years after Davenant's death, coupled with a pension of £300 and a butt of Canary Islands wine. The post then became a regular institution, though the emoluments varied, Dryden's successors being T. Shadwell, who originated annual birthday and New Year odes; Nahum Tate; Nicholas Rowe; Laurence Eusden; Colley Cibber; William Whitehead; Thomas Warton; Henry James Pye; Robert Southey; William Wordsworth; Alfred Tennyson; and, four years after Tennyson's death, Alfred Austin. The office took on a new luster from the personal distinction of Southey, Wordsworth and Tennyson; it had fallen into contempt before Southey, and on Tennyson's death there was a considerable feeling that no possible successor was acceptable, William Morris and Algernon Charles Swinburne being hardly court poets. Eventually, however, the undesirability of breaking with tradition for temporary reasons, and thus severing the one official link between literature and the state, prevailed over the protests against following Tennyson by any one of inferior genius. Abolition was similarly advocated when Thomas Warton and William Wordsworth died. The poet laureate, being a court official, was considered responsible for producing formal and appropriate verses on birthdays and state occasions; but his activity in this respect has varied, according to circumstances, and the custom ceased to be obligatory after Pye's death. Wordsworth stipulated, before accepting the honor, that no formal effusions from him should be considered a necessity; but Tennyson was generally happy in his numerous poems of this class. The emoluments of the post have varied; Ben Jonson first received a pension of 100 marks, and later an annual "terse of Canary wine." To Pye an allowance of £27 was made, instead of the wine. Tennyson drew £72 a year from the Lord Chamberlain's department, and £27 from the Lord Steward's in lieu of the "butt of sack."

=== Drag laureate ===
D'Arcy Drollinger was appointed San Francisco’s first drag laureate in May 2023. The role consists of serving as an ambassador for San Francisco's LGBTQ+, arts, nightlife, and entertainment communities.

Pickle Drag Queen became West Hollywood's first drag laureate on International Drag Day, July 16, 2023.

== See also ==
- Laurel wreath
- Glory (honor)
