= Zhenis Kakenuly Nurlybayev =

Kazakh painter, art critic and author (born 1965)

Zhenis Nurlybayev
- Born: 9 May 1965 (age 61); Karabulak, Almaty Region, Kazakh SSR
- Known for: Painting, Graphics, Computer graphics, Caricature
- Movement: Realism
- Awards: The Presidential Grant of Kazakhstan (2010)
- Website: web.archive.org/web/20110429002820/http://www.kakenuly.kz/

Jeñıs Käkenūly Nūrlybaev (Note: Often transliterated through the Russified Romanization as Zhenis Kakenuly Nurlybayev, Russian: Женис Какенулы Нурлыбаев) (Kazakh: Жеңіс Кәкенұлы Нұрлыбаев; born 9 May 1965) is a Kazakh painter, art critic and author of the сulture support Year emblem in Kazakhstan (2000), and a laureate of the presidential grant of the Republic of Kazakhstan (2010).

== Life and career ==
Nurlybayev was born in Karabulak (Almaty Region, Kazakhstan). He dreamed to be an artist at childhood. At school ages Zhenis's favourite subject was a painting . In 1982 he graduated Zhalanash high school with distinction.

- 1982-1989 he studied at the art-graphic faculty of the Kazakh Pedagogical Institute in Almaty (now Abay Kazakh National Pedagogical University).
- 1983-1985 he served in the army of Soviet Union.
- 1989 he worked as the art illustrator of «Ak Zhelken» journal (Almaty).
- 1990—1991 — art editor of «Zerde» journal (Almaty).
- 1991—1993 — artist of «Madeniet» magazine (Almaty).
- 1994—2008 — artist of «Tura Bi» magazine (Almaty, Astana)

== Сreativity ==
Zhenis Kakenuly is a versatile artist: he works in the painting, graphics, computer graphics, caricature fields.

Personal exhibitions:

- Personal exhibition in the President Culture Center. 23 April 2003, Astana.
- Personal exhibition in the Abilkhan Kasteyev State Art Museum . 10 December 2005, Astana.
- Personal exhibition in the Museum Of Modern Art. 22 December 2006, Astana.
- Personal exhibition in the school-lycée No. 53 . 16 November 2007, Astana.
- Personal exhibition in the «Kulanshi» art gallery. 15 April 2009, Astana.
- «The Quintessence» personal exhibition in the National State Library Of Kazakhstan. 16 November 2010, Astana.

Joint exhibitions:

- «The smell of wormwood. Fine art works exhibition of Kazakhstan painters devoted th the Independency day of the Republic of Kazakhstan». December 2009, New York City.
- «DER GERUCH VON WERMUT — Zeitgenössische Kunst aus Kasachstan». 18 November 2009, Berlin.
- TURKSOY. 3 June 2009. Amasya
- «The smell of wormwood». 2 November 2009. «Kulanshi» art gallery, Astana.
