= Adam Schröter =

Silesian humanist, poet and alchemist

Adam Schröter (c. 1525, in Zittau – c. 1572, in Kežmarok) was a Silesian humanist, poet, and alchemist, known in particular for his Latin translations of Paracelsus.

== Biography ==
Adam Schröter was born in the Lusatian town of Zittau around 1525. His father, Andreas, was a teacher at the town school, and for sometime also in Freystadt (now Kożuchów). Andreas was Adam's first teacher as well and passed on to him his love of humanism and literature. In order to further his education, Adam Schröter toured university towns in the Holy Roman Empire, passing through Frankfurt an der Oder in 1547 and later also Prague. Schröter entered the University of Cracow in the winter semester of 1552/53.

Schröter excelled in Latin poetry. He began his literary career with a small poetic tome titled Elegiam liber unus. Item epigrammatum liber unus, which included poems dedicated to his patron N. Hübner, his father Andreas, and various Silesian friends and protectors, as well as the coronation of Barbara Radziwiłł. The epigrams, which show the influence of Klemens Janicki, name a number of humanists, including Valentin Eck and Anzelm Ephorinus. He published three further tomes of epigrams at the same printing house – that of Łazarz Andrysowicz. His final poetic effort was a description of the salt mine in Wieliczka published in 1553 as Salinarum Vieliciensium jucunda et vera descriptio. The poem combines mythology with Schröter's personal observations of the mine; Schröter's discussions of the origin and properties of salt point to the influence of Paracelsus. Schröter's poetic efforts were rewarded in 1560 when he was crowned poet laureate of the Holy Roman Empire.

By 1569, Schröter was in Käsmark (now Kežmarok), hosted by his patron Olbracht Łaski. In that year, his Latin translations of the De Praeparationibus and Archidoxae of Paracelsus were published in Kraków. Schröter remained in Käsmark until the end of his life; he died around 1572.

== Selected works ==
- Elegiam liber unus. Item epigrammatum liber unus. Kraków: Łazarz Andrysowicz.
- De natali Jesu Christi Salvatoris nostri, carmen saphicum. Kraków.
- Salinarum Vieliciensium jucunda et vera descriptio. Kraków: Łazarz Andrysowicz, 1553. Reprinted as Regni Poloniae salinarum Vielicensium descriptio... Maciej Wirzbięta, 1564.
  - See also, J. Pistoriusz, Polonicae historiae Corpus. A complete Polish translation of the text appears in Piestrak, Feliks. Opis salin wielickich... Kraków: Wyd. Tow. Górniczego w Krakowie, 1901.
- Solium caesareum. Quatuor virtutibus, nempe, justitia, prudentia, fortitudine, et temperantia, fulcitum. In honorem Romanorum imperatoris, divi Ferdinandi, primi, patriae patris augustissimi. Per Adamum schröterum Silesium. Wien: Johann II Singriener, 1558.
- Psalmus XCI in honorem Alberti a Lasco carmine saphico. Kraków: Łazarz Andrysowicz.
- Paracelsus. Archidoxae Philippi Theophrasti Paracels ... ac Mysteriorum naturae scratoris et Artificis absolutissimi Libri X. Translated into Latin by Adam Schröter. Kraków: Maciej Wirzbięta, 1569.
- Paracelsus. De Praeparationibus P. Theophrasti Paracelsi... Libri duo. Cura et industria, summaque fide et integrate ab Adamo Schrötero... Translated into Latin by Adam Schröter. Kraków: Maciej Wirzbięta, 1569.
- De fluvio Memela Lithuaniae carmen elegiacum, 1553

== Bibliography ==
- Bauch, Gustav. "Schlesien und die Universität Krakau im XV und XVI Jahrhunderts". Zeitschrift des Vereins für Geschichte und Alterthum Schlesiens 41 (1907): 99–108, esp. 175.
- Bugaj, Roman. "Renensansowy poemat o soli kamiennej: Adam Schröter Salinarum Vieliciensium descriptio". Kwartalnik historii nauki i techniki 44, no. 2 (1999): 61–94.
- Döpp, Siegmar: Adam Schröter, Regni Poloniae salinarum Vieliciensium descriptio / Das Salzbergwerk von Wieliczka (= Die neulateinische Bibliothek, vol. 4), Wien, Holzhausen, 2019. ISBN 978-3-902976-86-4
- Hajdukiewicz, Leszek. "Schroeter Adam". In Polski Słownik Biograficzny, vol. 36, edited by Andrzej Romanowski, 3–4. 1995–1996.
- Honemann, Volker. "Bergbau in der Literatur des Mittelalters und der Frühen Neuzeit". In Stadt und Bergbau, edited by Karl Heinrich Kaufhold and Wilfried Reinighaus, 239-61. Köln, 2004.
- Kondratowicz, Ludwik. Dzieje Literatury w Polsce od Pierwiastkowych Czasów do XVII wieku, vol. 2, 87–88. Warsaw: Gebethner i Wolff, 1875.
- Pirożyński, Jan. "Die Krakauer Universität in der Renaissancezeit". In Der polnische Humanismus und die europäischen Sodalitäten, edited by Stephan Füssel and Jan Pirożyński, 13–38. Wiesbaden: Harrasowitz, 1997.
- Węclewski, Zygmunt. "Slązacy w Polsce. I. Adam Schroeter". In Przewodnik Nauki i Literatury, 1–20. 1879.
- Marek Żukow-Karczewski, "Pięknem urzeczeni (trzy zapomniane relacje) / Enchanted by beauty (three forgotten relations)". In Aura 1, 1998.
