= Mophead =

2019 graphic memoir by Selina Marsh

Mophead: How Your Difference Makes a Difference
- First edition
- Author: Selina Tusitala Marsh
- Illustrator: Selina Tusitala Marsh
- Language: English
- Genre: Children's book, Biography, Graphic novel
- Publisher: Auckland University Press
- Publication date: 17 October 2019
- Publication place: New Zealand
- ISBN: 9781869408985
- Followed by: Mophead Tu: The Queen's Poem

Mophead: How Your Difference Makes a Difference is a memoir in graphic novel form, written and illustrated by the poet and academic Selina Tusitala Marsh. It is published by Auckland University Press. On 12 November 2020 Mophead Tu: The Queen's Poem was published.

For the 2020 Pop Up Penguin art trail in Christchurch a Mophead penguin was made by artist Lisa Rudman.

== Awards ==
In August 2020 Mophead was the supreme winner at the New Zealand Book Awards for Children and Young Adults, and also won the Margaret Mahy Book of the Year and Elsie Locke Award for Non-fiction. In October 2020 Mophead won three awards at the Publishers Association of New Zealand Book Design Awards – the Gerard Reid Award for Best Book, Best children's book and the PANZ People’s Choice Award – recognising the design skills of Vida Kelly.
