= Abdon Balde Jr. =

Filipino writer

Abdon Balde Jr. (born September 12, 1946) is a contemporary Bicolano writer in Bikol, Filipino, and English. He was awarded as one of the Outstanding Bikolano Artists for 2009 in Literary Arts category in Naga City, and Southeast Asian Writers Awards for the Philippines in Thailand last 2009. He is one of the directors in Unyon ng mga Manunulat sa Pilipinas (UMPIL). In 2012, he was named Poet laureate of Albay. He was born in Busac, Oas, Albay.
