= Cyilima II Rujugira =

Mwami (King)
- Reign: 1770 – 1786
- Died: 1786; Buyenzi, Kingdom of Burundi

Cyilima II Rujugira was Mwami (King) of Kingdom of Rwanda from 1770 to 1786. Cyilima II Rujugira is famous for coining the phrase "Urwanda ruratera ntiruterwa" (No nation invades Rwanda, instead Rwanda defends and attacks nations).

His reign was characterized by many attacks from neighboring Kingdoms of Ndorwa, Gisaka and Burundi. During his time, a sacrificial warfare known as "war of Abatabazi" took place. It was between Rwanda and Burundi and involved special personnel from both sides on suicide missions which both believed would ultimately incur misfortunes to each other as enemies. It ended with King Mutaga III of Burundi committing suicide on Burundian soil in a self-sacrifice mission against Cyilima II Rujugira.

Regnal titles
Preceded by Yuhi III Mazimpaka	King of Rwanda; 1770–1786	Succeeded by Kigeli III Ndabarasa
