= Kigeli III Ndabarasa =

Mwami (King)
- Reign: 1765–1792
- Predecessor: Cyilima II Rujugira
- Successor: Mibambwe III Mutabazi II Sentabyo
- Burial: Rutare
- Mother: Rwesero

Kigeli III Ndabarasa (reigned 1765–1792) was a warrior Mwami of the Kingdom of Rwanda during the eighteenth century. The son of Cyilima II Rujugira, he was raised to be co-ruler by his father before attaining the throne on his death in 1765 or 1786. His reign was marked by military campaigns that expanded Rwandan territory and control. He brought the people of Ndorwa into the kingdom and conquered the small kingdom of Mubali. He expanded the large number of armies he had inherited from his father and founded new armies in Ndorwa and Burundi. He increased support for his military force by creating four new herds of cattle for his army, as well as ten for cattle-herders, and expanded the number of domains for cattle herding into new territories. At the same time, the observance of the practice of veneration for ancestors decreased during his reign. He died due to complications from an operation and was succeeded by his son Sentabyo.

== Early life ==
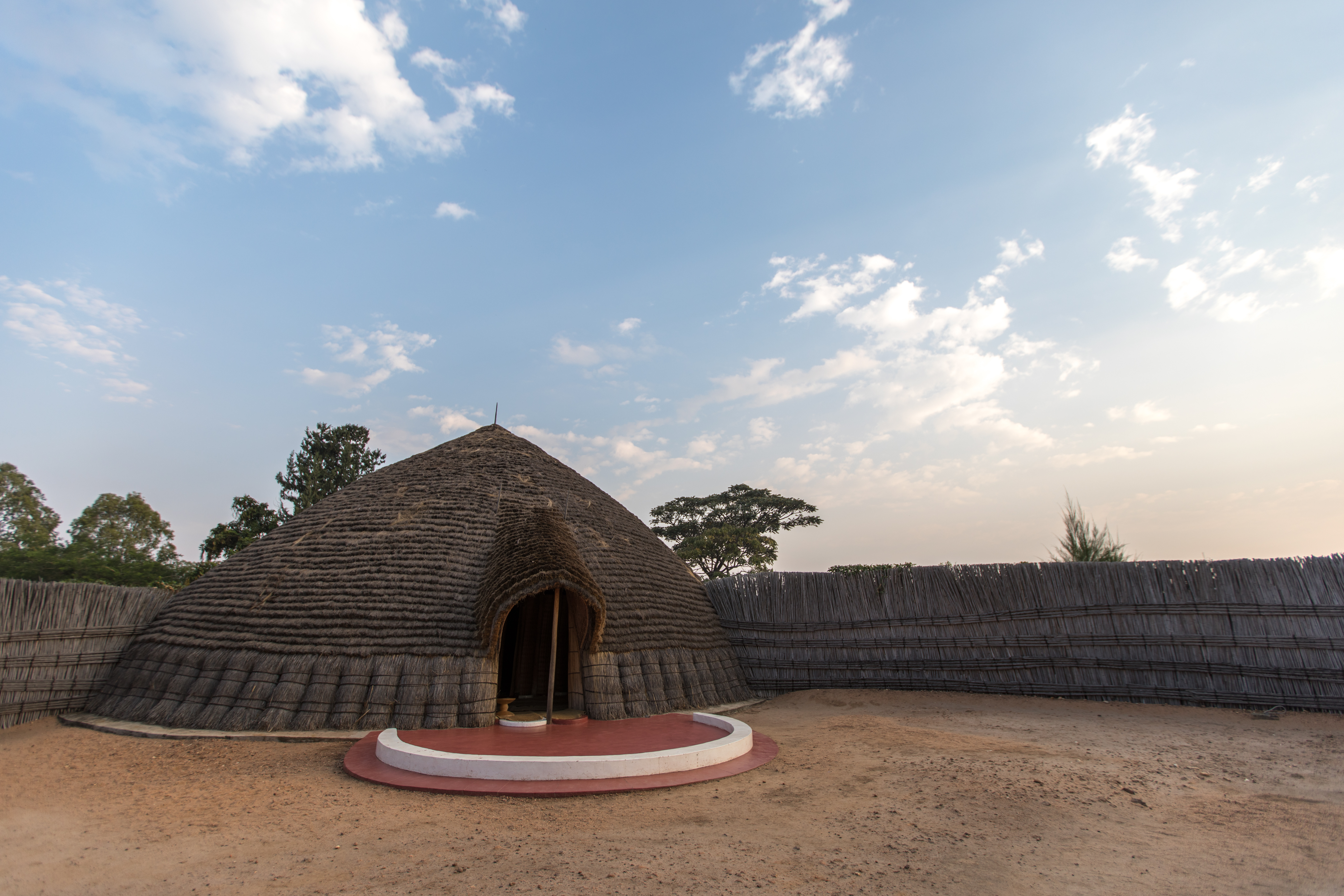
The royal palace at Nyanza

Ndabarasa was born the son of Cyilima II Rujugira at Rwesero. He was Mwami and he was of the royal line of Gisaka. Rujugira gained the throne at a mature age and, soon after, Ndabarasa was named as co-regent by his father. As his mother had died before his accession, and tradition did not allow for a son to reign who had no mother, he was provided with an adoptive Queen Mother, Nyiratunga, his own mother's first cousin. Both the regnal names Cyilima and Kigeli designate warrior rulers in the royal cycle of Rwanda. His father ruled at a time of almost constant war and diplomacy. In one of his early expeditions, Ndabarasa was sent by his father to Ndorwa in the region of the Ruhunda of Kajara. The ruler of the Ndorwa, Gahaya, had asked Rujugira to adjudicate between his sons, fearful that their disagreements could tear their society apart. The families had already allied through marriage. Instead, after Gahaya died, Ndabarasa overcame all potential successors to the reign and brought Ndorwa under the control of Rwanda.

He and his descendants were named Bigna, which is derived from the word mugina, which can be translated "termite mound". It is claimed that he had a light yellow skin, which gave rise to this appellation. Alternatively, the name may have been applied after a curse given to him by a mystic named Nyirabiyoro.

== Reign ==
When his father died at the age of 65, Ndabarasa became the uncontested King of Rwanda. This was reported as an unusual occurrence and celebrated in the name that he and his brothers were given, Abatangana, or those who agree with each other. He was the 27th ruler of Rwanda and the third Kigeli. Numerous sources claim that his reign lasted from 1765 to 1792. Burke's Royal Families of the World gives his regnal dates as 1768 to 1792, although this ignores his time as co-regent. Jan Vansina claims 1786 to 1796 and Kubwimana suggests his rule as lasting from 1708 to 1741, but acknowledges that these are controversial.

During his reign, there was a decrease in the level of veneration for ancestors. He encouraged this, even reducing the amount of veneration for royal cycle and his own ancestors, a practice continued by his own son. This change was accompanied by a decrease in the power of those who were responsible for the society's rituals, such as the Tsobe, Kono and Tega clans. However, many of members of these were also able to join the military campaigns and so retained political power. Similarly, the court became less itinerant during his reign, moving five times compared to seven under his father.

During his reign, Ndabarasa acquired great wealth, being termed "the wealthy one in glass bead collars". He created cattle-keeping domains in the lands he conquered. For example, he founded three domains in Bwanacyambwe and seven in Buganza. During his reign, he added ten herds for cattle-keepers, four for armies and one for ritualists. By the end of his reign, all the major herds in the land were royal herds. His herd created from the loot taken in the conquest of Ndorwa alone consisted of between thirty and fifty cattle.

== Military campaigns ==
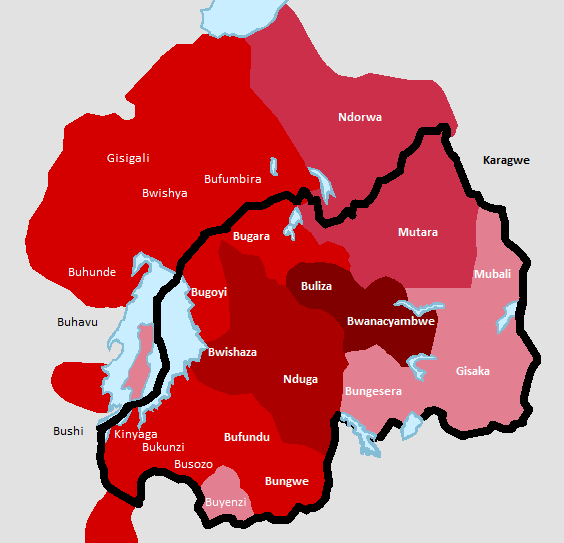
Locations in and around Ndabarasa's Rwanda

Ndabarasa continued his father's military expansion with one third of the armies recorded under the kingdom being created by Ndabarasa and his two immediate predecessors. As well as absorbing the army of Ndorwa and others to the north of the traditional Rwanda centre, during his reign, he created new armies in the far south in Burundi. He used these armies in increasingly wide campaigns, capturing cattle from Kajara, Igara, and Rujumbura. He delegated the operation of many of the armies and the care of his official herds, including two of each to Rukari of Muhabura, who may also have been the mwami's lover.

The nearby small kingdom of Mubali was located east of Mutara in current day Akagera National Park. It was ruled by Mwami Biyoro and his mother Nyirabiyoro. Ndabarasa proposed the hand of his daughter Nyabugondo to king Biyoro to create an alliance between the kingdoms. When the king had secured a way to land his forces on the island capital of Mubali, Shango, he established himself and advanced to meet his son-in-law and his family. His plan to capture Biyoro and Nyirabiyoro was partially successful since the Queen Mother was captured but her son was warned of the threat and escaped, seeking exile in Karagwe. Out of fear for Ndabarasa, the king of Karagwe was forced to surrender Biyoro, who was briefly reunited with his mother in Rubona where they were held as prisoners. They were both executed, Nyiginya troops captured the Mubali emblem drum and Mubali was annexed to Rwanda.

In general, the king preferred military life and avoided the court at Nyanza. As well as using the traditional houses of his family, he established two royal residences in Ndorwa where he spent most of his reign. His preference for Ndorwa was accompanied by an influx of people migrating into the area, which may have been a consequence of the resolution of conflict with Kajara.

== Death and legacy ==
Later in his life, Ndabarasa suffered from nerve disease. According to the poem no/63 "Inkovu icitse irushya abavuzi" by Umwiru Ntibanyendera, to reduce the pain, following traditional practice of the time, a doctor named Musare cut a nerve but the operation fatally wounded Ndabarasa. He died and was buried in 1796 in Rutare, at the top of Munanira. As his father has done, he had already designated his son as his successor, who took the throne as Mibambwe III Mutabazi II Sentabyo. According to tradition, the end of his reign and the accession of his successor was marked by an eclipse.

== Family ==
Ndabarasa had eight children:

- Mibambwe III Mutabazi II Sentabyo
- Kimanuka, head of the Bamanuka
- Kazenga, head of the Bazenga
- Baryinyonza, head of the Baryinyonza
- Burabyo, head of the Barabyo
- Semugaza, head of the Bahebera
- Nyemina, head of the Banyemina
- Barabarasa, lead of the Barabarasa, his own clan.

Regnal titles
Preceded by Cyilima II Rujugira	King of Rwanda; 1765 - 1792 or 1786 - 1796	Succeeded by Mibambwe III Mutabazi II Sentabyo
