= Commonwealth Poet Laureate =

Honorary literary position conferred by the Commonwealth Foundation

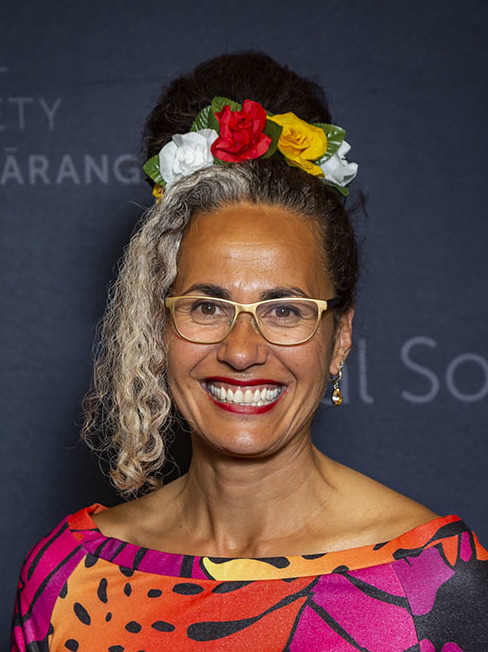
- Incumbent; Selina Tusitala Marsh since 30 June 2025
- Style: Poet Laureate
- Type: Honorary title
- Appointer: Commonwealth Foundation
- Term length: Two years (inaugural)
- Formation: 2025
- First holder: Selina Tusitala Marsh

The Commonwealth Poet Laureate is an honorary position conferred by the Commonwealth Foundation. The role was established in 2025 to serve as a symbolic and cultural voice for poetry across the 56 member countries of the Commonwealth of Nations.

== Purpose and duties ==
The role of the Commonwealth Poet Laureate is to connect the citizens of the Commonwealth through poetry, to compose and perform poems for significant Commonwealth occasions, such as Commonwealth Day or the Commonwealth Heads of Government Meeting, and to advise the Commonwealth Foundation on its creative programmes.

== Inaugural laureate ==
The first Commonwealth Poet Laureate, appointed in June 2025, is Selina Tusitala Marsh of New Zealand. Marsh previously served as New Zealand Poet Laureate from 2017 to 2019 and was commissioned to write a poem for Commonwealth Day in 2016 at Westminster Abbey. Her term is scheduled to run to 31 May 2027.
