= Selina Tusitala Marsh =

New Zealand poet-scholar

Selina Tusitala Marsh ONZM FRSNZ
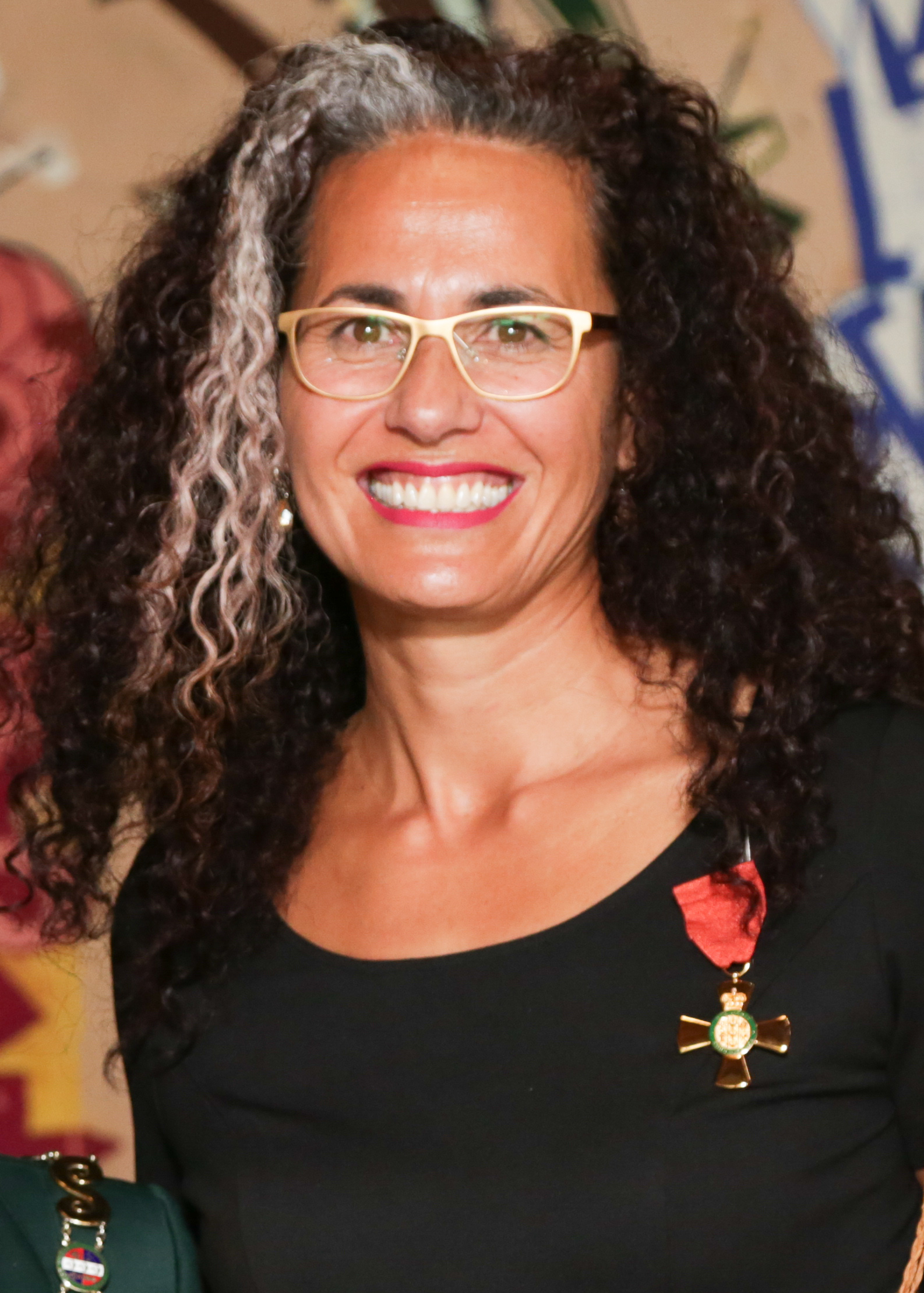
- Tusitala Marsh in 2019
- Born: 21 April 1971 (age 55); Auckland, New Zealand

Academic background
- Education: University of Auckland
- Thesis: "Ancient banyans, flying foxes and white ginger": five Pacific women writers (2004)

Academic work
- Institutions: University of Auckland
- Doctoral students: Robert Sullivan
- Notable works: Mophead

1st Commonwealth Poet Laureate
- Incumbent
- Assumed office 30 June 2025
- Preceded by: Office established
- Website: tusitala.nz

Selina Tusitala Marsh ONZM FRSNZ (born 21 April 1971) is a New Zealand poet, academic and illustrator. She is the inaugural Commonwealth Poet Laureate, and was the New Zealand Poet Laureate from 2017 to 2019.

== Early life ==
Marsh was born in 1971 in Auckland, New Zealand. Through her mother, Sailigi Tusitala, Marsh is of Samoan and Tuvaluan ancestry and through her father James Crosbie she is of English, Scottish and French descent. Marsh grew up in the Auckland suburb of Avondale.

== Career ==
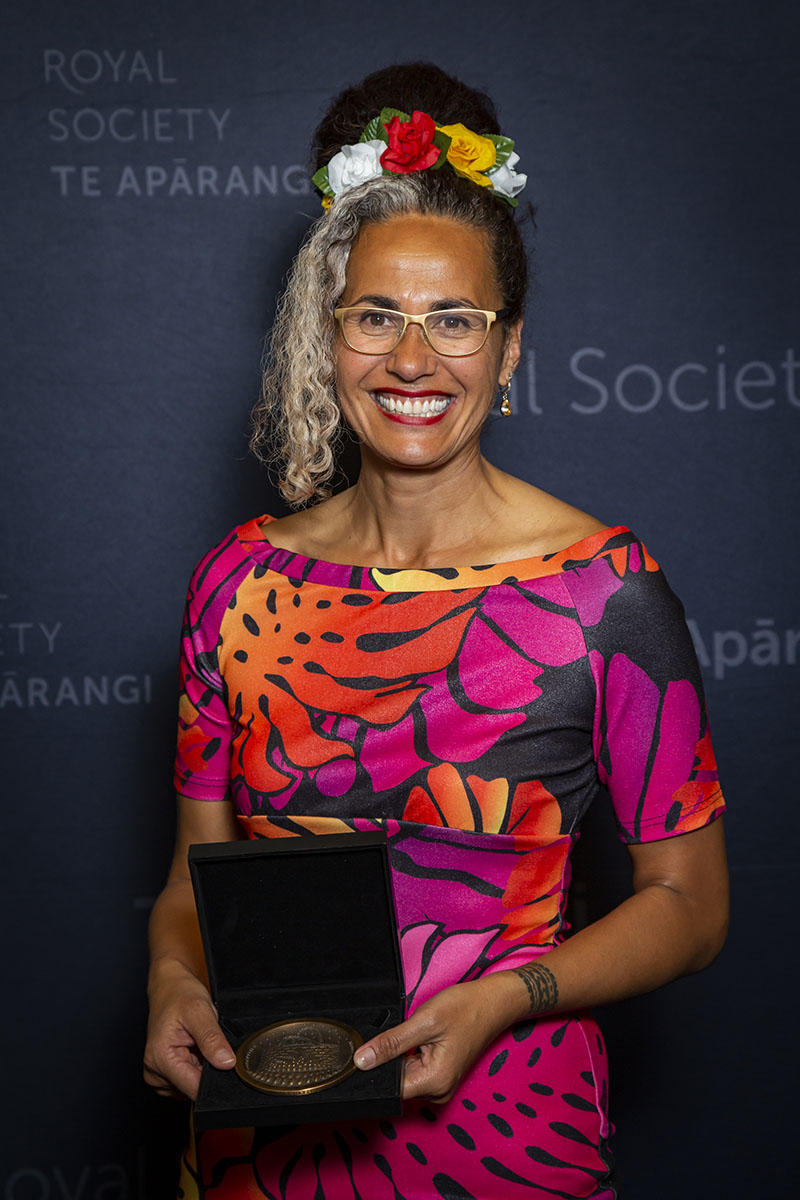
Receiving the Humanities Aronui Medal at Royal Society Te Apārangi 2019 Research Honours Aotearoa

Marsh gained her PhD from the University of Auckland in 2004 after completing her thesis titled "Ancient banyans, flying foxes and white ginger": five Pacific women writers. She is a professor in the English, Drama and Writing Studies Department at the University of Auckland where she teaches creative writing, and Pacific literature. Marsh's notable students include Robert Sullivan.

Marsh has edited the Pasifika poetry section of the New Zealand Electronic Poetry Centre.

In 2015, Marsh won the Literary Death Match for poets at the Australia and New Zealand Literary Festival in London.

In 2016, Marsh composed and performed the poem "Unity" for Queen Elizabeth II at Westminster Abbey to mark Commonwealth Day.

In August 2017, Marsh was named the New Zealand Poet Laureate for 2017–2019. Her collection, Tightrope, also made the long-list for the Ockham New Zealand Book Awards for Best Book of Poetry 2018.

In the 2019 New Year Honours, Marsh was appointed an Officer of the New Zealand Order of Merit, for services to poetry, literature and the Pacific community. In 2019, she was elected a Fellow of the Royal Society of New Zealand.

In August 2020, Marsh's book, Mophead, was the supreme winner at the New Zealand Book Awards for Children and Young Adults, and also won the Margaret Mahy Book of the Year and Elsie Locke Award for Non-fiction. In October 2020 Mophead won three awards at the Publishers Association of New Zealand Book Design Awards – the Gerard Reid Award for Best Book, Best children's book and the PANZ People’s Choice Award – recognising the design skills of Vida Kelly. Her 2020 book, Mophead Tu, was shortlisted for the Elsie Locke Award for Nonfiction at the 2021 New Zealand Book Awards for Children and Young Adults.

Poetry by Marsh was included in UPU, a curation of Pacific Island writers' work that was first presented at the Silo Theatre as part of the Auckland Arts Festival in March 2020. UPU was remounted as part of the Kia Mau Festival in Wellington in June 2021.

In August 2024, Marsh became the first Pasifika woman to be awarded the Katherine Mansfield Menton Fellowship.

In June 2025, Marsh was announced as the first Commonwealth Poet Laureate. She will serve in the role until the end of May 2027.

== Bibliography ==
- Niu Voices: Contemporary Pacific Fiction 1 (Wellington: Huia Publishers, 2006)
- Fast Talking PI (Auckland: Auckland University Press, 2009)
- Dark Sparring (Auckland: Auckland University Press, 2013)
- Tightrope (Auckland: Auckland University Press, 2017)
- Mophead: How Your Difference Makes a Difference (Auckland: Auckland University Press, 2019)
- Mophead Tu: The Queen’s Poem (Auckland: Auckland University Press, 2020)
- Wot Knot You Got? Mophead's Guide To Life (Auckland: Auckland University Press, 2024)

Cultural offices
Preceded by C. K. Stead	New Zealand Poet Laureate; 2017–2019	Succeeded by David Eggleton
New title	Commonwealth Poet Laureate; 2025–present	Incumbent
