= Mibambwe III Mutabazi II Sentabyo =

Mutabazi II Sentabyo

Mwami (King)
- Reign: 1796–1801
- Died: 1801; Rukoma Province, Kingdom of Rwanda
- Issue: Yuhi IV Gahindiro
- Dynasty: Nyiginya dynasty (3rd)
- Mother: Queen Nyiramibambwe III Nyiratamba

Mibambwe III Mutabazi II Sentabyo, (reigned 1796–1801) was a Mwami of the Kingdom of Rwanda during the eighteenth century. He succeeded Kigeli III Ndabarasa. The start of his reign was supposedly marked by two eclipses (Ubwirakabiri); the most officially coinciding with his coronation being that of 13 June 1741, and another one on 13 April 1763.

Regnal titles
Preceded by Kigeli III Ndabarasa	King of Rwanda; 1796–1801	Succeeded by Yuhi IV Gahindiro
