= Valentin Eck =

Swiss traveling humanist, Neo-Latin poet and scholar

- Born: 1494; Lindau
- Died: 1556 (aged 61–62); Bardejov, Kingdom of Hungary
- Education: University of Cracow (1511)
- Occupations: Humanist, professor

Valentin Eck (c. 1494 in Lindau – before 28 September 1556 in Bardejov) was a Swiss traveling humanist, Neo-Latin poet, and scholar. He had ties to the Cracow Academy and the early humanist circle in Cracow.

== Early life and education ==
Eck was born c. 1494 in Lindau to a burgher family. In 1508, he joined the University of Leipzig. Due to internal strife between faculty members in the humanities departments, Eck later traveled to Poland and instead attended the University of Cracow. Eck studied under Paulus Crosnensis. He received a bachelor's degree from Cracow in 1513. After graduating from Cracow, Eck remained there and taught classes at the German students’ hostel on poetry, epistolography, and versification. He was friendly with his fellow Humanist Rudolf Agricola Jr., son of the Dutch Humanist Rudolf Agricola.

== Posting in Hungary ==
In 1517, Eck moved to the Kingdom of Hungary, taking the position of the rector of the school in Bardejov (in present-day Slovakia). Outside of academia, he also worked in city administration. He held positions such as town clerk and mayor. Eck maintained his contacts in Poland. In 1520-1521, he lectured in Cracow, and perhaps also again in 1537-1539. He printed most of his works in the Polish royal city. He counted Johannes Dantiscus, Joannis Vislicensis, Justus Ludwik Decjusz, and Leonard Cox among his friends.

Eck, alongside his peers Agricola and Cox, sought to promote Humanist teachings at the university-level. They composed religious poetry, pedagogical essays, and panegyrics for their patrons. Although they had only a minimal impact on the University of Cracow, the trio did succeed in spreading humanist Latin writings to Central and Eastern Europe.

Between 1518 and his death, Alexius Thurzó (c. 1490–1543) was Eck's main patron. Thurzó was the treasurer and royal judge of the Kingdom of Hungary. In 1526, following the Battle of Mohács, Thurzó became the vice-regent for Habsburgs.

From 1542-1547, Eck was the local treasury officer and went on political missions to Vienna and Brno.

Pannoniae Luctus (1544), contributed to by Eck

== Legacy ==
Eck's most important work, De versificandi arte opusculum, was a manual for writing poetry; it was first published in 1515 and later reissued in 1521 and 1539. Eck was also the author of numerous poems and prose works, many of a laudatory nature, such as the panegyric celebrating Sigismund the Old's victory at the Battle of Orsha in 1514.

With Rudolf Agricola Jr., he edited and published texts by classical authors. Eck particularly praised the works of Virgil, Ovid, and Horace.

Eck's 1518 An prudenti uiro sit ducenda uxor was a rumination on the question of whether to take a wife, portraying both mischievous wives and the virtues of married life. It is possible he was influenced by the works of Albrecht von Eyb, an earlier Humanist who also focused on women and marriage.

Eck died in 1556 in Bardejov.

== Works ==
- Elegiacum Carmen in laudem Philippi Bervaldi, ad Rudolphum suum Agricolam... Cracoviae, 1512.
- Hymnus exhortatorius ad Cracoviam... 1514.
- Lucii Flori Bellorum Romanorum Libr. IV... 1515.
- De arte versificandi opusculum... 1515, 1521, 1539.
- Utrum prudenti Viro sit ducenda Vxor. 1518.
- Ad Clarissimos Viros, Dominum Petrum Czipser, et Andream Reuber, Bartphani populi... 1518.
- De Mundi contemptu et Virtute amplectenda Dialogus... 1519, 1528.
- Apophoreticum Carmen de Christi Natiuitate, Elegis compositum... 1520.
- De Reipublicae administratione Dialogus... 1520.
- Q. Horatii Flacci Liber de Arte Poetica ad Pisones... 1521.
- Q. Horatii Flacci Epistolarum Libri II... 1522.
- De Ratione legendi Auctores Libellus. 1525, 1534.
- Aurelii Prudentii Clementis Viri Consularis Liber Peristephanon, hymnos in laudem Sanctorum, qui Martyrio coronati sunt, complexus... 1526.
- Diui Aurelii Augustini, Hipponensis Episcopi, de Vita Christiana ad sororem suam viduam Liber I..., 1529.
- Epigrammatum Sacrorum Liber..., 1537.
- Epigrammata Pannoniae Luctui, quo Principum aliquot et insignium Virorum mortesaliique funesti Casus deplorantur... 1544.
- Elegiacon ad doctissimum Virum D. Joannem Benedictum, Cracou... Canonicum... 1545.
