= Haji Gora Haji =

Tanzanian poet (1933–2021)

Haji Gora Haji (1933 – 11 June 2021) was a Swahili-language poet, lyricist, and writer from the Zanzibar archipelago. He channeled his expansive knowledge of the culture and society of the Swahili coast, especially his homeland of Tumbatu, into his works. For his work inspired by the seascape of his home, he has been called "The Old Typhoon". He worked in a multitude of forms, from songs, stories, and epics to a full-length novel. His compositions and verse were frequently on Tanzanian radio.

== Early life ==
Haji Gora began composing works in the 1950s, before Zanzibar gained independence and unified with Tanganyika to form present-day Tanzania. Born the third child of six children on the island of Tumbatu, he saw the deaths of his twin brother and a sister in childhood. His father was Gora Haji, a respected sea captain and fisherman, and his mother was Mize Mjumbe Juma, a homemaker. His family grew to include 11 half-brothers and half-sisters. At the end of his life, he had two legal wives and 10 children from these and former marriages. When he was four, he moved from Tumbatu to live in Mkunazini, a neighborhood of Stone Town, the historic center of the capital city in Zanzibar. Since his family was too poor to afford a private primary school, he went to a Quran school instead, having learned the alphabet from a childhood friend.

His early life gave him many experiences that he used in his works. One set were the joys of life close to the sea, with games of bao and black coffee with friends next to the beach. Another was the rhythms of Ngoma ya Kibati music, which features quick, improvised dialogue set to drums with singing and dancing. Haji Gora joined Tumbatu-based drumming crews, for whom he composed hundreds of lyrics over the drumbeat.

He was trained as a fisherman by his uncles, and earned his living at various times by working as a sailor on cargo dhows, shipping cloves, and as a porter on the docks.

For most of his life, he earned his living as a fisherman (having been trained by his uncles), a dhow sailor, and as a dock porter.

== Career ==
Haji Gora recalls his initial composition was a song written in 1955 for a song and dance competition in Tumbatu. Most of his subsequent works weren't written down.

In the late 1950s, he was invited to join the Zanzibar-based Michenzani Social Club (later the Nadi Ikhwan Safaa Club), Zanzibar's oldest extant Taarab orchestra, founded in 1905. While working as a porter, he composed hundreds of Taarab lyrics for grand orchestras that played all over the island. The lyrics combined "romantic sentimentality with his keen interest in politics and philosophy", and were mostly written as three-line split verse with end-rhymes. In the 1960s, his lyrics started to appear on Zanzibari radio sung by famous Taarab singers. He also worked with the Michenzani, Culture, and Mlandege Taarab clubs, among others.

Haji Gora also attained fame in mashairi ya malumbano, a weekly verbal battle unique to the Swahili coast. In this practice, poets throw out a challenge, riddle, or provocation in verse to other poets mentioned in the composition. Those poets hear of the challenge through local newspapers or radio and, in response, come up with a comeback of their own the next week. The back-and-forth continues “until the challenge is naturally exhausted". The contest has strict requirements for the number of syllables, end sounds, and prosodic category of its verse. In the 1980s and 1990s, a wave of social criticism was expressed through this form. Haji Gora himself wrote a famous composition against domestic violence, championing women's rights.

He became famous after the publication of a collection of his poems Kimbunga: Tungo za Visiwani (The Hurricane) in 1994, under the encouragement of a few professors at the State University of Zanzibar. The title came from his song titled Kimbunga (The Hurricane), which had been performed by the Nadi Ikhwan Safaa Club and become a popular hit. They were mostly his Taarab lyrics that hadn't been written down or published before. The poems dealt with many subjects, including Zanzibar's violent revolution. The book found success and was released in four different editions in the decade after initial release. They were included for a time in the A-level school curriculum, making him very famous in Tanzania and East Africa. The collection contained a glossary from Ki-Tumbatu and Ki-Unguja vernacular to standard Swahili to help readers understand the poems outside their local context.

Haji Gora wrote five children's books in the early 2000s with support of the Children’s Book Project (Mradi wa Vitabu vya Watoto), which was funded by several international donors. He also published a Ki-Tumbatu - Swahili lexicon in 2006 and helped lexicographers create a dictionary of the Ki-Tumbatu dialect, published in 2012.

His novel Siri ya Giningi (The Secrets of Ging’ingi) came out in Kiswahili in 2009 and then in English in 2011. Recordings for Shuwari, a collection of poems meant to be performed, were done by the author and his disciple and successor Ali Haji Gora in Zanzibar in 2016; they were released in 2019. These poems were primarily in the mashairi genre and often comments, or replies to verses by other poets. One of the poems is a criticism of a poem advocating domestic violence against women.

== Poetics ==
Haji Gora's poetic language had traits prevalent in Swahili poetry of his time, like the use of rare or archaic words, and certain syntactic conventions like noun-possessive contractions (like siku yake turned to sikuye) and the deletion of the subject marker. These traits were stylized and popularized in the 1950s by Kaluta Amri Abedi in his manual of poetic composition, written in response to the exploding popularity of Swahili poetry in newspapers and radio. Other traits like the mix of Swahili and foreign words, the free intermingling of the Swahili dialects of Ki-Tumbatu (from his homeland Tumbatu) and the Ki-Unguja of Zanzibar, and the flexibility of syntactic order served to counter the rigidity of Swahili poetic forms, with their strict meter and rhyme requirements. Haji Gora's mixed use of dialects also highlighted the local dimension of his work and language. His verse often had an "obsessive rhythm" created from identical refrains, word duplication, sound repetition (alliteration and homophony).

Among the forms he worked in was the mashairi genre, popularized by Muyaka bin Haji al-Ghassaniy in the early 1800s. Haji Gora composed the majority of poems in his collection Shuwari in this form, and it remains the most popular genre of Swahili poetry in general. The genre incorporates "many features of oral poetry, namely the use of colloquial and idiomatic language and the creation of euphony through various stylistic means such as lexical repetition, sound repetition, alliteration and rhyme". A mashairi commonly comprises two four-line stanzas, with each line being two eight-syllable hemistiches that rhyme at the middle and the end. There are several variants for rules for the last line. Haji Gora didn't see the form as an artificial restriction. He felt that to be a poet was to take upon the responsibility for creating verse that satisfied rhyme and meter requirements.

Language was a fundamental subject in Haji Gora's poems. He wrote about being careful with one's words, language "as a vector of cultural identity", and preserving one's language and dialect. He used Swahili sayings and proverbs in complex ways, often developing their ideas in his compositions with additional metaphors and sensorial language.

== Death and legacy ==
In his early 80s in 2015, he was hit by a car and relocated to the countryside to heal with his family's help. With his removal from the city that fed his creativity, his mental state started to deteriorate and he wasn't allowed to write by his family, who asked him to rest instead. He talked to invisible people and creatures, but would occasionally have moments of lucidity. His last years were also spent in poverty, with infrequent royalties that didn't meet his or his family's needs. Near the end of his life, his sons tried to ensure his legacy, with dreams to open a foundation and poetry community center. He died 11 June 2021.

Translations of his works have also appeared in German. He also took part in international events like the Poetry International Festival Rotterdam (1999), where he represented Swahili poetry.

In 2001, during the celebration of Kiswahili Day in Dar es Salaam, he was honored by BAKITA (Baraza la Kiswahili la Taifa), the National Swahili Council, for his literary work and contributions to the growth of Kiswahili as a literary language. He had been a member of the organization between 1980 and 1982 and had received several other awards from it. He was also a member of BAKIZA (Baraza la Kiswahili Zanzibar), the Zanzibar Swahili Council, between 2001 and 2003.

He also received the ZIFF Lifetime Achievement Laureate. Zanzibari journalist Ally Saleh wrote a biography of Haji Gora, Maisha ya Haji Gora (The Life of Haji Gora), which was published in 2016.

== Bibliography ==
- Kimbunga: Tungo za Visiwani (Collection of poetry in Swahili, OCLC 225588833, 1994)
- Utenzi wa visa vya Nabii Suleiman bi Daudi ("The Epic of Prophet Suleiman, Son of Daud", an epic poem about Solomon in Swahili, LCCN 2001-313459, 1999)
- Poems (A collection of poetry translated to German, OCLC 658079178, 1999)
- Maisha Yangu, 1993 - 2001 ("My Life, 1993 - 2001", an unpublished autobiography)
- Kunganyira (a children's book in Swahili, ISBN 978-9987-411-11-5, 2004)
- Nahodha Chu ("Captain Leopard", a children's book in Swahili, 2004)
- Ujanja wa sungura ("The Cunning of the Hare", a children's book in Swahili, ISBN 978-9976-4-0083-0, 2004)
- Jogoo na Kanga ("The Cock and the Guinea Fowl", a children's book in Swahili, ISBN 978-9966-010-86-5, 2004)
- Kamusi ya kitumbatu (A Ki-Tumbatu - Swahili lexicon, ISBN 978-9987-9024-4-6, 2006)
- Siri ya Ging'ingi ("The Secrets of Ging’ingi", a novel in Swahili, ISBN 978-9987-531-13-4, 2009; English translation, LCCN 2011-349890, 2011)
- Shuwari ("The Calm", Swahili with English translations, ISBN 979-10-92789-19-5, 2019)
