= Gozel Shagulyeva =

Turkmen poet (born 1940)

Gozel Shagulyeva (also Amangözel Şagulyýewa, Turkmen: Гозель Шагулыева; born 11 August 1940) is a Turkmen poet. She began writing poetry at a young age, and has since become a prominent cultural figure in Turkmenistan. She writes about her affection and adoration of Turkmen politicians, including former presidents Gurbanguly Berdimuhamedow and Saparmurat Niyazov; she was awarded the title of Hero of Turkmenistan by Berdimuhamedow for her literary contributions to the culture of the country in 2015. Her writing has been criticised for being too flattering.

== Early life ==
Gozel Shagulyeva was born on 11 August 1940 in the Mary Region of Turkmenistan. She was the eldest of six children. Her father told her folk stories in her youth, and she began writing poetry at the age of 11 for a school newspaper.

== Career ==
Shagulyeva poetry is well-known to the Turkmen public for its persistent displays of admiration and affection for president Gurbanguly Berdimuhamedow—often referring to him with the title Arkadag (protector)—such as in her declarations "I will live, dedicated to you" and "You are as great as the Universe, Arkadag!". Similarly, her earlier work admired Saparmurat Niyazov, the first president of Turkmenistan; she wrote about him that if he were to die, so would she, and that she would have "no life without" him. In 2015, she was named a Hero of Turkmenistan by Berdimuhamedow for her contributions to the nation's cultural environment. The event, in which she was also awarded the Altyn Aý (Golden Moon) medal, coincided with the release of her book of poems Göwün otyr aý içinde.

After the restoration of a structure at the Seyit Jemalletdin Mosque in 2016, Shagulyeva met with a United States delegation (including Allan Mustard, the ambassador to Turkmenistan) to signal the strength of Turkmenistan–United States relations. The restoration was United States-funded, and a press release by the United States embassy described Shagulyeva as "a famous Turkmen poet".

Her writing about Berdimuhamedow earned her criticism from Eurasianet in 2018, where she was described as "sycophantic and craven" for her poem "The Messenger of Heaven Descended to Earth", written to celebrate Berdimuhamedow's birthday and published on the front page of Neytralny Turkmenistan, the state newspaper of Turkmenistan. They said historians will remember her for being an undying "court flatterer" with a "voluminous toadeating poetic oeuvre".
