= Gulielmus Peregrinus =

Gulielmus Peregrinus (fl. c. 1190 – 1207), also known as Gulielmus de Canno or William the Pilgrim, was an English epic poet and versificator regis ("king's poet") to Kings Richard I and John.
