= List of heads of state of the Maldives =

This is a list of heads of state of the Maldives.

== Solar and Lunar dynasties ==
=== Solar dynasty (Aadheettha Vansa) ===
At first, Maldives was a matriarchal society with each atoll ruled by a chief queen according to some accounts or by others, several theocratic societies ruled by priests known as Sawamias of heliolatric, selenolatric and astrolatric religions. After that, the first kingdom was established, named Dheeva Maari.

Name	Monarch from	Monarch until	Notes
Sri Soodasarunaditya	573 BCE	530 BCE	King Sri Soorudasaruna Aditya is remembered in Maldivian tradition as the founder of the ancient monarchy, reigning from 573 to 530 BCE. He is said to have been the son of a Kalingan (eastern Indian) royal father and a royal mother from Sarunadipa (Sumatra).
Unknown number of rulers			The Mapanansa, the copper plates on which the history of the Kings of Solar Dynasty was written were lost quite early on. A 4th century notice written by Ammianus Marcellinus (362 CE) speaks of gifts sent to the Roman emperor Julian by a deputation from the nation of "Divi". The name "Divi" is very similar to "Dheyvi" who were the first settlers of Maldives.
Srimati Damahara	953	990	She is also spelled as Damahaar. Last ruler of the Solar Dynasty. It is unclear from the records how many other rulers ruled between the reigns of King Sri Srudasarunaditya and Queen Damahara. Married Prince Sri Mahabaladitya from the Kalinga kingdom who later became the first king of the Lunar Dynasty. Al-Jawaliqi, writing in 1135 CE looking at earlier records, describes a queen of Maldives named "Danhara" ruling on an island called "Abannba".

=== Lunar dynasty (Soma Vansa) ===
Although the first kings of Maldives were of Solar dynasty, the last queen of the solar dynasty, Queen Srimati Damahara married a prince from Lunar dynasty (Soma Vansa) who came from Kalinga thus establishing the line of Soma Vansa.

Name	Monarch from	Monarch until	Notes
Sri Mahabaladitya	around 990	unknown	Prince from Kalinga kingdom of India. Married Queen Damahara of the Solar dynasty to become the ruler of Dheeva Maari. Early during his reign King Rajaraja I of Chola captured the northern atolls Minicoy and Thiladhummathi. Although some sources indicate the start of the reign as when Rajaraja I invaded Maldives, a Chinese document from the Tang dynasty, records the visits of people from Mo-lai (Maldives) to China bringing with them gifts from their king, Che-p'o-lo-ti-to (Sri Mahabalāditya) in 658 CE and also in 662 CE. The king mentioned must have been a king of the Solar dynasty.
Sri Laukabarana	11th cent.	11th cent.	King of the Lunar dynasty. He is son or grandson of Queen Damahara. His name is alternatively written as Sri Loaka Abaaruna.
Sri Maha Sandura	~11th cent.	unknown	Son of King Laukabarana. He had a daughter Princess Kamanhaar (also known as Kamanaar or Rehendihaar), who was banished to the island then called Is-Midu (Addu Meedhoo today). With her she took the Mapanansa, the copper plates in which the history of the kings of Solar dynasty was written. The Mapanansa were later buried by a certain Al-Muhaddith Hassan, and this is why such little information survived about the Solar dynasty.
Sri Bovana Ananda	unknown	before 1117	Son of King Laukabarana and brother of King Maha Sandura. He is the father of King Koimala.

== Theemuge dynasty ==
=== Sultan ===
View Family Tree of Queen Damahaar Maha Rehendi
- Queen Damahaar Maha Rehendi (Last Queen of Solar dynasty)
  - Svasti Sri Loka Abaruna, King Loka Abaruna
    - King Maha Sandura
      - Princess Kamanhaar
    - Svasti Sri Buwana Ananda, King Buwana ananda
      - Svasti Sri Somavamsa Adipati Sri Theemuge Sri Maha Parama Aditya, King Koimala.
      - Princess Henevi Ma'ava'a Kilage.
        - Prince Dhovemi Kalaminja, Sultan Dhovemi, Dharumavantha Rasgefaanu
        - Prince Sri Kalo
        - Princess Mulee Mava'a Kilege
          - Prince Muthey Kalaminja, Sultan Muthey
          - Princess Reki Hiriya Mava'a Kilage
            - Prince Ali Kalaminja, Sultan Ali I
            - Princess Fahi Hiriya Mava'a Kilage
              - Prince Dinei Kalaminja, Sultan Dhinei
              - Prince Dihai Kalaminja, Sultan Dhihei
              - Prince Valla Dio Kalaminja, Sultan Valla Dio
              - Princess Aidigu Mava'a Kilage
              - Prince Wadi Kalaminja, Sultan Wadi
                - Prince Hali Kalaminja, Sultan Hali I
                - Prince Keimi Kalaminja, Sultan Keimi
                - Prince Audha, Sultan Audha
                  - Prince Hali, Sultan Hali II
                  - Prince Yoosuf, Sultan Yoosuf I
                    - Prince Davud, Sultan Davud
                    - Prince Salis, Sultan Salis
                      - Prince Omar, Sultan Omar I
                        - Prince Ahmed Shihabuddine, Sultan Ahmed Shihabuddine
                        - Princess Khadijah, Sultana Rehendi Khadijah
                        - Princess Raadhafathi, Sultana Raadhafathi
                          - Princess Dhaain, Sultana Dhaain

Name	Regnal Name	Duration of Reign	Monarch from	Monarch until	Notes
King Mahaabarana Adeettiya (Koimala)	Suvasthi Shri Theemuge Rannafireyru Mini Mahaabarana Mahaaradhun	21 years	1121	1141	The first king of the Royal House of Theemugey.
King Dhovemi Later Sultan Muhammad al-Adil	Siri Bavanditta Maha Radun	35 years	1141	1176	Reigned as a Buddhist until 1153. Son of Henevi Maava Kilege, sister of Koimala. A member of the Soma or Homa (Lunar) dynasty. Converted to Islam in 1153, assumed the title Sultan and founded the Theemuge dynasty. He was the famous Dharumavantha Radun or the Benevolent King.
Sultan Muthey	Bavana Abaruna Maha Radun	8 years	1176	1184	Mother's sister's son of Dhovemi
Sultan Ali b. Reke Hiriya	Dammara-nanda Maha Radun	8 years	1184	1192	
Sultan Dinei	Fanaditta Maha Radun	6 years	1192	1198	The Lōmāfānu was written during Sultan Dhinei's reign.
Sultan Dihei	Dagata Abaruna Maha Radun	15 years	1198	1213	Brother of Sultan Dhinei I
Sultan Wadi	Dagata Suvara Maha Radun	19 years	1213	1232	Brother of Sultans Dhinei I and Dhinei II
Sultan Valla Dio	Rada-rada Suvara Maha Radun	25 years	1232	1257	Brother of Sultans Dhinei I, Dhinei II and Wadi
Sultan Hudei	Vira Abaruna Maha Radun	6 years	1257	1263	
Sultan Aima	Loka Suvara Maha Radun	2 years	1263	1265	
Sultan Hiley (Ali)	Sinja Abaruna Maha Radun	2 years	1265	1267	
Sultan Kalaminja b. Aydage	Madini Survara Maha Radun	1 year	1267	1268	
Sultan Uda (Auda)	Arida Suvara Maha Radun	9 years	1268	1277	Son of Sultan Wadi
Sultan Ali II	Arida Suvara Maha Radun	10 years	1277	1287	Son of Sultan Audha
Sultan Yoosuf	Bavana Aditta Maha Radun	6 years	1287	1293	Brother of Sultan Hali II
Sultan Salah al-Din b. Yusuf	Some Sivara Maha Radun	8 years	1293	1301	Son of Sultan Yoosuf I
Sultan Da'ud b. Yusuf	Sundura Bavana Maha Radun	5 years	1301	1306	Son of Sultan Yoosuf I
Sultan Umar Vira (Abu Fath Jalal al-Din)	Loka Abaruna Maha Radun	34 years	1306	1340	Son of Sultan Salis
Sultan Shihab al-Din Ahmad	Loka Aditta Maha Radun	7 years	1340	1347 Deposed and assassinated	Son of Sultan Omar I, deposed, banished and assassinated by sister Khadijah.
Sultana Rehindi Kabadi Kilege (Khadija)	Rada Abaruna Maha Radun	15 years	1347	1362 Deposed	Deposed by her first husband Mohamed el-Jameel.
Sultan Mohamed el-Jamil	Bavana Suja Maha Radun	1 year	1362	1363 Deposed and assassinated	First Husband of Sultana Khadijah. Assassinated by estranged wife Khadijah. He was nicknamed Handsome Mohamed.
Sultana Rehendi (Khadijah)	Rada Abaruna Maha Radun	10 years	1363	1373 Deposed	Second reign on assassination of first husband Sultan Mohamed el-Jameel. Deposed for a second time by her second husband Abdullah.
Sultan Abdullah Kilege	Dammaru Aaditta Maha Radun	3 years	1373	1376 Deposed and assassinated	Second husband of Sultana Khadijah. Assassinated by wife Khadijah.
Sultana Rehendi (Khadijah)	Rada Abaruna Maha Radun	3 years	1376	1379	Third reign
Sultana Radafati (Adafate) Kabadi Kilege	Soma Aburana Maha Radun	1 year	1379	1380 Deposed	Daughter of Sultan Omar I, half sister of Sultana Khadijah. Deposed by husband Mohamed.
Sultan Mohamed I	Sundura Abaruna Maha Radun	4 years	1380	1384	Husband of Sultana Raadhafathi. Son of Kaeumani Kaulhanna Kilege. He is from the island of Maakurathu in Raa Atoll hence he is also known as Maakurathu Mohamed Rasgefaan.
Sultana Da'inu Kabadi Kilege	Natta Abaruna Maha Radun	3 years	1385	1388 Deposed	Daughter of Sultan Mohamed I. Deposed by husband Abdullah.
Sultan Abdullah	Soma Abaruna Maha Radun	less than 1 year	1388	1388	Husband of Sultana Dhaain. Some records call him a regent (Henevi-rasge).
Sultan Uthman al-Fahandavi	Sundura Aditta Maha Radun	less than 1 year	1388	1388	Sultan Usman I Former Imam to Raadhafathi and Dhaain Last of the Lunar dynasty. Grave found in Thaa Atoll, Guraidhoo by H.C.P Bells expedition.

== Hilaalee dynasty ==
=== Sultan ===
View Family Tree of Abbas al-Hilal
- Abbas al-Hilal
  - Hassan Kuja Malim Kologe
    - Yusuf Handegiri Khadim Ma'abanderi
      - Sultan Danna Muhammadh
        - Princess Tukkabafaanu
  - Kulhiveru Hilalu Kaivulanna Kaloge + Golavehi Kabulo
    - Hassan I, Sultan Hassan al-Hilali Sri Dhiru Buwana Maha Radhun
      - Prince Ibrahim al-Hilali Kalaminja, Sultan Ibrahim I al-Hilali
      - Prince Usman Ras Kilege, Sultan Usman II ibnu
      - Prince Abu Bakar Kalaminja, Sultan Abu Bakar I
        - Princess Rekka
          - Dorimena Kilegefaanu
          - Al-Amir Dombula Ali Farina Kilege, Sultan Ali V
          - Buraki Rani (Queen regent or Rani ruled with Sultan Kalu Muhammedh)
          - Reki
        - Princess Kaba Dio
          - Shaikh Hassan, Sultan Hassan VI
    - Hussain I, Sultan Husain al-Hilali, Sultan of the Maldives (Twins with brother Hassan)
      - Ma'afai Kalo Kilege
      - Kaulanna'a Kalo Kilege
      - Ali Heneve Ras Kilege, Sultan Ali IV
      - Prince Yusuf Kalaminja, Sultan Yusuf II
        - Sultan Haji Nasir ul-Mukhatib Hassan III
        - Prince Umaru Kalaminja, Sultan Umar II
          - Sultan Yusuf III
            - Sultan Hassan VII
          - Prince Hassan Kalaminnja, Sultan Hassan V
            - Prince Ibrahim Kalaminja Ras Kilege, Sultan Ibrahim II
          - Prince Yusufu Kalaminja Ras Kilege, Sultan Yusuf III
            - Sultan Hassan VII
          - Prince Kalu Muhammad Kalaminja, Sultan Kalu Muhammad
            - Prince Hassan Dobula Fa'aruna'a, Sultan Hassan VIII
            - Prince Umar Ma'afai Kilege, Sultan Hilali Muhammad
              - Sultan Muhammad
              - Prince Hemanin Kalaminja
            - Prince Ahmad Manikufa'anu Kalaminja
              - Sultan Hilali Hassan IX (Later Dom Manoel)
                - Dom Francisco de Malvidas
                - Dom João de Malvidas, King Dom Felipe
                  - Dom Felipe de Malvidas, King Dom Felipe
                  - Infanta Dona Inez de Malvidas
                    - Dom Luís de Souza, King Dom Luís
                      - Manuel de Sousa da Silva
                    - Dom Manoel Malavis
                - Dom Pedro de Malvidas
                - Dona Leonor de Malvidas
                - Dona Catarina de Malvidas
            - Princess Aisha Kabafaanu Rani Kilege + Sultan Ali IV
              - Kuda Kalafaanu
              - Sitti Maryam Ma'ava'a Kuda Kamanafa'anu Rani Kilege (d/o Aisha Kabafa'anu). m. at Malé, 1573, Al-Amir Hassan Rannabanderi Kilegefa'anu, younger son of Kalege Husain Thakuru'fa'anu, Khatib of Uthimu Island, Tiladummati Atoll
                - Kalege Kalu Hassan, of Bararu, Tiladummati Atoll (Start of The Uthimu Dynasty)
                  - Kalege Kalu 'Ali Thakurufa'anu, Khatib of Uthimu Island, Tiladummati Atoll
                    - Kalege Husain Thakuru'fa'anu, Khatib of Uthimu + Amina Dio
                      - Kalege 'Ali Thakurufa'anu
                        - Amira Maryam Kamba'adi Kilege
                          - Amira Amina Ma'ava Kilege + Al-Amir 'Umar Ma'afai Kilege
                            - Kalu Thukkala, Sultan Shuja'at Muhammad Imad ud-din I, Bodu Rasgefaanu
                              - Sultan Ibrahim Iskandar I
                                - Prince Kuda Muhammad, who succeeded as Sultan Muhammad I
                                - Maryam + the son of Thakandhu 'Ali Bandeyri Thakurufa'anu.
                                - Princess Rendi Kaba'afa'anu
                              - A son, unknown name
                                - Amira Amina Kamba'adi Kilege + Al-Amir Mahmud Fandiyaru Kilegefa'anu (d. 8 March 1678), Chief Judge 1663-1678, son of Don Boi Naib Thakurufa'anu, the step-son of Addu Bodu Fandiyaru Thakurufa'anu.
                                  - Funadhu Muhammad Siraj ud-din Thakurufa'anu, Khatib.
                              - Princess "Fulana" + Al-Amir Hassan Farina Kilege Dorimena, younger son of Al-Amir Husain Fa'amuladeri Kilegefa'anu
                              - Princess Mariyam Kaba'adi Kilege
                      - Kalege Muhammed Bodu Thakurufa'anu Khatib, who succeeded as Sultan Ghazi Muhammed Thakurufa'anu al-'Azam
                      - Al-Amir Hassan Thakurufa'anu Khatib + Princess Aisha Kabafa'anu, daughter of Sultan Kalu Muhammad
                        - Kuda Kalafa'anu
                        - Al-Amira Kuda Kalu Kamanafa'anu
                  - Eduru Thakurufa'anu, Khatib of Bararu, Tiladummati Atoll
                    - Al-Amir 'Umar Oligina Kilege, of Maduvari Island
                      - Al-Amir Husain Fa'amuladeri Kilegefa'anu
                        - Al-Amir Muhammd Dorimena Kilegefa'anu
                        - Al-Amir Hassan Farina Kilege Dorimena
                          - Muhammad Manikufa'anu, Sultan Muhammad Muhi ud-din

Name	Regnal Name	Monarch from	Monarch until	Notes
Sultan Hassan I	Bavana	1388	1398	First of the Hilaaly dynasty. Son of Golhaavahi Kambulo (Kalavahi Kabulo) and Kulhiveri Hilaalu Kaeulhanna Kaloge son of Muslim Abbas of Hulhule.
Sultan Ibrahim I	Dhammaru Veeru	1398	1398	Son of Sultan Hassan I. Deposed by his uncle Hussain.
Sultan Hussain I	Loka Veeru	1398	1409	Brother of Sultan Hassan I. Assumed the throne after deposing his nephew Sultan Ibrahim I.
Sultan Nasiruddine	Veeru Abaarana	1409	1411	Introduced the Islamic penal code. Possibly a member of the Lunar dynasty
Sultan Hassan II	Keerithi Maha Radun (no coronation)	1411	1411	Drowned in a tank.
Sultan Isa	Bavana Sundhura	1411	1411	Brother of Sultan Hassan II.
Sultan Ibrahim I	Dhammaru Veeru	1411	1421	Second reign, first reigned in 1398.
Sultan Osman II	Dhammaru Loaka	1421	1421	Son of Sultan Osman I.
Sultan Danna Mohamed	Raadha Bavana	1421	1421	Uncle of Sultan's Hassan I and Hussain I. Prime Minister to Osman I
Sultan Yoosuf II	Loka Aananadha	1421	1443	Son of Sultan Hassan I
Sultan Aboobakuru I	Bavana Sooja	1443	1443	Son of Sultan Hassan I half brother of Sultan Yoosuf II. Killed in battle with the Portuguese who came to summon the Council of Ministers of the Maldives to Cochin.
Sultan Hasan III	Raadha Veeru	1443	1467	Son of Sultan Aboobakuru I. Deposed by Sayyid Mohamed while abroad.
Sultan Sayyid Mohamed	Keerithi Maha Radun (no coronation)	1467	1467	Deposed by Sultan Hassan III upon returning to Maldives.
Sultan Hasan III	Raadha Veeru	1467	1468	Second reign.
Sultan Mohamed II	Bavana Abaarana	1468	1480	Son of Sultan Hasan III.
Sultan Hassan IV	Raadha Loka	1480	1480	Son of Sultan Mohamed II. Deposed by Omar II.
Sultan Omar II	Loka Sundhura	1480	1484	Son of Sultan Yoosuf II.
Sultan Hassan V	Raadha Aanandha	1484	1485	Son of Sultan Omar II.
Sultan Hassan IV	Raadha Loka	1485	1491	Second reign.
Sultan Hassan VI	Raadha Fanaveeru	1491	1492	Grandson of Sultan Aboobakuru I.
Sultan Ibrahim II	Bavana Furasuddha	1492	1492	Son of Omar II.
Sultan Kalu Mohamed	Dhammaru Bavana	1492	1492	Son of Sultan Omar II. Deposed by his brother Yoosuf.
Sultan Yoosuf III	Veeru Aanandha	1492	1493	Son of Sultan Omar II.
Sultan Ali II	Audha Veeru	1493	1495	Grandson of Sultan Hassan I.
Sultan Kalu Mohamed	Dhammaru Bavana	1495	1510	Second reign. Son of Sultan Omar II Deposed for a second time, this time by his nephew Hassan.
Sultan Hassan VII	Singa Veeeru	1510	1511	Son of Sultan Yoosuf III.
Sultan Sharif Ahmed	Suddha Bavana	1511	1513	An Arab from Mecca. Possible descendant of Muhammad.
Sultan Ali III	Aanandha	1513	1513	Killed in a duel with his sister Burecca (Buraki Raani). Grandson of Sultan Aboobakuru I. Son of Mohamed Farhana Kalo and Recca daughter of Aboobakuru I
Sultan Kalu Mohamed	Dhammaru Bavana	1513	1529	Third accession assisted by his wife Queen Burecca who killed her brother Ali III
Sultan Hassan VIII	Ran Mani Loka	1529	1549	Son of Sultan Kalu Mohamed and Fatuma Dio, a concubine from Shiraz in Persia.
Sultan Mohamed III	Singa Bavana	1549	1551	Assassinated by his brother Hassan succeeded him. Son of Golhavahi Aysha Rani Kilege and Omar Maafaiy Kilege son of Kalu Mohamed and Aysha Rani Kilege daughter of Korari Kilege. Therefore, Grandson of Sultan Kalu Mohamed.
Sultan Hassan IX	Dhirukusa Loka	1551	1552	Brother of Mohamed III. He was the first Maldivian and only member of its royalty to renounce Islam and convert to Christianity. He was deposed upon conversion, and known subsequently by the Lusitanian name of Dom Manoel.
Interregnum		1552	1554	Maldives ruled by a Council of Ministers.
Sultan Aboobakuru II	Asaalees Loka	1554	1557	Son of Ibrahim Faarhana Kilege and Sanfa Dio. Former Prime Minister to Dom Manoel.
Sultan Ali IV	Audha Siyaaka Katthiri	1557	1558	Killed in battle. Son of Prime Minister Abdur Rahman Dorhimeyna Kaloge and Sitti Rani Kilege. He was married to Princess Aysha Rani Kilege, aunt of Dom Manoel and daughter of Kalu Mohamed.
King Dom Manoel	Dhirikusa Loka (in absentia)	1558	1573	Restored as the king. Formerly known as Sultan Hassan IX. A Maldivian Catholic named Andiri Andirin acted as his regent, while Manoel lived in Goa.
Interregnum		1573	1573	Maldives ruled by Kateeb Mohamed Thakurufan of Utheemu after he assassinated Andiri Andirin, the regent of King Dom Manoel. As per a treaty he got refuge from Ali Raja of Cannanore, Mohamed Thakurufan's base of operation was Minicoy under the sovereignty of Cannanore. Keteeb Mohamed Thakurufan did not honour this promise. The Ali Raja demanded dominion over the Maldives, as promised to him by the Kateeb of Uteem. The nature of the relationship between Kateeb Mohamed Thakurufan and the Ali Raja of Cannanore was outlined in a letter sent by a later Ali Raja, Mariambe Ali-Adi Raja Bibi, to the Sultan Mohamed Mueenuddine I of the Maldives. The letter was dated Friday 17 Jamada-el-oula Anno Hegirae 1243 (7 December AD 1827). According to the letter Mohamed Thakurufan had entered into a treaty ceding sovereignty of the Maldives to the Ali Raja of Cannanore in the event Thakurufan was established in power in Male. (refer page 294 of Divehi Tarikh).
King Dom Manoel	Dhirikusa Loka	1573	1583	Kateeb Mohamed Thakurufan concluded a Treaty with King Dom Manoel in order to ward off the Ali Raja of Cannanore with whose help the Kateeb seized power in Male. Under the treaty, Dom Manoel was restored but remained in Goa. The co-regents were Kateeb Mohamed Thakurufan of Utheem and his brother Hassan Thakurufan. The kateeb conferred on himself the title of sultan in 1583 upon Dom Manoel's death. This was in breach of the Treaty and was not legally binding.
King Dom João	Keerithi Maha Radun (no coronation)	1583	1603	Son of King Manoel, who remained in Goa. He had two brothers, Dom Francisco and Dom Pedro. Kateeb Mohamed Thakurufan and his brother Hassan Thakurufan ruled for King Dom João as co-regents. Kateeb Mohamed Thakurufan assumed the title of Sultan following the death of King Dom Manoel. He married a Portuguese Christian noblewoman, Donna Francisca Vasconelles and had two children, Dom Philippe and Dona Inez. Ibrahim, also known as Kalaafaan (literally "Lord") was the de facto sultan, but legally the regent of Kings Dom João and Dom Philippe who resided in Goa. He reigned from 1585 to 1609. Son of Mohamed Thakurufan, kateeb of Utheemu and Rehendiye Goyye daughter of Cat Fatima of Boarhi Woods in Baarah. Ibrahim Kalaafaan was the regent at the time of François Pyrard de Laval's detainment in the Maldives after the shipwreck.
King Dom Philippe	Keerithi Maha Radun (no coronation)	1603	1632	Son of King Dom João and Donna Francisca Vasconelles. Al-Amira Kuda Kalu Kamanafaanu acted as regent from 1607 until 1609. She was the daughter of Hassan Thakurufaan and Sitti Maryam Maavaa Kuda Kamanafaanu Rani Kilege, daughter of Sultan Ali VI, Sultan of the Maldives, by his wife, Princess Aisha Kabafa'anu, daughter of Sultan Kalu Mohamed Hussain Faamuladeyri Kilege acted as regent from 1609 to 1620. Muhammad Imaduddin I acted as regent from 1620 to 1632. De-recognised in the Maldives after an abortive expedition with Portuguese assistance in order to abolish regency and assume power.

== Utheemu dynasty ==
=== Sultan ===
Name	Regnal Name	Monarch from	Monarch until	Notes
Sultan Muhammad Imaduddin I	Kula Sundhura Katthiri Bavana	1632	1648	Legally proclaimed sultan in 1632 former regent for King Dom Philippe.
Sultan Ibrahim Iskandar I	Kula Ran Meeba Katthiri Bavana	1648	1687	Son of Sultan Muhammad Imaduddin I.
Sultan Kuda Muhammad	Maniranna Loka	1687	1691	Son of Sultan Ibrahim Iskandar I. His mother Princess Maryam acted as regent due to his age. Killed with his mother while at sea in an explosion.
Sultan Muhammad Mohyeddine	Naakiree Sundhura	1691	1692	Re-established the Islamic penal code. Son of Dharanboodhoo Kadida Dio and Abu Naibu Hassan Dorhimeyna Kilege son of the Regent Hussain Famuladeyri Kilege.

== Hamavi dynasty ==
=== Sultan ===
Name	Regnal Name	Monarch from	Monarch until.	Notes
Sultan Muhammad Shamsuddeen I	Mikaalha Madhaadheettha	1692	1692	Arab mentor of Sultan Muhammad Mohyeddine. He first visited Male during the reign of Ibrahim Iskandar I. He was Probably poisoned to death. He coutured the re-establishment of the Islamic Penal code held by the previous Sultan Muhammad Mohyeddine and assigned Scholars to teach in Mosques. In his Sultanate Maldives was very peaceful and citizens became educated and religious. (refer page 67 to 69 of Divehi Tarikh)

== Dhevvadhoo dynasty ==
=== Sultan ===
Name	Regnal Name	Monarch from	Monarch until	Notes
Sultan Mohamed IV	Kula Ran Mani	1692	1701	First Sultan of the Dhevvadhoo dynasty. Popularly known as Dhevvadhoo Rasgefaanu, son of Ali Mafahaiy Kilege of Dhevvadhoo and Kakuni Dio. Sultan Mohamed IV was married to Khadheeja Kanba, daughter of Ibrahim Shah Bandar of Isdhoo (Isdhoo Bodu Velaanaa Thakurufaan)

== Isdhoo dynasty ==
=== Sultan ===
Name	Regnal Name	Monarch from	Monarch until	Notes
Sultan Ali V	Kula Ran Muiy	1701	1701	First Sultan of the Isdhoo dynasty. Son of Ibrahim Shah Bandar Kilege of Isdhoo and Aysha Dio.
Sultan Hasan X	Keerithi Maha Radun (no coronation)	1701	1701	Son of Sultan Ali V. Deposed by his cousin Ibrahim Mudzhiruddine. He is not listed in Radhavalhi, the official chronicle.
Sultan Ibrahim Mudzhiruddine	Muthey Ran Mani Loka	1701	1704	Cousin of Sultan Hasan X. Deposed by his Prime Minister Muhammad Imaduddin during the regency of his spouse, Fatima Kabafa'anu, while on the Hajj pilgrimage.

== Dhiyamigili dynasty ==
=== Sultan ===
Name	Regnal Name	Monarch from	Monarch until	Notes
Sultan Muhammad Imaduddin II	Kula Sundhura Siyaaka Saasthura	1704	1720	Prime Minister to Sultan Ibrahim Mudzhiruddine. First of the Dhiyamigili dynasty. Son of Ibrahim Dorhimeyna Kaloge and Amina Dio.
Sultan Ibrahim Iskandar II	Rannava Loka	1720	1750	Son of Sultan Muhammad Imaduddin II and Amina Dio of Fenfushi.
Sultan Muhammad Imaduddin III	Navaranna Keerithi	1750	1757	Son of Sultan Muhammad Imaduddin II and Amina Dio of Fenfushi. Held captive on Kavaratti island from 1752 until his death in 1757. In 1752 he was seized by the Ali Raja of Cannanore and transported to Kavaratti island in the Laccadives. Male was occupied. The occupation was ended by Muleegey Dom Hassan Maniku, a direct descendant of the penultimate Christian King Joao. The sultan died in captivity. During this time Maldives was ruled by the captive sultan's niece Amina I of Maldives and his daughter, Amina II. The de facto regent was Muleegey Dom Hassan Maniku.
Interregnum		1757	1759	Regency continued in expectation of the return of the deceased sultan's heir from captivity.
Sultana Amina I		1753	1754	Daughter of Sultan Ibrahim Iskandar II. Amina assumed the role of the ruler (regent) of Maldives in 1753 after Male was recaptured from the Malabars after 17 weeks of occupation. She was the daughter of Sultan Ibrahim Iskandar II and Aisha Manikfan. She abdicated the throne and moved to Addu Atoll in the south. She was later banished to various islands and eventually became the Ruler of Maldives for the second time as the regent during the reign of her younger brother Sultan Mohamed Ghiyasuddin in 1773.
Sultana Amina II		1757	1759	Daughter of Sultan Muhammad Imaduddin III. Amina succeeded her cousin in 1754 as nominal regent for her absent father the age of nine, while Muleegey Hassan Manikfaan managed the political affairs as de facto regent. Her father died in 1757 in Minicoy, after which she formally became monarch and queen regnant. In 1759 Sultan Hassan Izzuddin became monarch because the citizens did not approve of a young female as their head.

== Huraa dynasty ==
=== Sultan ===
Name	Regnal Name	Monarch from	Monarch until	Notes
Sultan Hasan 'Izz ud-din	Kula Ran Meeba Audha Keerithi Katthiri Bavana	1759	1766	Muleegey Dom Hassan Maniku or Don Bandaara was the first Sultan of the Huraa Dynasty. Son of Amina Dio daughter of Mohamed Kateeb of Muli and Huraa Mohamed Faamuladeyri Thakurufan.

== Dhiyamigili dynasty (restored) ==
=== Sultan ===
Name	Regnal Name	Monarch from	Monarch until	Notes
Sultan Muhammed Ghiya'as ud-din	Kula Ranmani Keerithi	1766	1774	Son of Sultan Ibrahim Iskandar II. Deposed while on the Hajj pilgrimage
Interregnum		1773	1773	Regency by Sultans elder sister Amina I. Her husband Ali Shahbandar took power during the regency, and Dhiyamigili dynasty lost the throne in the cascade of events that followed. Mohamed Manikfaan of Huraa usurped the throne and later abdicated in favour of his nephew who became Sultan Muizzuddin. Amina and her husband were banished to a remote island in Laamu Atoll.

== Huraa dynasty (first restoration) ==
=== Sultan ===
Name	Regnal Name	Monarch from	Monarch until	Notes
Sultan Muhammad Shamsuddeen II	Keerithi Maha Radun (no coronation)	1774	1774	Uncle of Sultan Hasan 'Izz ud-din.
Sultan Muhammad Mu'iz ud-din	Keerithi Maha Radun (no coronation)	1774	1779	Son of Sultan Hasan 'Izz ud-din. Popularly known as Kalhu Bandaarain
Sultan Hassan Nooraddeen I	Keerithi Maha Radun (no coronation)	1779	1799	Brother of Sultan Muhammad Mu'iz ud-din.
Sultan Muhammad Mueenuddeen I	Keerithi Maha Radun (no coronation)	1799	1835	Son of Sultan Hassan Nooraddeen I.
Sultan Muhammad Imaaduddeen IV	Kula Sudha Ira Siyaaka Saasthura Audha Keerithi Katthiri Bovana	1835	1882	Son of Sultan Muhammad Mueenuddeen I.
Sultan Ibrahim Nooraddeen	Keerithi Maha Radun (no coronation)	1882	1886	Abdicated in favor of his nephew Muhammad Mueenuddeen.
Sultan Muhammad Mueenuddeen II	Keerithi Maha Radun (no coronation)	1886	1888	Abdicated in favour of his uncle the former Sultan Ibrahim Nooraddeen.
Sultan Ibrahim Nooraddeen	Keerithi Maha Radun (no coronation)	1888	1892	Second reign.
Sultan Muhammad Imaaduddeen V	Keerithi Maha Radun (no coronation)	1892	1893	His cousin Hassan Nooreddine Maandhoogey Manippulu acted as his regent due to his age. The regent abdicated in his name in favour of his older half brother.
Sultan Muhammad Shamsuddeen III	Keerithi Maha Radun (no coronation)	1893	1893	Brother of Sultan Muhammad Imaaduddeen V. His cousin Hassan Nooreddine Maandhoogey Manippulu acted as his regent due to his age. His cousin abdicated in his name and assumed the throne himself.
Sultan Muhammad Imaaduddeen VI	Keerithi Maha Radun (no coronation)	1893	1902	Former regent for Sultans Muhammad Imaaduddeen V and Muhammad Shamsuddeen III. Deposed while in the Ottoman Empire.
Sultan Muhammad Shamsuddeen III	Kula Sundhura Katthiri Bavana	1902	1934	Second reign which ended when he was deposed and exiled.
Sultan Hassan Nooraddeen II	Kula Sudha Ira Siyaaka Saasthura Audha Keerithi Katthiri Bavana	1935	1943	Forced to abdicate.
Interregnum		1944	1952	Abdul Majeed Didi was elected Sultan but was never installed and continued to live in Ceylon. Maldives ruled by Council of Regency headed for a time by former Sultan Hassan Nooraddeen II. Following the death of Abdul Majeed, and after a national referendum, the Maldives became a republic.

== First Republic of Maldives ==
=== President ===
Political parties

Rayyithunge Muthagaddim Party

No.	Portrait	Name (Birth–Death)	Election	Term of office			Party	Vice President
No.	Portrait	Name (Birth–Death)	Election	Took office	Left office	Time in office	Party	Vice President
1		Mohamed Amin Didi (1910–1954)	1952	1 January 1953	2 September 1953	244 days	Rayyithunge Muthagaddim Party	Ibrahim Muhammad Didi
–		Ibrahim Muhammad Didi (1902–1981) (Acting president)	—	2 September 1953	7 March 1954	186 days	Rayyithunge Muthagaddim Party	Vacant

== Huraa dynasty (second restoration) ==
No.	Portrait	Name (Birth–Death)	Election	Term of office			Party	Vice President
No.	Portrait	Name (Birth–Death)	Election	Took office	Left office	Time in office	Party	Vice President
	Sultanate of the Maldives (1954–1968)							
—		Muhammad Fareed Didi (1901–1969); Sultan (King from 1965)	—	7 March 1954	11 November 1968	14 years, 249 days	The Royal Family	—

== President of the United Suvadive Republic ==
No.	Portrait	Name (Birth–Death)	Election	Term of office			Party	Vice President
No.	Portrait	Name (Birth–Death)	Election	Took office	Left office	Time in office	Party	Vice President
—		Abdullah Afeef	—	2 January 1959	23 September 1963	14 years, 249 days	-	—

== Second Republic of Maldives ==
=== President ===
Political parties

Independent
Dhivehi Rayyithunge Party
Maldivian Democratic Party
Gaumee Itthihaad
People's National Congress
Progressive Party of Maldives
Jumhooree Party

No.	Portrait	Name (Birth–Death)	Election	Term of office			Party	Vice President
No.	Portrait	Name (Birth–Death)	Election	Took office	Left office	Time in office	Party	Vice President
2		Ibrahim Nasir (1926–2008)	1968	11 November 1968	11 November 1978	10 years	Independent	Office abolished
2		Ibrahim Nasir (1926–2008)	1973	11 November 1968	11 November 1978	10 years	Independent	Abdul Sattar Moosa Didi; Ahmad Hilmy Didi; Ibrahim Shihab; Ali Maniku; Hassan Zareer
3		Maumoon Abdul Gayoom (1937–)	1978	11 November 1978	11 November 2008	30 years	Independent (until 21 February 2005)	Office vacant
3		Maumoon Abdul Gayoom (1937–)	1983	11 November 1978	11 November 2008	30 years	Independent (until 21 February 2005)	Office vacant
3		Maumoon Abdul Gayoom (1937–)	1988	11 November 1978	11 November 2008	30 years	Independent (until 21 February 2005)	Office vacant
3		Maumoon Abdul Gayoom (1937–)	1993	11 November 1978	11 November 2008	30 years	Independent (until 21 February 2005)	Office vacant
3		Maumoon Abdul Gayoom (1937–)	1998	11 November 1978	11 November 2008	30 years	Independent (until 21 February 2005)	Office vacant
3		Maumoon Abdul Gayoom (1937–)	2003	11 November 1978	11 November 2008	30 years	Independent (until 21 February 2005)	Office vacant
		Maumoon Abdul Gayoom (1937–)	2003	11 November 1978	11 November 2008	30 years	Dhivehi Rayyithunge Party	Office vacant
4		Mohamed Nasheed (1967–)	2008	11 November 2008	7 February 2012	3 years, 88 days	Maldivian Democratic Party	Mohamed Waheed Hassan
5		Mohamed Waheed Hassan (1953–)	—	7 February 2012	17 November 2013	1 year, 283 days	Gaumee Itthihaad	Mohamed Waheed Deen
6		Abdulla Yameen (1959–)	2013	17 November 2013	17 November 2018	5 years	Progressive Party of Maldives	Mohamed Jameel Ahmed
6		Abdulla Yameen (1959–)	2013	17 November 2013	17 November 2018	5 years	Progressive Party of Maldives	Ahmed Adeeb
6		Abdulla Yameen (1959–)	2013	17 November 2013	17 November 2018	5 years	Progressive Party of Maldives	Abdulla Jihad
7		Ibrahim Mohamed Solih (1962–)	2018	17 November 2018	17 November 2023	5 years	Maldivian Democratic Party	Faisal Naseem
8		Mohamed Muizzu (1978–)	2023	17 November 2023	Incumbent	2 years, 343 days	People's National Congress	Hussain Mohamed Latheef

== See also ==
- History of the Maldives
- List of Maldivian monarchs
- List of Maldivian presidents by age
- President of the Maldives

== Notes ==
- Regnal names are in ancient Maldive language. The names are followed with "Maha Radun" for Kings are "Maha Rehendi" for Queens.
- Sometimes there were no coronation ceremony and for those they were called "Keerithi Maha Radun" for Kings and "Keerithi Maha Rehendi" for Queens.
