= List of state leaders in 15th-century South Asia =

This is a list of state leaders in the 15th century (1401–1500) AD, of South Asia. These polities are generally sovereign states, but excludes minor dependent territories, whose leaders can be found listed under territorial governors in the 15th century. For completeness, these lists can include colonies, protectorates, or other dependent territories that have since gained sovereignty.

== Bengal and Northeast India ==
- Ahom kingdom (complete list) –

- Sudangphaa, King (1397–1407)
- Sujangphaa, King (1407–1422)
- Suphakphaa, King (1422–1439)
- Susenphaa, King (1439–1488)
- Suhenphaa, King (1488–1493)
- Supimphaa, King (1493–1497)
- Suhungmung, King (1497–1539)

- Bengal Sultanate: Ilyas Shahi dynasty (complete list) –

- Ghiyasuddin Azam Shah, Sultan (1390–1411)
- Saifuddin Hamza Shah, Sultan (1411–1412)
- Shihabuddin Bayazid Shah, Sultan (1412–1414)
- Raja Ganesha, Sultan (1414–1415)
- Jalaluddin Muhammad Shah, Sultan (1415–1416)
- Raja Ganesha, Sultan (1416–1418)
- Jalaluddin Muhammad Shah, Sultan (1418–1433)
- Shamsuddin Ahmad Shah, Sultan (1433–1435)
- Mahmud Shah, Sultan (1435–1459)
- Rukunuddin Barbak Shah, Sultan (1459–1474)
- Shamsuddin Yusuf Shah, Sultan (1474–1481)
- Nuruddin Sikandar Shah, Sultan (1481)
- Jalaaluddin Fateh Shah, Sultan (1481–1487)

- Bengal Sultanate: Hussain Shahi dynasty (complete list) –

- Alauddin Husain Shah, Sultan (1494–1519)

- Chutia Kingdom (complete list) –

- Karmadhwajpal, King (1383–1401)
- Satyanarayan, King (1401–1421)
- Laksminarayan, King (1421–1439)
- Dharmanarayan, King (1439–1458)
- Pratyashnarayan, King (1458–1480)
- Purnadhabnarayan, King (1480–1502)

- Kamata Kingdom (complete list) –

Baro-Bhuyan dynasty
- Sukranka, King (1400–1415)
- Mriganka, King (1415–1440)
Khen dynasty
- Niladhwaj, King (1440–1460)
- Chakradhwaj, King (1460–1480)
- Nilambar, King (1480–1498)

- Mallabhum (complete list) –

- Shiv Singh Malla, King (1370–1407)
- Madan Malla, King (1407–1420)
- Chandra Malla, King (1460–1501)

- Kingdom of Manipur (complete list) –

- Punsipa, King (1404–1432)
- Ningthoukhompa, King (1432–1467)
- Senpi Kiyampa, King (1467–1508)

- Twipra Kingdom –

- Dhanya Manikya, King (1463–1515)

== India ==
- Amber Kingdom (complete list) –

- Narsingh, King (1388–1428)
- Banbir, King (1428–1439)
- Udharn, King (1439–1467)
- Chandrasen, King (1467–1503)

- Bahmani Sultanate (complete list) –

- Taj ud-Din Firuz Shah, Sultan (1397–1422)
- Ahmad Shah I Wali, Sultan (1422–1435)
- Ala ud din Ahmad Shah II, Sultan (1436–1458)
- Ala ud din Humayun Shah, Sultan (1458–1461)
- Nizam-Ud-Din Ahmad III, Sultan (1461–1463)
- Muhammad Shah III Lashkari, Sultan (1463–1482)
- Mahmood Shah Bahmani II(1482–1518)

- Berar Sultanate of the Deccan (complete list) –

- Fathullah Imad-ul-Mulk, Sultan (1490–1504)

- Bidar Sultanate of the Deccan (complete list) –

- Qasim Barid I, Prime Minister (1489–1504)

- Bijapur Sultanate: Adil Shahi dynasty of the Deccan (complete list) –

- Yusuf Adil Shah, Sultan (1490–1511)

- Bikaner

- Kings (complete list) –

- Bika, Rao (1465–1504)

- Dewans (complete list) –

- Bachhraj / Jodha, Dewan (1460–1465)
- Bachhraj / Bika, Dewan (1465–1505)

- Chera Perumals of Makotai (complete list) –

- Vira Ravi Varma, King (1383–1416)
- Vira Ravi Ravi Varma, King (1416–1417)
- Vira Kerala Martanda Varma, King (1383)
- Chera Udaya Martanda Varma, King (1383–1444)
- Vira Ravi Varma, King (1444–1458)
- Sankhara Sri Vira Rama Martanda Varma, King (1458–1468)
- Vira Kodai Sri Aditya Varma, King (1468–1484
- Vira Ravi Ravi Varma, King (1484–1503)

- Kingdom of Cochin (complete list) –

- Unniraman Koyikal I, Maharaja (c.1500–1503)

- Delhi Sultanate: Tughlaq dynasty (complete list) –

- Muhammad Shah Tughuluq IV, Sultan (1394–1413)

- Delhi Sultanate: Sayyid dynasty (complete list) –

- Khizr Khan, Sultan (1414–1421)
- Mubarak Shah, Sultan (1421–1434)
- Muhammad Shah, Sultan (1434–1445)
- Alam Shah, Sultan (1445–1451)

- Delhi Sultanate: Lodi dynasty (complete list) –

- Bahlol Khan Lodi, Sultan (1451–1489)
- Sikandar Lodi, Sultan (1489–1517)

- Dungarpur (complete list) –

- Udai Singh, Maharawal (1497–1527)

- Farooqui dynasty (complete list) –

- Nasir Khan, Sultan (1399–1437)
- Miran Adil Khan I, Sultan (1437–1441)
- Miran Mubarak Khan, Sultan (1441–1457)
- Miran Adil Khan II, Sultan (1457–1501)

- Gajapati Kingdom (complete list) –

- Kapilendra Deva, King (1434–1466)
- Purushottama Deva, King (1466–1497)
- Prataparudra Deva, King (1497–1540)

- Eastern Ganga dynasty (complete list) –

- Narasimha Deva IV, King (1379–1424)
- Bhanu Deva IV, King (1424–1434)

- Garhwal Kingdom (complete list) –

- Sundar Pal, King (1398–1413)
- Hansdev Pal, King (1413–1426)
- Vijay Pal, King (1426–1437)
- Sahaj Pal, King (1437–1473)
- Bahadur Shah, King (1473–1498)
- Man Shah, King (1498–1518)

- Gujarat Sultanate (complete list) –

- Muzaffar Shah I, Sultan (1391–1403, 1404–1411)
- Muhammad Shah I, Sultan (1403–1404)
- Ahmad Shah I, Sultan (1411–1442)
- Muhammad Shah II, Sultan (1442–1451)
- Ahmad Shah II, Sultan (1451–1458)
- Daud Shah, Sultan (1458)
- Mahmud Begada, Sultan (1458–1511)

- Jaisalmer (complete list) –

- Kehar Singh II, Rawal (1335–1402)
- Lachhman Singh, Rawal (1402–1436)
- Bersi Singh, Rawal (1436–1448)
- Chachak Deo Singh II, Rawal (1448–1457)
- Devidas Singh, Rawal (1457–1497)
- Jaitsi Singh II, Rawal (1497–1530)

- Jaunpur Sultanate (complete list) –

- Malik Qaranfal, Sultan (1399–1402)
- Ibrahim Khan, Sultan (1402–1440)
- Mahmud Khan, Sultan (1440–1457)
- Bhi Khan, Sultan (1457–1458)
- Hussain Khan, Sultan (1458–1479)

- Jawhar (complete list) –

- Nemshah I, Raja (1400–1422)
- Bhimshah, Raja (1422–1435)
- Deobarao, Raja (1435–1490)
- Krishnashah I Krishnarao Mukne, Raja (1490–16th century)

- Kahlur (complete list) –

- Rattan Chand, Raja (1355–1406)
- Narandar Chand, Raja (15th century)
- Fath Chand, Raja (15th century)
- Pahar Chand, Raja (15th century)
- Ram Chand, Raja (15th–16th century)

- Kumaon Kingdom: Chand (complete list) –

- Garur Gyan Chand, King (1374–1419)
- Harihar Chand, King (1419–1420)
- Udyan Chand, King (1420–1421)
- Atma Chand II, King (1421–1422)
- Hari Chand II, King (1422–1423)
- Vikram Chand, King (1423–1437)
- Bharati Chand, King (1437–1450)
- Ratna Chand, King (1450–1488)
- Kirti Chand, King (1488–1503)

- Kingdom of Kutch (complete list) –

- Kaiyaji, King (1386–?)
- Amarji, King (1406–?)
- Bhhemji, King (1429–?)
- Hamirji, King (1472–?)

- Malwa Sultanate (complete list) –

- Dilawar Khan, Sultan (1401–1406)
- Hoshang Shah, Sultan (1406–1435)
- Taj-ud-Din Muhammad Shah, Sultan (1435–1436)
- Mahmud Khalji, Sultan (1436–1469)
- Ghiyas-ud-Din Shah, Sultan (1469–1500)
- Nasir-ud-Din Shah, Sultan (1500–1510)

- Kingdom of Marwar/ Jodhpur (complete list) –

- Chandra, Rao (1383–1424)
- Kanha, Rao (1424–1427)
- Ranmal, Rao (1427–1438)
- Jodha, Rao (1438–1489)
- Satal, Rao (1489–1492)
- Suja, Rao (1492–1515)

- Rajpipla (complete list) –

- Bhansinhji, Maharana (14th–15th century)
- Gomelsinhji, Maharana (?–1421)
- Vijaypalji, Maharana (1421–?)
- Harisinhji, Maharana (?–c.1463)
- Bhimdev, Maharana (1463–c.1526)

- Reddi Kingdom (complete list) –

- Kumaragiri Reddi, King (1386–1402)
- Kataya Vema Reddi, King (1395–1414)
- Peda Komati Vema Reddi, King (1402–1420)
- Racha Vema Reddy, King (1420–1424)
- Allada Reddi, King (1414–1423)
- Veerabhadra Reddi, King (1423–1448)

- Sisodia (complete list) –

- Lakha Singh, Rajput (1382–1421)
- Mokal Singh, Rajput (1421–1433)
- Rana Kumbha, Rajput (1433–1468)
- Udai Singh I, Rajput (1468–1473)
- Rana Raimal, Rajput (1473–1508)

- Tripura: Manikya dynasty (complete list) –

- Maha Manikya, Maharaja (c.1400–1431)
- Dharma Manikya I, Maharaja (1431–1462)
- Ratna Manikya I, Maharaja (1462–c.1487)
- Pratap Manikya, Maharaja (c.1487)
- Vijaya Manikya I, Maharaja (1488)
- Mukut Manikya, Maharaja (1489)
- Dhanya Manikya, Maharaja (1490–1515)

- Udaipur (complete list) –

- Lakha, Maharana (1382–1421)
- Mokal, Maharana (1421–1433)
- Kumbha, Maharana (1433–1468)
- Udai Singh I, Maharana (1468–1473)
- Rai Mal, Maharana (1473–1509)

- Vijayanagara Empire: Sangama dynasty (complete list) –

- Harihara Raya II, King (1377–1404)
- Virupaksha Raya, King (1404–1405)
- Bukka Raya II, King (1405–1406)
- Deva Raya I, King (1406–1422)
- Ramachandra Raya, King (1422)
- Vira Vijaya Bukka Raya, King (1422–1424)
- Deva Raya II, King (1424–1446)
- Mallikarjuna Raya, King (1446–1465)
- Virupaksha Raya II, King (1465–1485)
- Praudha Raya, King (1485)

- Vijayanagara Empire: Saluva dynasty (complete list) –

- Saluva Narasimha Deva Raya, King (1485–1491)
- Thimma Bhupala, King (1491)
- Narasimha Raya II, King (1491–1505)

- Zamorin of Calicut (complete list) –

- Mana Vikrama the Great, Samoothiri (1468–1474)

== Maldives ==
- Sultanate of the Maldives: Hilaaly Dynasty (complete list) –

- Nasiruddine, Sultan (1409–1411)
- Hassan II, Sultan (1411)
- Isa, Sultan (1411)
- Ibrahim I, Sultan (1411–1421)
- Osman II, Sultan (1421)
- Danna Mohamed, Sultan (1421)
- Yoosuf II, Sultan (1421–1443)
- Aboobakuru I, Sultan (1443)
- Hasan III, Sultan (1443–1467)
- Sayyid Mohamed, Sultan (1467)
- Hasan III, Sultan (1467–1468)
- Mohamed II, Sultan (1468–1480)
- Hassan IV, Sultan (1480)
- Omar II, Sultan (1480–1484)
- Hassan V, Sultan (1484–1485)
- Hassan IV, Sultan (1485–1491)
- Hassan VI, Sultan (1491–1492)
- Ibrahim II, Sultan (1492)
- Kalu Mohamed, Sultan (1492)
- Yoosuf III, Sultan (1492–1493)
- Ali II, Sultan (1493–1495)
- Kalu Mohamed, Sultan (1495–1510)

== Nepal ==
- Malla (Kathmandu Valley) (complete list) –

- Jayakiti Malla, King (c.1395–1403)
- Jayadharma Malla, King (c.1395–1408)
- Jayayakshya Malla, King (c.1428–1482)
- Ratna Malla, Raja (1482–1520)

== Pakistan ==
- Samma dynasty (complete list) –

- Fath Khan, Jam (1398–1414)
- Tughluq, Jam (1414–1442)
- Mubarak, Jam (1442)
- Sikandar, Jam (1442–1444)
- Raidhan, Jam (1444–1453)
- Sanjar, Jam (1453–1461)
- Nizamuddin II, Jam (1461–1508)

- Langah Sultanate –

- Qutbudin Rai Sahra Langah, Sultan (1445–1469)
- Husseyn Langah I, Sultan (1469–1502)

== Sri Lanka ==
- Kingdom of Gampola (complete list) –

- Vira Alakesvara, King (1397–1409)
- Parakrama Bahu Epa, King (1409–1412)

- Jaffna Kingdom (complete list) –

- Jeyaveera Cinkaiariyan, King (1380–1410)
- Gunaveera Cinkaiariyan, King (1410–1440)
- Kanakasooriya Cinkaiariyan, King (1440–1450)
- Bhuvanekabahu VI, King (1450–1467)
- Kanakasooriya Cinkaiariyan, King (1467–1478)
- Singai Pararasasegaram, King (1478–1519)

- Kingdom of Kandy (complete list) –

- Sena Sammatha Wickramabahu, King (1473–1511)

- Kingdom of Kotte (complete list) –

- Parakramabahu VI, King (1412–1467)
- Jayabahu II, King (1467–1472)
- Bhuvanekabahu VI, King (1472–1480)
- Parakramabahu VII, King (1480–1484)
- Parakramabahu VIII, King (1484–1518)
