= List of Maldivian monarchs =

Flag of the Sultan of the Maldives

Dynasty origin islands

Maldives was turned into a Sultanate in 1153 when the Buddhist King Dhovemi converted to Islam. Prior to that the Maldives was a Buddhist Kingdom, a Hindu Kingdom and before that a matriarchal societies across the different atolls in the country. All the rulers before King Koimala only ruled over parts of the Maldives or Deeva Maari (and Dheeva Mahal) as it was known then. Koimala was the first king to rule over all the islands of the Maldives.

The formal title of the Sultan up to 1965 was, Sultan of Land and Sea, Lord of the twelve-thousand islands and Sultan of the Maldives with the style Highness. After independence in 1965 the Sultan assumed the title King with the style Majesty. This style was used until 1968, when the Maldives became a republic for the second time. The main official Royal residence of the Sultan was the Etherekoilu, a palace in Malé.

The reigns of Sultans are from three sources. Taarikh (also known as the Tarikh lslam Diba Mahal) by Maldivian chronicler Hasan Taj Al-Din written in Arabic which covers 670 years of Maldives history, the Loamaafaanu copper plates and the third source called Raadhavalhi which was written in 1757 using both Dhives Akuru and Thaana.

The seven dynasties of Maldives were:

- Theemuge dynasty
- Hilaalee dynasty
- Utheemu dynasty
- Dhevvadhoo dynasty
- Isdhoo dynasty
- Dhiyamigili dynasty
- Huraa dynasty

== Kingdom of Aditta Vansa to Theemuge dynasty ==
=== Solar dynasty (Aditta Vansa) ===
Name	Monarch from	Monarch until	Notes
Sri Soorudasaruna Adeettiya	573 BCE	530 BCE	King Sri Soorudasaruna Adeettiya is remembered in Maldivian tradition as the founder of the ancient monarchy, reigning from 573 to 530 BCE. He is said to have been the son of a Kalingan (eastern Indian) royal father and a royal mother from Sarunadipa (Sumatra).
Unknown number of rulers			The Mapanansa, the copper plates on which the history of the Kings of Solar Dynasty was written were lost quite early on. A 4th century notice written by Ammianus Marcellinus (362 CE) speaks of gifts sent to the Roman emperor Julian by a deputation from the nation of "Divi". The name "Divi" is very similar to "Dheyvi" who were the first settlers of Maldives.
Srimati Damahara	953	990	She is also spelled as Damahaar. Last ruler of the Solar Dynasty. It is unclear from the records how many other rulers ruled between the reigns of King Sri Soorudasaruna Adeettiya and Queen Damahara. Married Prince Sri Mahabaladitya from the Kalinga kingdom who later became the first king of the Lunar Dynasty. Al-Jawaliqi, writing in 1135 CE looking at earlier records, describes a queen of Maldives named "Danhara" ruling on an island called "Abannba".

=== Lunar dynasty (Soma Vansa) ===
Name	Monarch from	Monarch until	Notes
Sri Mahabaladitya	around 990	unknown	Prince from Kalinga kingdom of India. Married Queen Damahara of the Solar dynasty to become the ruler of Dheeva Maari. Early during his reign King Rajaraja I of Chola captured the northern atolls Minicoy and Thiladhummathi. Although some sources indicate the start of the reign as when Rajaraja I invaded Maldives, a Chinese document from the Tang dynasty, records the visits of people from Mo-lai (Maldives) to China bringing with them gifts from their king, Che-p'o-lo-ti-to (Sri Mahabalāditya) in 658 CE and also in 662 CE. The king mentioned must have been a king of the Solar dynasty.
Sri Laukabarana	11th cent.	11th cent.	King of the Lunar dynasty. He is son or grandson of Queen Damahara. His name is alternatively written as Sri Loaka Abaaruna.
Sri Maha Sandura	~11th cent.	unknown	Son of King Laukabarana. He had a daughter Princess Kamanhaar (also known as Kamanaar or Rehendihaar), who was banished to the island then called Is-Midu (Addu Meedhoo today). With her she took the Mapanansa, the copper plates in which the history of the kings of Solar dynasty was written. The Mapanansa were later buried by a certain Al-Muhaddith Hassan, and this is why such little information survived about the Solar dynasty.
Sri Bovana Ananda	unknown	before 1117	Son of King Laukabarana and brother of King Maha Sandura. He is the father of King Koimala.

== Theemuge dynasty (1121–1388) ==
Name	Regnal Name	Duration of Reign	Monarch from	Monarch until	Notes
King Mahaabarana Adeettiya (Koimala)	Suvasthi Shri Theemuge Rannafireyru Mini Mahaabarana Mahaaradhun	21 years	1121	1141	The first king of the Royal House of Theemugey.
King Dhovemi Later Sultan Muhammad al-Adil	Siri Bavanditta Maha Radun	35 years	1141	1176	Reigned as a Buddhist until 1153. Son of Henevi Maava Kilege, sister of Koimala. A member of the Soma or Homa (Lunar) dynasty. Converted to Islam in 1153, assumed the title Sultan and founded the Theemuge dynasty. He was the famous Dharumavantha Radun or the Benevolent King.
Sultan Muthey	Bavana Abaruna Maha Radun	8 years	1176	1184	Mother's sister's son of Dhovemi
Sultan Ali b. Reke Hiriya	Dammara-nanda Maha Radun	8 years	1184	1192	
Sultan Dinei	Fanaditta Maha Radun	6 years	1192	1198	The Lōmāfānu was written during Sultan Dhinei's reign.
Sultan Dihei	Dagata Abaruna Maha Radun	15 years	1198	1213	Brother of Sultan Dhinei I
Sultan Wadi	Dagata Suvara Maha Radun	19 years	1213	1232	Brother of Sultans Dhinei I and Dhinei II
Sultan Valla Dio	Rada-rada Suvara Maha Radun	25 years	1232	1257	Brother of Sultans Dhinei I, Dhinei II and Wadi
Sultan Hudei	Vira Abaruna Maha Radun	6 years	1257	1263	
Sultan Aima	Loka Suvara Maha Radun	2 years	1263	1265	
Sultan Hiley (Ali)	Sinja Abaruna Maha Radun	2 years	1265	1267	
Sultan Kalaminja b. Aydage	Madini Survara Maha Radun	1 year	1267	1268	
Sultan Uda (Auda)	Arida Suvara Maha Radun	9 years	1268	1277	Son of Sultan Wadi
Sultan Ali II	Arida Suvara Maha Radun	10 years	1277	1287	Son of Sultan Audha
Sultan Yoosuf	Bavana Aditta Maha Radun	6 years	1287	1293	Brother of Sultan Hali II
Sultan Salah al-Din b. Yusuf	Some Sivara Maha Radun	8 years	1293	1301	Son of Sultan Yoosuf I
Sultan Da'ud b. Yusuf	Sundura Bavana Maha Radun	5 years	1301	1306	Son of Sultan Yoosuf I
Sultan Umar Vira (Abu Fath Jalal al-Din)	Loka Abaruna Maha Radun	34 years	1306	1340	Son of Sultan Salis
Sultan Shihab al-Din Ahmad	Loka Aditta Maha Radun	7 years	1340	1347 Deposed and assassinated	Son of Sultan Omar I, deposed, banished and assassinated by sister Khadijah.
Sultana Rehindi Kabadi Kilege (Khadija)	Rada Abaruna Maha Radun	15 years	1347	1362 Deposed	Deposed by her first husband Mohamed el-Jameel.
Sultan Mohamed el-Jamil	Bavana Suja Maha Radun	1 year	1362	1363 Deposed and assassinated	First Husband of Sultana Khadijah. Assassinated by estranged wife Khadijah. He was nicknamed Handsome Mohamed.
Sultana Rehendi (Khadijah)	Rada Abaruna Maha Radun	10 years	1363	1373 Deposed	Second reign on assassination of first husband Sultan Mohamed el-Jameel. Deposed for a second time by her second husband Abdullah.
Sultan Abdullah Kilege	Dammaru Aaditta Maha Radun	3 years	1373	1376 Deposed and assassinated	Second husband of Sultana Khadijah. Assassinated by wife Khadijah.
Sultana Rehendi (Khadijah)	Rada Abaruna Maha Radun	3 years	1376	1379	Third reign
Sultana Radafati (Adafate) Kabadi Kilege	Soma Aburana Maha Radun	1 year	1379	1380 Deposed	Daughter of Sultan Omar I, half sister of Sultana Khadijah. Deposed by husband Mohamed.
Sultan Mohamed I	Sundura Abaruna Maha Radun	4 years	1380	1384	Husband of Sultana Raadhafathi. Son of Kaeumani Kaulhanna Kilege. He is from the island of Maakurathu in Raa Atoll hence he is also known as Maakurathu Mohamed Rasgefaan.
Sultana Da'inu Kabadi Kilege	Natta Abaruna Maha Radun	3 years	1385	1388 Deposed	Daughter of Sultan Mohamed I. Deposed by husband Abdullah.
Sultan Abdullah	Soma Abaruna Maha Radun	less than 1 year	1388	1388	Husband of Sultana Dhaain. Some records call him a regent (Henevi-rasge).
Sultan Uthman al-Fahandavi	Sundura Aditta Maha Radun	less than 1 year	1388	1388	Sultan Usman I Former Imam to Raadhafathi and Dhaain Last of the Lunar dynasty. Grave found in Thaa Atoll, Guraidhoo by H.C.P Bells expedition.

== Hilaalee dynasty (1388–1632) ==
Name	Regnal Name	Duration of Reign	Monarch from	Monarch until	Notes
Sultan Hasan I	Bavana	10 years	1388	1398	First of the Hilaaly dynasty Son of Golhaavahi Kambulo (Kalavahi Kabulo) and Kulhiveri Hilaalu Kaeulhanna Kaloge son of Muslim Abbas of Hulhule
Sultan Ibrahim I	Dhammaru Veeru	less than 1 year	1398	1398 Deposed	Son of Sultan Hassan I Deposed by his uncle Hussain.
Sultan Husayn I	Loka Veeru	11 years	1398	1409	Brother of Sultan Hassan I Assumed the throne after deposing his nephew Sultan Ibrahim I.
Sultan Nasir al-Din al-Gulavihi	Veeru Abaarana	2 years	1409	1411	Introduced the Islamic penal code. Possibly a member of the Lunar dynasty
Sultan Hasan Hilali	Keerithi Maha Radun (no coronation)	less than 1 year	1411	1411 Accidental death	Sultan Hassan II. Drowned in a tank. Grave found in Thaa Atoll, Guraidhoo by H.C.P Bells expedition.
Sultan Isa	Bavana Sundhura	less than 1 year	1411	1411	Brother of Sultan Hassan II
Sultan Ibrahim I	Dhammaru Veeru	10 years	1411	1421	Second reign, first reigned in 1398.
Sultan Uthman II	Dhammaru Loaka	less than 1 year	1421	1421	Son of Sultan Osman I
Sultan Muhammad	Raadha Bavana	less than 1 year	1421	1421	Uncle of Sultans Hassan I and Hussain I Prime Minister to Osman I
Sultan Yusuf II	Loka Aananadha	22 years	1421	1443	Son of Sultan Hassan I
Sultan Abu Bakr I	Bavana Sooja	less than 1 year	1443	1443 Killed in battle	Son of Sultan Hassan I Half brother of Sultan Yoosuf II Killed in battle with the Portuguese who came to summon the Council of Ministers of the Maldives to Cochin.
Sultan Hasan III	Raadha Veeru	24 years	1443	1467	Son of Sultan Aboobakuru I Deposed by Sayyid Mohamed while abroad.
Sultan al-Sayyid Muhammad	Keerithi Maha Radun (no coronation)	less than 1 year	1467	1467 Deposed	Possible descendant of the Islamic prophet Muhammad. Deposed by Sultan Hassan III upon returning to Maldives.
Sultan Hasan III	Raadha Veeru	1 year	1467	1468	Second reign
Sultan Muhammadh II	Bavana Abaarana	12 years	1468	1480	Son of Sultan Hasan III
Sultan Hasan IV	Raadha Loka	less than 1 year	1480	1480 Deposed	Son of Sultan Mohamed IIDeposed by Omar II.
Sultan Umar II	Loka Sundhura	4 years	1480	1484	Son of Sultan Yoosuf II
Sultan Hasan V	Raadha Aanandha	1 year	1484	1485	Son of Sultan Omar II
Sultan Hasan IV	Raadha Loka	6 years	1485	1491	Second reign
Sultan al-Shaykh Hasan VI	Raadha Fanaveeru	1 year	1491	1492	Grandson of Sultan Aboobakuru I
Sultan Ibrahim II	Bavana Furasuddha	less than 1 year	1492	1492	Son of Omar II
Sultan Kalu Muhammad	Dhammaru Bavana	less than 1 year	1492	1492 Deposed	Son of Sultan Omar IIDeposed by his brother Yoosuf.
Sultan Yusuf III	Veeru Aanandha	1 year	1492	1493	Son of Sultan Omar II
Sultan Ali II	Audha Veeru	2 years	1493	1495	Grandson of Sultan Hassan I
Sultan Kalu Muhammad	Dhammaru Bavana	15 years	1495	1510 Deposed	Second reign Son of Sultan Omar II Deposed for a second time, this time by his nephew Hassan.
Sultan Hasan VII	Singa Veeeru	1 year	1510	1511	Son of Sultan Yoosuf III
Sultan al-Sharif Ahmad al-Makki	Suddha Bavana	2 years	1511	1513	An Arab from Mecca Possible descendant of Muhammad
Sultan Ali III	Aanandha	less than 1 year	1513	1513 Killed	Killed in a duel with his sister Burecca (Buraki Raani). Grandson of Sultan Aboobakuru ISon of Mohamed Farhana Kalo and Recca daughter of Aboobakuru I
Sultan Kalu Muhammad	Dhammaru Bavana	16 years	1513	1529	Third accession assisted by his wife Queen Burecca who killed her brother Ali III.
Sultan Hasan al-Shirazi VIII	Ran Mani Loka	20 years	1529	1549	Son of Sultan Kalu Mohamed and Fatuma Dio a concubine from Shiraz in Persia
Sultan Muhammad III	Singa Bavana	2 years	1549	1551 Assassinated	Assassinated by his brother Hassan who succeeded him. Son of Golhavahi Aysha Rani Kilege and Omar Maafaiy Kilege son of Kalu Mohamed and Aysha Rani Kilege daughter of Korari Kilege therefore grandson of Sultan Kalu Mohamed
Sultan Hasan IX	Dhirukusa Loka	1 year	1551	1552 Deposed	Brother of Mohamed III He was the first Maldivian and only member of its royalty to renounce Islam and convert to Christianity. He was deposed upon conversion, and known subsequently by the Lusitanian name of Dom Manoel.
Interregnum		2 years	1552	1554	Maldives ruled by a Council of Ministers.
Sultan Abu Bakr II	Asaalees Loka	3 years	1554	1557	Son of Ibrahim Faarhana Kilege and Sanfa Dio Former Prime Minister to Dom Manoel
Sultan Ali IV (Ali Rasgefaan)	Audha Siyaaka Katthiri	1 year	1557	1558 Killed in battle	Popularly known as Ali Rasgefaan He was killed in battle. Son of Prime Minister Abdur Rahman Dorhimeyna Kaloge and Sitti Rani Kilege He was married to Princess Aysha Rani Kilege aunt of Dom Manoel and daughter of Kalu Mohamed.
King Dom Manoel	Dhirikusa Loka (in absentia)	15 years	1558	1573	Restored as the King. Formerly known as Sultan Hassan IX A Maldivian Catholic named Andiri Andirin acted as his regent, while Manoel lived in Goa.
Interregnum		less than 1 year	1573	1573	Maldives ruled by Kateeb Mohamed Thakurufan of Utheemu after he assassinated Andiri Andirin, the regent of King Dom Manoel. As per a treaty he got refuge from Ali Raja of Cannanore, Mohamed Thakurufan's base of operation was Minicoy under the sovereignty of Cannanore. Keteeb Mohamed Thakurufan did not honour this promise. The Ali Raja demanded dominion over the Maldives, as promised to him by the Kateeb of Uteem. The nature of the relationship between Kateeb Mohamed Thakurufan and the Ali Raja of Cannanore was outlined in a letter sent by a later Ali Raja, Mariambe Ali-Adi Raja Bibi, to the Sultan Mohamed Mueenuddine I of the Maldives. The letter was dated Friday 17 Jamada-el-oula Anno Hegirae 1243 (7 December AD 1827). According to the letter Mohamed Thakurufan had entered into a treaty ceding sovereignty of the Maldives to the Ali Raja of Cannanore in the event Thakurufan was established in power in Male. (refer page 294 of Divehi Tarikh).
King Dom Manoel	Dhirikusa Loka	10 years	1573	1583	Kateeb Mohamed Thakurufan concluded a Treaty with King Dom Manoel to ward off the Ali Raja of Cannanore with whose help the Kateeb seized power in Male. Under the treaty Dom Manoel was restored but remained in Goa. The co-regents were Kateeb Muhammad Thakurufaanu of Utheem and his brother Hassan Thakurufan. The Kateeb conferred on himself the title of Sultan in 1583 upon Dom Manoel's death. This was in breach of the Treaty and was not legally binding.
King Dom João	Keerithi Maha Radun (no coronation)	20 years	1583	1603	Son of King Manoel, who remained in Goa. He had two brothers, Dom Francisco and Dom Pedro. Kateeb Mohamed Thakurufan and his brother Hassan Thakurufan ruled for King Dom João as co-regents. Kateeb Mohamed Thakurufan assumed the title of Sultan following the death of King Dom Manoel. He married a Portuguese Christian noblewoman, Donna Francisca Vasconelles and had two children Dom Philippe and Dona Inez. Ibrahim, also known as Kalaafaan (literally "Lord") was the de facto Sultan, but legally the regent of Kings Dom João and Dom Philippe who resided in Goa. He reigned from 1585 to 1609. Son of Mohamed Thakurufan, Kateeb of Utheemu and Rehendiye Goyye daughter of Cat Fatima of Boarhi Woods in Baarah Ibrahim Kalaafaan was the regent at the time of François Pyrard de Laval's detainment in the Maldives after the shipwreck.
King Dom Philippe	Keerithi Maha Radun (no coronation)	29 years	1603	1632	Son of King Dom João and Donna Francisca Vasconelles Al-Amira Kuda Kalu Kamanafaanu acted as regent from 1607 until 1609. She was the daughter of Hassan Thakurufaan and Sitti Maryam Maavaa Kuda Kamanafaanu Rani Kilege, daughter of Sultan Ali VI, Sultan of the Maldives, by his wife, Princess Aisha Kabafa'anu, daughter of Sultan Kalu Mohamed Hussain Faamuladeyri Kilege acted as regent from 1609 to 1620. Muhammad Imaduddin I acted as regent from 1620 to 1632. De-recognised in the Maldives after an abortive expedition with Portuguese assistance to abolish regency and assume power.

== Utheemu dynasty (1632–1692) ==
Name	Regnal Name	Duration of Reign	Monarch from	Monarch until	Notes
Sultan Muhammad Imaduddin I	Kula Sundhura Katthiri Bavana	16 years	1632	1648	Legally proclaimed sultan in 1632 Former regent for King Dom Philippe
Sultan Ibrahim Iskandar I	Kula Ran Meeba Katthiri Bavana	39 years	1648	1687	Son of Sultan Muhammad Imaduddin I
Sultan Kuda Muhammad	Maniranna Loka	4 years	1687	1691 Accidental death	Son of Sultan Ibrahim Iskandar I His mother Princess Maryam acted as regent due to his age. Killed with his mother while at sea in an explosion.
Sultan Muhammad Mohyeddine	Naakiree Sundhura	1 year	1691	1692	Re-established the Islamic penal code. Son of Dharanboodhoo Kadida Dio and Abu Naibu Hassan Dorhimeyna Kilege son of the Regent Hussain Famuladeyri Kilege

== Hamawi dynasty (1692) ==
Name	Regnal Name	Duration of Reign	Monarch from	Monarch until	Claim / relationship with predecessor(s)	Notes
Sultan Muhammad Shamsuddeen I	Mikaalha Madhaadheettha	less than 1 year	1692	1692 Possibly poisoned to death	Married Mariyam Kan'baafaanu who was the widow of Sultan Muhammad Mohyeddine	Arab mentor of Sultan Muhammad Mohyeddine He first visited Male during the reign of Ibrahim Iskandar I. He was probably poisoned to death. He coutured the re-establishment of the Islamic Penal code held by the previous Sultan Muhammad Mohyeddine and assigned Scholars to teach in Mosques. In his Sultanate Maldives was very peaceful and citizens became educated and religious. (refer page 67 to 69 of Divehi Tarikh)

== Dhevvadhoo dynasty (1692–1701) ==
Name	Regnal Name	Duration of Reign	Monarch from	Monarch until	Claim / relationship with predecessor(s)	Notes
Sultan Muhammad Saifuddin (Devvadhoo Rasgefaan)	Kula Ran Mani	9 years	1692	1701 Possibly poisoned to death	Married Mariyam Kan'baafaanu who was the widow of Sultan Muhammad Shamsedeen I Appointed as Sultan by request of Viziers	First Sultan of the Dhevvadhoo dynasty Popularly known as Dhevvadhoo Rasgefaanu, son of Ali Mafahaiy Kilege of Dhevvadhoo and Kakuni Dio Sultan Mohamed IV was married to Khadheeja Kanba daughter of Ibrahim Shah Bandar of Isdhoo (Isdhoo Bodu Velaanaa Thakurufaan) Devvadhoo Rasgefaan or Sultan Muahmmadh Ali V was grandson of Al Gazi Muhammad Shamsuddeen. He himself served as Chief Justice prior to Sultan. Devvadhoo Rasgefaan appointed the chronicler Hassan Thaajuddeen as his Chief Justice.

== Isdhoo dynasty (1701–1704) ==
Name	Regnal Name	Duration of Reign	Monarch from	Monarch until	Notes
Sultan Ali VII	Kula Ran Muiy	less than 1 year	1701	1701	Ali Shah Bandar or Isdu 'Ali Velana Thakuru'fa'anu, first Sultan of the Isdhoo dynasty Son of Ibrahim Shah Bandar Kilege of Isdhoo and Aysha Dio
Sultan Hasan X	Keerithi Maha Radun (no coronation)	less than 1 year	1701	1701 Abdicated	Son of Sultan Ali VII Abdicated for cousin Ibrahim Mudzhiruddine He is also known as Addu Hassan Manikfan
Sultan Ibrahim Muzhir al-Din	Muthey Ran Mani Loka	3 years	1701	1704 Deposed	First-cousin of Sultan Hasan X Deposed by his Prime Minister Muhammad Imaduddin during the regency of his spouse Fatima Kabafa'anu while on the Hajj pilgrimage.

== Dhiyamigili dynasty (1704–1759) ==
Name	Regnal Name	Duration of Reign	Monarch from	Monarch until	Claim / relationship with predecessor(s)	Notes
Sultan Muhammad Imaduddin II	Kula Sundhura Siyaaka Saasthura	16 years	1704	1720	Son of Sultan Ibrahim Muzhir al-Dins maternal (Athiree Kamana) aunt Amina Dio	Prime Minister to Sultan Ibrahim Mudzhiruddine First of the Dhiyamigili dynasty. Commissioned Hassan Taj al-Din to write the Ta’rīkh.
Sultan Ibrahim Iskandar II	Rannava Loka	30 years	1720	1750	Son of Sultan Muhammad Imaduddin II	
Sultan Muhammad Imaduddin III	Navaranna Keerithi	7 years	1750	1757 Died in captivity by Ali Raja	Son of Sultan Muhammad Imaduddin II	Held captive on Kavaratti island from 1752 until his death in 1757. In 1752 he was seized by the Ali Raja of Cannanore and transported to Kavaratti island in the Laccadives. Male was occupied. The occupation was ended by Muleegey Don Hassan Maniku. The sultan died in captivity. During this time Maldives was ruled by the captive sultan's niece Amina I of Maldives and his daughter Amina II. The de facto regent was Muleegey Don Hassan Maniku.
Interregnum		2 years	1757	1759		Regency continued in expectation of the return of the deceased Sultan's heir from captivity.
Sultana Amina I		1 year	1753	1754 Abdicated	Daughter of Sultan Ibrahim Iskandar II	Amina assumed the role of the ruler of Maldives in 1753 after Male was recaptured from the Malabars after 17 weeks of occupation. She was the daughter of Sultan Ibrahim Iskandar II and Aisha Manikfan. She abdicated the throne and moved to Addu Atoll in the south. She was later banished to various islands and eventually became the Ruler of Maldives for the second time as the regent during the reign of her younger brother Sultan Mohamed Ghiyasuddin in 1773.
Sultana Amina II		2 years	1757	1759	Daughter of Sultan Muhammad Imaduddin III	Amina succeeded her cousin in 1754 as nominal regent for her absent father the age of nine, while Muleegey Hassan Manikfaan managed the political affairs as de facto regent. Her father died in 1757 in Minicoy, after which she formally became monarch and queen regnant. In 1759 Sultan Hassan Izzuddin became monarch in absentia of Dhiyamigili Sultan.

=== Sultan in absentia until the return of Dhiyamigili heir Giyath al-Din ===
Name	Regnal Name	Duration of Reign	Monarch from	Monarch until	Claim / relationship with predecessor(s)	Notes
Sultan Hasan 'Izz ud-din	Kula Ran Meeba Audha Keerithi Katthiri Bavana	7 years	1759	1766 Abdicated	Ascended after hearing news of Sultan Muhammadh Imaduddin III's demise to fill the throne in absentia of Dhiyamigili heir to throne who was held captive by Ali Raja. Abdicated throne to Sultan Muhammadh Ghiyath al-Din on his return and died on 2 February 1767.	Also known as Muleegey Don Hassan Maniku or Don Bandaara Don Bandaara was son of Amina Dio daughter of Mohamed Kateeb of island Muli of Maldives and Huraa Mohamed Faamuladeyri Thakurufan (from the island of Huraa).

=== Return of Giyath al-Din ===
Name	Regnal Name	Duration of Reign	Monarch from	Monarch until	Claim / relationship with predecessor(s)	Notes
Sultan Muhammad Ghiyath al-Din	Kula Ranmani Keerithi	8 years	1766	1774 Assassinated after the throne was seized.	Son of Sultan Ibrahim Iskandar II of Dhiyamigili Dynasty also known as Muhammadh Manikfaan.	Also known as Haajee Bandaarain Muhammadh Shams al-Din (later Sultan Muhammadh Shams al-Din Iskandar II) seized the throne when Sultan Ghiyath al-Din was on Hajj. Unaware of seizure of throne Ghiyath al-Din returned from Hajj and was killed during the reign of Huraa dynasty Sultan Muhammadh Mu'izz al-Din who is also known as Kalhu Bandaara. The last remaining heir of Dhiyamigili Prince Abdulla was banished to Fuvahmulah at the age of seven.

== Huraa dynasty (1774–1968) ==
Name	Regnal Name	Duration of Reign	Monarch from	Monarch until	Claim / relationship with predecessor(s)	Notes
Sultan Muhammad Shams al-Din Iskandar II	Keerithi Maha Radun (no coronation)	less than 1 year	1774 Ascended after seizing throne from Dhiyamigili Dynasty	1774	Seized the throne when Sultan Ghiyath al-Din was on Hajj. Ascended throne after an armed confrontation with Dhiyamigili dynasty supporters. After becoming the Sultan he looted and banished the aides of Sultan Ghiyath al-Din to various islands and seized the properties of Sultan Ghiyath al-Din.	Uncle of Sultan Hasan 'Izz ud-din.
Sultan Muhammad Mu'izz al-Din	Keerithi Maha Radun (no coronation)	5 years	1774	1779	Son of Sultan Hasan 'Izz ud-din who reigned in absentia for the return of Dhiyamigili heir Ghiyath al-Din. Sultan Ghiyath al-Din of Dhiyamigili dynasty was killed after he returned from Hajj in October 1774 during Sultan Muhammadh Mu'izz al-Din's reign.	When Sultan Ghiyath al-Din of Dhiyamigili dynasty returned after Hajj during Sultan Muhammadh Mu'izz al-Din's reign, instead of bringing Sultan Ghiyath al-Din to Male', he was killed by attaching weights to his feet and throwing overboard into the sea. The last remaining heir of Dhiyamigili Prince Abdulla was banished to Fuvahmulah at the age of seven. Sultan Muhammadh Mu'izz al-Din is popularly known as Kalhu Bandaarain. Sultan Muhammadh Mu'izz al-Din was married to Aminath Manikfaan from Isdhoo Dynasty and Aminath Didi from Dhiyamigili Dynasty.)
Sultan Hasan Nooraddeen I	Keerithi Maha Radun (no coronation)	20 years	1779	1799	Younger brother of Sultan Muhammad Mu'iz ud-din	Sultan Hassan Nooradeen I married Aishath Manikfaan from Addu, great-granddaughter of Isdhoo Dynasty Sultan Hassan X (Also known as Addu Hassan Manikfan)
Sultan Muhammad Mueenuddeen I	Keerithi Maha Radun (no coronation)	36 years	1799	1835	Son of Sultan Hassan Nooraddeen I	
Sultan Muhammad Imaaduddeen IV	Kula Sudha Ira Siyaaka Saasthura Audha Keerithi Katthiri Bovana	47 years	1835	1882	Son of Sultan Muhammad Mueenuddeen I	
Sultan Ibrahim Nooraddeen	Keerithi Maha Radun (no coronation)	4 years	1882	1886 Abdicated	Son of Imaaduddeen IV	Abdicated in favor of his nephew Muhammad Mueenuddeen.
Sultan Muhammad Mueenuddeen II	Keerithi Maha Radun (no coronation)	2 years	1886	1888 Abdicated	Nephew of Sultan Ibrahm Nooraddeen	On 16 December 1887, he accepted British protection and the nation became a protectorate.
Sultan Ibrahim Nooraddeen	Keerithi Maha Radun (no coronation)	4 years	1888	1892	Uncle of Sultan Muhammadh Mueenuddeen II	Second reign
Sultan Muhammad Imaaduddeen V	Keerithi Maha Radun (no coronation)	1 year	1892	1893 Abdicated		His cousin Hassan Nooreddine Maandhoogey Manippulu acted as his regent due to his age. The regent abdicated in his name in favour of his older half brother.
Sultan Muhammad Shamsuddeen III	Keerithi Maha Radun (no coronation)	less than 1 year	1893	1893 Abdicated	Brother of Sultan Muhammad Imaaduddeen V	His cousin Hassan Nooreddine Maandhoogey Manippulu acted as his regent due to his age. His cousin abdicated in his name and assumed the throne himself.
Sultan Muhammad Imaaduddeen VI	Keerithi Maha Radun (no coronation)	9 years	1893	1902 Deposed		Former regent for Sultans Muhammad Imaaduddeen V and Muhammad Shamsuddeen III. Deposed while in the Ottoman Empire.
Sultan Muhammad Shamsuddeen III	Kula Sundhura Katthiri Bavana	32 years	1902	1934 Deposed		Second reign and introduced the first Constitution which ended when he was deposed and exiled.
Sultan Hassan Nooraddeen II	Kula Sudha Ira Siyaaka Saasthura Audha Keerithi Katthiri Bavana	8 years	1935	1943 Forced to abdicate		
Sultan Abdul Majeed Didi	Keerithi Maha Radun (no coronation)	8 years	1944	1952		Abdul Majeed Didi was elected Sultan but continued to live in Ceylon. Maldives ruled by Council of Regency headed for a time by former Sultan Hassan Nooraddeen II.
Interregnum		2 years	1952	1954		Following the death of Abdul Majeed and after a national referendum the Maldives became a republic.
King Muhammad Fareed Didi	Keerithi Maha Radun (no coronation)	14 years	1954	1968		Grandson of Sultan Muhammad Mueenuddeen II and eldest son of Sultan Abdul Majeed Didi took the title of King Muhammad Fareed Didi in 1965 when the British protectorate of the Maldives ended. Deposed by a national referendum which decided to replace the sultanate with a republic.

== See also ==
- History of the Maldives
- Kingdom of Dheeva Maari
- List of head of state of the Maldives
- President of the Maldives
  - List of presidents of the Maldives

== Notes ==
- Regnal names are in ancient Maldive language. The names are followed with "Maha Radun" for Kings and "Maha Rehendi" for Queens.
- When there were no coronation ceremony, they were called "Keerithi Maha Radun" for kings and "Keerithi Maha Rehendi" for queens.
