= Sultan Hassan =

Sultan (/ˈsʌltən/; Arabic: سلطان sulṭān, pronounced [sʊlˈtˤɑːn, solˈtˤɑːn]) is a position with several historical meanings. Sultan Hassan may refer to:

- Sultan an-Nasir Hasan, Mamluk sultan of Egypt (1347–1351, 1355–1361) and namesake of the Mosque-Madrasa of Sultan Hasan and Sultan Hassan Secondary School
- Sultan Hassan Farah, the 3rd Grand Sultan of the Isaaq Sultanate (1845–1870) and the father of Deria Hassan
- Sultan Hassan I of Morocco, Sultan of Morocco (1873–1894). King Mohammed V of Morocco (1927–1961), changed title of ruler from Sultan to King in 1957
- Sultan Hassan I of the Maldives, Sultan of the Maldives (1388–1398)
- Sultan Hassan II of the Maldives, Sultan of the Maldives
- Sultan Hassan III of the Maldives, Sultan of the Maldives (1443–1467)
- Sultan Hassan IV of the Maldives, Sultan of the Maldives (1480–1481)
- Sultan Hassan V of the Maldives, Sultan of the Maldives (1484–1485)
- Sultan Hassan Nooraddeen I, Sultan of the Maldives (1779–1799)
- Sultan Hassan Nooraddeen II, Sultan of the Maldives (1935–1943)
- Sultan Faiz-ul Hassan Shah, Pakistani Islamic scholar (1911–1984)
- Sultan Hassan (astrophysicist), contemporary Sudanese computational astrophysicist.
