= Valla Dio of the Maldives =

Al-Sultan Valla Dio Kalaminjaa Siri Raa-Araa Desvaru Mahaa Radun (Dhivehi: އައްސުލްޠާން ވައްލާ ދިއޯ ކަލަމިންޖާ ސިރީ ރާއަރާދޭސްވަރު މަހާރަދުން) was a Sultan of the Maldives. He was younger brother to Sultan Wadi, Dhinei and Dhihei. He ruled the country from 1233 to 1258.

Preceded by Wadi	Sultan of the Maldives; 1233–1258	Succeeded by Hudhei
