= Mohammed IV =

Mohammed IV may refer to:

- Mehmed IV Giray (1610–1674), khan of the Crimean Khanate
- Mehmed IV (1642–1693), Ottoman sultan
- Mohammed IV of Morocco (1802–1873), sultan
- Muhammad IV al-Hadi (1855–1906), ruler of Tunisia

== See also ==
- Muhammad Imaaduddeen IV (died 1882), sultan of the Maldives
