= Muthey of the Maldives =

Sultan of the Maldives, r. 1175–1184

Muthey
- Muthey Kalaminja

Sultan of the Maldives
- Reign: 1175 – 1184
- Predecessor: Dhovemi
- Successor: Ali I
Regnal name
- Al-Sultan Muthey Kalaminja Siri Bavana Abaarana Mahaa Radun
- House: Theemuge
- Mother: Mulee Maavaa Kilege ( Sister of Koimala )

Al-Sultan Muthey Kalaminja Siri Bavana Abaarana Mahaa Radun (Dhivehi: އައްސުލްޠާން މުތެއި ކަލަމިންޖާ ސިރީ ބަވަނަ އަބާރަނަ މަހާ ރަދުން) was the Sultan of the Maldives from 1175 to 1184. He was the son of Mulee Maavaa Kilege (Dhivehi: މުލީމާވާކިލެގެ), the maternal aunt of Sultan Dhovemi and sister of King Koimala. He ruled for 9 years (According to Loamaafaanu) and was succeeded by Ali I also of the Theemuge Dynasty of Maldivian sultans.

Preceded by Dhovemi	Sultan of the Maldives; 1175–1184	Succeeded by Ali I
