= Vagaaru =

Coordinates: 7°05′35″N 72°52′42″E

Vagaaru is one of the uninhabited islands of Haa Alif Atoll and geographically part of Thiladhummathi Atoll in the north of the Maldives. The island was previously inhabited and abandoned only during the reign of Sultan Hassan Nooraddeen I for unknown reasons.
