= Danna Mohamed of the Maldives =

Sultan Danna Mohammed Sri Raadha Bavana Mahaa Radun was the Sultan of Maldives in 1421. He was the son of Prince Yoosuf Abbas Hadheygirin, and a member of the Hilaalee dynasty. This Sultan ruled the country for only 11 months until he was forced to abdicate by Prince Yoosuf (later Sultan Yoosuf).

In his reign he built many places such as Henveyru Danna Muhammed Mosque, Maafannu Bandaara Mosque and the Kanbaafaanu Royal Palace (now Maavaage).

He served as Prime Minister to Osman I and was the paternal uncle of Hassan I and Hussain I.
