= Izzuddin of the Maldives =

Izzuddin

King of the Maldive Islands
- Reign: 5 December 1759 – 1 February 1767
- Coronation: 5 December 1759
- Predecessor: Amina II
- Successor: Mohamed Giyasuddin

Regent of the Maldives
- Regency: 17 November 1754 – 5 December 1759
- Monarch: Imaduddin III (1754–1757); Amina II (1757–1759)
- Born: Hassan Izzuddin; 14 April 1720; Malé, Maldive Islands
- Died: 1 February 1767 (aged 46); Malé, Maldive Islands
- Burial: Malé Friday Mosque
- Spouse: Aminafaan
- Issue: Muizzuddin I; Prince Ibrahim Manikfaan; Hassan Nooraddeen I
Regnal name
- Sri Kula Ranmeeba Kattiri bavana Maharadun
- Dynasty: Huraa
- Father: Mohamed Famuladeri Kilegefan
- Mother: Aminafan
- Religion: Islam

Izzuddin (Hassan Izzuddin; 14 April 1720 – 1 February 1767), commonly known as Dhon Bandaarain, was the King of the Maldives from December 1759 until his death in February 1767.

== Ali Raja's invasion in 1763 ==
In the Malabar Coast Ali Raja Kunhi Amsa II had established a large and well armed fleet of Ketch's in the Indian Ocean, in his attempts to conquer islands that had withstood the Mughal Emperor Aurangzeb. The embarking fleet from Lakshadweep and Cannanore carried on board Sepoys and on its pennons the colors and emblems of Hyder Ali, captured the Maldives and enacted cruelties upon fellow Muslim's who inhabited the islands.

Soon, Ali Raja Kunhi Amsa II returned to Mysore and its port of Bangalore and arrived at Nagar in order to pay homage to Hyder Ali, who panicked in outrage when Ali Raja Kunhi Amsa II presented him the blinded and unfortunate Sultan of the Maldives Mukkaram Muhammad Imadu-din III. Hyder Ali ordered the deposition of the insane Ali Raja Kunhi Amsa II from the command of his fleet and begged forgiveness from Hasan 'Izz ud-din for the outrage committed by his guilty admiral. Hyder Ali was deeply afflicted by that event and after respectfully escorting and returning Hasan 'Izz ud-din to the Maldives, he withdrew from the palaces and sought solace in simplicity and hardly entrusted anyone whom he had given power and authority.

== See also ==
- Sultanate of Mysore
- Hyder Ali
- Arakkal kingdom

Preceded by Sultan Mukarram Muhammad Imaduddin III and Amina of the Maldives	Sultan of the Maldives; 1759 – 1766	Succeeded by Sultan Al-Haj Muhammed Ghiya'as ud-din Iskandar Sri Kula Sundara Maha Radun
