= Davud of the Maldives =

Al-Sultan Davud Siri Sundhura Bavana Maha Radun (Dhivehi: އައްސުލްޠާން ދާވޫދު ކަލަމިންޖާ ސިރީ ސުންދުރަ ބަވަނަ މަހާރަދުން) was the Sultan of the Maldives from 1301 to 1306. He was a son of Sultan Yoosuf I and succeeded his brother to the throne. Sultan Davud was the 16th sultan to ascend the throne from the Theemuge dynasty.

Preceded by Salis	Sultan of the Maldives; 1302–1307	Succeeded by Omar I
