= Keimi of the Maldives =

Sultan of Maldives, 1268 to 1269

Al-Sultan Keimi Kalaminjaa Siri Madheenee Suvara Maha Radun (Dhivehi: އައްސުލްޠާން ކެއިމި ކަލަމިންޖާ ސިރީ މަދީނީ ސުވަރަ މަހާރަދުން) was the Sultan of Maldives from 1268 to 1269. He was the 12 sultan to ascend the throne of Maldives from the Lunar dynasty. He was also the sons of Aidage Maavaa Kilege (Dhivehi: އައިދަގެ މާވާކިލެގެ) daughter of Fathahiriya Maavaa Kilege (Dhivehi: ފަތަހިރިޔާ މާވާކިލެގެ).

Preceded by Hali I	Sultan of the Maldives; 1268–1269	Succeeded by Audha
