= Hudhei of the Maldives =

13th-century Sultan of the Maldives

Al-Sultan Hudhei Kalaminjaa Siri Raadha Suvara Mahaa Radun (Dhivehi: އައްސުލްޠާން ހުދެއި ކަލަމިންޖާ ސިރީ ރާދަސުވަރަ މަހާރަދުން) or Al-Sultan Hudhei Kalaminjaa Siri Veeru Abaarana Mahaa Radun (Dhivehi: އައްސުލްޠާން ހުދެއި ކަލަމިންޖާ ސިރީ ވީރު އަބާރަނަ މަހާރަދުން), was the Sultan of the Maldives from 1258 to 1264. He belonged to the Lunar Dynasty and was the son of Hiriya Maavaa Kilege (Dhivehi: ހިރިޔާ މާވާކިލެގެ). He ruled the country for 6 years.

Preceded by Valla Dio	Sultan of the Maldives; 1258–1264	Succeeded by Aima
