= Ibrahim I of the Maldives =

Sultan of the Maldives (r. 1398, 1412–1420)

Sultan Ibrahim, Sri dhanmaru Veeru Mahaa radhun was Sultan of the Maldives briefly in 1398 and again from 1412 to 1420. He was the eldest son of Sultan Hassan I of the Maldives. He ruled the country for four months in 1398 before abdicating in favour of his uncle Hussain.

After the death of Sultan Isa in 1412, Ibrahim regained the throne and ruled the country for 8 years and 8 months until his death in 1420.

== See also ==
- List of Maldivian monarchs

Preceded by Hassan I of the Maldives	Sultan of the Maldives; 1398-1398	Succeeded by Hussain I of the Maldives
Preceded by Isa of the Maldives	Sultan of the Maldives; 1412-1420	Succeeded by Osman II of the Maldives
