= Omar I of the Maldives =

Sultan of the Maldives from 1306 to 1341

Al-Sultan Abul Fath Jalaaluddin Omar Veeru Siri Abaarana Mahaa Radun (Dhivehi: އައްސުލްޠާން އަބުލް ފަތްޙު ޖަލާލުއްދީން ޢުމަރު ވީރު ސިރީ އަބާރަނަ މަހާރަދުން) was the Sultan of the Maldives from 1306 to 1341. He was the son of Sultan Salis. According to Moroccan traveller Ibn Battuta, his father was a Bengali and the founder of a new dynasty. Sultan Omar I ruled the country for 35 years until his death in 1341. He had a son named Ahmed Shihaabuddheen and two daughters Khadhijah and Raadhafathi, all of whom later became rulers of the Maldives. He was succeeded by his son Ahmed Shihaabuddheen.

Preceded by Davud	Sultan of the Maldives; 1306–1341	Succeeded by Ahmed Shihabuddine
