= Hali I of the Maldives =

Sultan

Al-Sultan Hali Kalaminjaa I Siri Singaa Abaarana Maha Radun (Dhivehi: އައްސުލްޠާން ހަލީ ކަލަމިންޖާ އެއްވަނަ ސިރީ ސިންގާ އަބާރަނަ މަހާރަދުން) or Al-Sultan Ali II Siri Singaa Abaarana Mahaa Radun (Dhivehi: އައްސުލްޠާން ޢަލީ ކަލަމިންޖާ ދެވަނަ ސިރީ ސިންގާ އަބާރަނަ މަހާރަދުން) was the Sultan of Maldives from 1266 to 1268. He was the 11th sultan to ascend the throne of Maldives from the Lunar dynasty. His father was Vengeheli Kalo (Dhivehi: ވެންގެހެލީ ކަލޯ) of Kendhoo and his mother was Aidage Maavaa Kilege (Dhivehi: އައިދަގެ މާވާކިލެގެ) daughter of Fathahiriya Maavaa Kilege (Dhivehi: ފަތަހިރިޔާ މާވާކިލެގެ). He reigned for 1 year and six months.

Preceded by Aima	Sultan of the Maldives; 1266–1268	Succeeded by Keimi
