= Aima of the Maldives =

Al-Sultan Aima Kalaminjaa Siri Loka Suvara Mahaa Radun (Dhivehi: އައްސުލްޠާން އައިމަ ކަލަމިންޖާ ސިރީ ލޯކަ ސުވަރަ މަހާރަދުން) was the Sultan of Maldives from 1264 to 1266. His father was Volumidi Bodu Kilege (Dhivehi: ވޮލުމިދި ބޮޑުކިލޭގެ) of Fehendu and his mother was Bulhaa (lit. Cat) Kabaaidhi Kilege (Dhivehi: ބުޅާ ކަނބައިދި ކިލޭގެ) or Hirirashu Kabaaidhi Kilege (Dhivehi: ހިރިރަށު ކަނބައިދި ކިލޭގެ). He belonged to the Lunar Dynasty and ruled for two years until his death in 1266.

Preceded by Hudhei	Sultan of the Maldives; 1264–1266	Succeeded by Hali I
