= Kuda Kala Kamanafaanu =

- Lady of twelve thousand isles, the Sultana of the Maldives
- Reign: 1609–1613 or 1607–1609
- Predecessor: Ibrahim Kalaafaan (Sultan Ibrahim III)
- Successor: Hussain Faamuladeyri Kilege (Sultan Hussain II)
- Died: 1613

Kuda Kala Kamanafaanu, also known as Kalhu Kamana or Queen Tukkamana, was the de facto Sultana regnant of the Maldives, but legally the regent of King Dom Philippe who resided in Goa.

From the death of Kalaafaan in 1609, Kalaafaan's cousin Queen Tukkamana ruled for up to four years until her death.

She was not able to secure her rule due to a civil war. She died during a pilgrimage at the Mahibadu island in the Ari Atoll.

The grant, written in 1661, gives the name of her.

Preceded by Ibrahim Kalaafaan	Sultan of the Maldives; 1609–1613	Succeeded by Hussain Faamuladeyri Kilege
