= Muhammad Shamsuddeen II =

Sultan of the Maldives

Sultan Muhammad Shams ud-deen Iskandar II (Arabic: محمد شمس الدين اسكندر الثاني; Dhivehi: މުހައްމަދު ޝަމްސުއްދީން އިސްކަންދަރު ދެވަނަ އެވެ), was the Sultan of the Maldives in 1774. His father was Husain Bodu Dorimena Kilegefan. He abdicated in 1774 and was succeeded by Muhammad Mu'iz ud-din. He started building the Kalhuvakaru Mosque in 1774.

Preceded by Muhammed Ghiya'as ud-din	Sultan of the Maldives; 1773–1774	Succeeded by Muhammad Mu'iz ud-din
