= Burecca of the Maldives =

Burecca of the Maldives or Buraki Rani (fl. 1513–29), was a queen consort of the Maldives. She crowned her spouse Kalu Mohamed as king. She herself took the title rani instead of the title Rehendi or sultana, which was normally worn by female monarchs, signifying that she was queen consort rather than a monarch and ruler herself.

== Life ==
Buraki was the sister of the future Ali V. She was known for her skill in martial arts as a child, and outshone her younger brother and sister and was expected to succeed her grandfather, sultan Siri Bavana Sooja. Instead, her younger brother Dombula Farina Kilige was made sultan in 1513 under the name Siri Ananda Sultan Ali V.

=== Exile ===
Her cousin Raddeba Magu Kalu Muhammad Manikufani (Kalhu Muhammad a.k.a. Sultan Muhammad the Black) wished to marry her. He was the son of her aunt, the younger sister of Sultan Abu Bakr. The marriage was opposed by his mother, who exiled him to Vaadhoo Island in Huvadu Atoll. When he was to leave, Ali V allowed his sister Buraki to follow him in exile in the company of their childhood servant, Kalu Ibrahim of Gafaru island, the stepson of Huludeli Don Yusuf, the Sultan's sword-bearer.

=== Queen ===
Instead of the Huvadu Atoll, however, Buraki and Kalu Ibrahim left for Goa, where they promised a share of the Maldive revenues to the Portuguese if they assisted her in deposing her brother. According to legend, she trained in martial arts to be able to defeat her brother upon her return. Buraki was then escorted by a Portuguese armed vessel to Gaafaru Island. From there, she had Kalu Ibrahim sent to Malé to assassinate her brother. With the help of his stepfather, Kali Ibrahim succeeded in convincing the sultan into leaving the Palace, after which he was attacked, hamstrung and left to die. Legend claim that Buraki herself returned to Male during the night and killed her brother in a duel in the palace square lasting several hours. In any event, Buraki herself took power after the death of her brother. However, it is not said that she took the throne herself. Instead, she recalled Kalu Muhammad from exile, married him and placed him upon the throne. She took the title rani(Queen Consort) instead of the rehendi or sultana, which was normally worn by female monarchs.

According to another version of the tale, after her brother was crowned, she fled the Maldives and travelled east to the Sultanate of Aceh (known to the Maldivians as Asey Cara) on the island of Sumatra. There she completed her education and perfected her martial arts before returning home to depose her brother. Her fleet entered Malé harbour in the dead of night. Burecca/Buraki fought a duel with her brother on the square inside the royal palace complex, several hours before dawn that morning. She slew her brother King Siri Ananda and ascended the throne to rule jointly with her husband King Siri Dhammaru Bavana (Sultan Mohamed the Black). It is also said that this was his third accession to the throne. Buraki Rani and her spouse, King Siri Dhammaru Bavana ruled together from 1513 to 1529. The marriage was not happy and eventually, her spouse banished her to Thiladhunmathi Atoll and married Shirazi Fatuma, who became the mother of Hassan VIII, who succeeded to the throne in 1529.
