= Ali I of the Maldives =

Al-Sultan Ali Kalaminja Siri Dhammaru Naaja Mahaa Radun (Dhivehi: އައްސުލްޠާން ޢަލީ ކަލަމިންޖާ އެއްވަނަ ސިރީ ދަންމަރުނާޖަ މަހާރަދުން) was the Sultan of the Maldives from 1184 to 1192. He was the son of Rekehiriyaa Maavaa Kilege (Dhivehi: ރެކެހިރިޔާ މާވާކިލެގެ). Sultan Ali I was succeeded by Dhinei

Preceded by Muthey	Sultan of the Maldives; 1184–1192	Succeeded by Dhinei
