= Osman II of the Maldives =

Osman II
- Sultan of the Maldives
- Predecessor: Ibrahim I of the Maldives
- Father: Hassan I of the Maldives
- Religion: Islam

Osman II was the Sultan of Maldives from 1420 to 1421. He was the son of Sultan Hassan I and also brother of Sultan Ibrahim I. Sultan Osman was famous for his kindness to his subjects. He was also a devout Muslim who spent his time reading the Quran and had also completed the Hajj.
