= Dhihei of the Maldives =

Al-Sultan Dhihei Kalaminjaa II Siri Dhagatha Abaarana Mahaaradhun (Dhivehi: އައްސުލްޠާން ދިހެއި ކަލަމިންޖާ ސިރީ ދަގަތާ އަބާރަނަ މަހާރަދުން) was the Sultan of the Maldives from 1199 to 1214. He ascended the throne after the death of his elder brother Dhinei in 1199. He was the sixth sultan to ascend the throne of Maldives from the Lunar dynasty. He ruled for 15 years.

Preceded by Dhinei	Sultan of the Maldives; 1199–1214	Succeeded by Wadi
