= Amina Rani Kilegefaanu =

Aminath Rani Kilegefan
- Sultana of Land and Sea; Lady of the Twelve-Thousand Islands; Sultana of the Maldives
- Reign: 1754–1757 (as regent); 1757–1759 (as monarch)
- Predecessor: Amina I of Maldives
- Successor: Hasan 'Izz ud-din
- Born: circa 1745
- Died: after 1759
Regnal name
- Amina II of the Maldives
- House: Dhiyamigili
- Father: Muhammad Imaduddin III

Amina Rani Kilegefaanu or Aminath Rani Kilegefan (born c. 1745 – died after 1759) was the princess regent of the Maldives in the absence of her father Muhammad Imaduddin III in 1754–1757, and Sultana regnant in 1757–1759.

== Life ==
Amina was the daughter of Sultan Muhammad Imaduddin III. In 1752, her father was taken captive by Ali Raja of Cannanore and imprisoned in Kavaratti island in the Laccadives, and Malé was occupied by the Malabars of Cannanore. After 17 weeks of occupation, Malé was freed from the Malabars by Muleegey Dom Hassan Maniku, also called Hassan Manikfan. Her adult paternal as well as maternal cousin, Amina I, was placed on the throne as regent, with Hassan Manikfan as de facto co-regent.

=== Reign ===
In 1754, her cousin Amina I abdicated, and Amina II was named nominal princess regent for her absent father at the age of nine, with Hassan Manikfan as de facto co-regent. When her absent father Muhammad Imaduddin III died in 1757, Amina II succeed him as monarch and was proclaimed queen and Sultana of the Maldives with Hassan Manikfan as her regent. She was about twelve years old at her succession.

In 1759, Queen Amina was deposed in favor of her paternal uncle Hasan 'Izz ud-din. Her successor was described as kind to his royal relatives, and Amina reportedly "received great respect" by him.

Preceded by Amina I	Sultan of the Maldives; 1757–1759	Succeeded by Hasan 'Izz ud-din
