= Wadi of the Maldives =

Al-Sultan Wadi Kalaminjaa Siri Dhagatha Suvara Mahaa Radun (Dhivehi: އައްސުލޠާން ވަޑީ ކަލަމިންޖާ ސިރީ ދަގަތާ ސުވަރަ މަހާ ރަދުން) was the Sultan of the Maldives between 1214 and 1233. He was also one of the sons of Fathahiriyaa Maavaa Kilege (Dhivehi: ފަތަހިރިޔާ މާވާކިލެގެ). Sultan Wadi ascended the throne in 1214 after the death of his elder brother Sultan Dhihei. He was succeeded by his younger brother Valla Dio.

Preceded by Dhihei	Sultan of the Maldives; 1214–1233	Succeeded by Valla Dio
