= Khadijah of the Maldives =

Lady of twelve thousand isles

- Lady of twelve thousand isles, the Sultana of the Maldives

Monarch of the Maldives (1st reign)
- Reign: 1347–1362 or 1347–1363
- Predecessor: Ahmed Shihabuddine (1340–1347)
- Successor: Mohamed el-Jameel

Monarch of the Maldives (2nd reign)
- Reign: 1363–1373 or 1364–1374
- Predecessor: Mohamed el-Jameel (1362–1363)
- Successor: Abdullah I

Monarch of the Maldives (3rd reign)
- Reign: 1376–1379 or 1376–1380
- Predecessor: Abdullah I (1373–1376)
- Successor: Raadhafathi
- Died: 1379 or 1380
- Burial: Kōgaṇṇu
- Spouse: Mohamed el-Jameel (died 1363); Abdullah I (died 1376)
- House: House of Theemuge
- Father: Omar I of the Maldives

Al-Sultana Khadeejah Sri Raadha Abaarana Mahaa Rehendhi (Dhivehi: އައްސުލްޠާނާ ޚަދީޖާ ސިރީ ރާދަ އަބާރަނަ މަހާރެހެންދި; died 1379 or 1380) or more famously known as just Rehendhi Khadeejah (Dhivehi: ރެހެންދި ޚަދީޖާ) was the Sultana regnant of the Maldives from 1347 to 1379.

Khadeeja was the eldest daughter of Omar I of the Maldives. After the death of her father Sultan Omar, his son Ahmed Shihabuddine ascended the throne as Ahmed Shihabuddine of the Maldives. Khadija had her brother, the Sultan Ahmed Shihabuddine assassinated and took the throne for herself in 1347, becoming the first female ruler of Theemuge Dynasty.

The army of the Sultana of Maldives consisted of a thousand men of foreign birth; some of them natives. They attended to the hall of audience every day to salute her.

== Biography ==
=== First reign ===
Khadijah was the eldest daughter of Sultan Omar I of the Maldives. According to Moroccan traveller Ibn Battuta, her Bengali grandfather, Sultan Salahuddin Salih al-Bangali, was the founder of the dynasty. She was also half-sister of Raadhafathi who succeeded her after her (Khadijah's) final reign. Her first accession to the throne was in 1347 after deposing her own brother, Sultan Ahmed Shihabuddine, which lasted until 1362.

Ibn Battuta: "One of the wonders of these islands is that its ruler (sultana) is a woman named Khadija ... . Sovereignty was exercised first by her grandfather, and then by her father. When the latter died her brother Shihab-ud-din became king. He was still young and the vezir 'Abdallah son of Muhammad al-Hazrami married the mother of Shihab-uddin and overpowered him. And it was he who married also this Sultana Khadija after the death of her husband, the vezir Jamal-uddin." He then confirms the power struggles which resulted in the death of her brother and her enthronement: "The only survivors from the ruling house were his three sisters ... . The inhabitants of the Maldive islands preferred for sovereign Khadija and she was the wife of their orator (khatib) Jamal-ud-din who became vezir. He took over the reins of power . . . but orders were issued in the name of Khadija only. The orders were written on palm leaves with a bent piece of iron similar to a knife, while paper was not used except for writing the Qur'an and books of learning."

According to Ibn Battuta:

"The orator (khatib) mentioned the queen (sultana) in the Friday prayer and also on other occasions. 'O my God!' says he, 'help Thy female slave whom Thou in Thy wisdom hast chosen from all creatures and made an instrument of Thy grace for all Muslims."

Ibn Battuta described that the women in the Maldives did not cover their bodies waist up as other Muslim women, neither did queen Khadija, and that his efforts to make them do so failed.

=== Second reign ===
In 1363 or 1362 she was deposed by her vizier and husband Muhammad el-Jameel. However 1363 she came to the throne once more after deposing and assassinating her first husband. Her second reign lasted from 1363 to 1373 until she was deposed again, by her second husband and minister Abdullah I.

=== Third reign ===
In the third year after her deposition, she assassinated and deposed her second husband Abdullah I in 1376. Hence her third and final reign began in 1376 which lasted until 1379. Despite being deposed twice by her husbands she ruled the country for nearly 30 years. She was succeeded by Raadhafathi.

== Succession ==
Preceded by Ahmed Shihabuddine	Sultana of the Maldives; 1347–1362	Succeeded by Mohamed el-Jameel
Preceded by Mohamed el-Jameel	Sultana of the Maldives; 1363–1373	Succeeded by Abdullah I
Preceded by Abdullah I	Sultana of the Maldives; 1376–1379	Succeeded by Raadhafathi
