= Salis of the Maldives =

Al-Sultan Salis Kalaminjaa Siri Meesuvara Mahaa Radun (Dhivehi: އައްސުލްޠާން ސަލިސް ކަލަމިންޖާ ސިރީ މީސުވަރަ މަހާރަދުން), also known as as-Sulṭān Ṣalāḥ ad-Dīn Ṣāliḥ al-Bangālī was the Sultan of Maldives from 1293 to 1302. He succeeded to the throne after the death of his father Sultan Yoosuf I, by becoming the 15th sultan to ascend the throne of Maldives from the Lunar dynasty. However, according to Moroccan traveller Ibn Battuta, he was not the son of Yoosuf, but rather was a Bengali who had founded a new dynasty.

Preceded by Yoosuf I	Sultan of the Maldives; 1293–1302	Succeeded by Davud
