= Dhovemi of the Maldives =

Dhovemi
- Dharumavantha Rasgefaanu

King of the Kingdom of Dheeva Maari
- Reign: 1142 – 1153
- Predecessor: Koimala
- Successor: Himself as Sultan

Sultan of the Sultanate of Maldives
- Reign: 1153 – 1175
- Predecessor: Himself as King
- Successor: Muthey
- Born: 12th century Malé, Maldives
- Died: 1176; Salalah, Imamate of Oman
Regnal name
- Dhovemi Kalaminja Siri Thiribuvana-aadiththa Maha Radun
- House: Theemuge
- Mother: Henevi Maavaa Kilage (sister of Koimala)
- Religion: Sunni Islam prev. Theravada Buddhism

Dhovemi Kalaminja Siri Thiribuvana-aadiththa Maha Radun (Dhivehi: ދޮވެމި ކަލަމިންޖާ ސިރީ ތިރިބުވަނަ އާދީއްތަ މަހާ ރަދުން) or Donei Kalaminjaa (Dhivehi: ދޮނެއި ކަލަމިންޖާ) was the second king of the Maldives from 1142 to 1165 or 1175 according to the Raadhavalhi and the Loamaafaanu copper plate writings (two sources from which the early history of the Maldives is studied). The Tarikh chronicles however, calls this king Sultan Muhammad al-Adil which is probably the Muslim name of the king after his conversion to Islam in the 12th year of his reign. Later on the title of Dharumavantha Rasgefaanu (Dhivehi: ދަރުމަވަންތަ ރަސްގެފާނު) or the Benevolent King was bestowed upon him.

He is also known as the first ruler of the Theemuge Dynasty (not considering King Koimala of the Lunar Dynasty). This name was derived from his house's name, Theemuge, some sourced refer to the royal house as the Maalei Dharikolhu. Though it was being called Theemuge Darikolhu they were descendants of the Buddhist Kings of the Lunar Dynasty or Soma Vansa.

Dhovemi was the son of Henevi Maavaa Kilage (Dhivehi: ހެނެވި މާވާ ކިލެގެ) the sister of the first King Koimala of all the Maldives. He ruled for 35 years, 12 years as a Buddhist and 23 years after his conversion to Islam.

== The Conversion of Maldives to Islam ==
The Dharumavantha Miskyii in Malé, the Mosque built by and named after its first Muslim King in the 1150s

The conversion of Dhovemi, and later the whole Maldivian Kingdom to Islam was accredited by Ibn Batuta, after visiting the Kingdom and staying there for some time, to Abu al-Barakat Yusuf al-Barbari from Morocco. Later sources claim that a Persian from the Tabriz, called Yusuf Tabrizi was responsible for the conversion of the Maldivian Kingdom to Islam in the year 1153. The newly converted king became the first sultan of the Maldives. The governance of the country is said to have been carried out by the king as advised by Yusuf Tabrizi. King Dhovemi sent emissaries to the different atolls to convert all the inhabitants of the Maldives without any exception to the Muslim faith. The king himself sailed to the island of Nilandhoo in North Nilande Atoll and converted the inhabitants there to Islam. He is also said to have built a mosque there. The conversion of the whole country is said to have taken place on the 2nd day of Rabi'-ul-Akhir 548 AH (1153 AD) on the 17th year of Al-Muqtafi, the Caliph of Baghdad, and since then the Maldives has been a predominantly Islamic country. By the order of the king as his brother Siri Kalo, the first Friday mosque of Malé was built by Al-Wazir Shanivirazaa. The Dharumavantha Miskyii—the oldest mosque in Malé—is said to have been built by King Dhovemi.

Sultan Dhovemi was the first to enforce Islamic law in the Maldives. According to legend, all traces of idolatry were razed during this period of major transformation of the Maldives and mosques were built on many of the inhabited islands.

== Death ==
The death of the Sultan is not recorded, but he is said to have disappeared in 1175 on a voyage to Mecca to perform the Hajj. The Taarikh writes as revived from the Isdhoo loamaafanu:

"(he said) next Friday a ship will arrive, whereon I shall sail for Makkah. The day named verily a vessel anchored at Malé. The Sultan, having performed the Jumu'ah (Friday-noon prayers) at the mosque, hurried to the seashore and embarked in the vessel without attendants or provisions. Forthwith the ship passed from sight as suddenly as lightning (and he was not heard from thence)"

On the disappearance of his uncle, Muthey Kalaminja took over the throne of the Maldives and ruled as the sultan from 1165 according to the Raadhavalhi. The Isdhoo (1195–1196) and Dhan'bidhoo (1196–1197) Loamaafaanus (copper plates) give the date as 1175.

According to Maldivian historians Mohamed Ibrahim Lutfy and Mohamed Waheed Nadwi, the king learned that a sur nav (a ship which is belonged to Sur of Oman) arrived on its way to Oman completing its journey from the Malay archipelago. He went to Sur by that ship and after completion of his pilgrimage, he got ill on the way back and died and was buried in Salalah, Oman.

Regnal titles
Preceded by Koimala	King of the Maldives; 1142–1153	Succeeded by —
Preceded by —	Sultan of the Maldives; 1153–1175	Succeeded by Muthey
