= Aboobakuru I of the Maldives =

Sultan of the Maldives

Sultan Aboobakar I Sri Bavana Sooja Mahaa Radun was the sultan of Maldives for 20 years. He was the 11th sultan to ascend the throne of Maldives from Hilaaly Dynasty. He was the son of Hilaaly Hassan I of the Maldives. King Aboobkar succeeded his brother to the throne. He married Kolhumadulu Atoll Kandoodhoo Reki rani kamanaa faan. He was killed in battle with the Portuguese who came to the Maldives to summon the Council of Ministers of the Maldives to Cochin.
