= Abdullah I of the Maldives =

Sultan of the Maldives from 1374 to 1376

Al-Sultan Abdullah I Sri Dhanmaru Aadheettha Mahaa Radhun (Dhivehi: އައްސުލްޠާން ޢަބްދުﷲ އެއްވަނަ ސިރީ ދަންމަރު އާދީއްތަ މަހާރަދުން) was the prince consort turned Sultan of the Maldives in 1373–1376 or 1374–1376.

He was vizier to the court before forcing his wife queen Khadijah to abdicate, and succeeding to the throne. In his third year of reign his wife killed him while he was asleep in bed and reclaimed the throne once again.

Preceded by Khadijah	Sultan of the Maldives; 1374–1376	Succeeded by Khadijah
