= Muhammad Mueenuddeen I =

Sultan of the Maldives

Muhammad Mueenuddeen I (Arabic: محمد معين الدين الأول; Dhivehi: މުޙައްމަދު މުޢީނުއްދީން އައި), was the sultan of the Maldives from 1798 to 1835. He ruled for 37 years, 1 month and 4 days.

Preceded by Hassan Nooraddeen I	Sultan of the Maldives; 1798–1835	Succeeded by Muhammad Imaaduddeen IV
