= Mohamed el-Jameel of the Maldives =

Sultan Mohamed el-Jameel Sri Bavana Sooja Mahaa Radun (Dhivehi: އައްސުލޠާން މުޙައްމަދުލް ޖަމީލް ސިރީ ބަވަނަ ސޫޖާ މަހާރަދުން) was the prince consort turned Sultan of the Maldives in 1362–1363 or 1363–1364.

He ascended the throne in 1363 by forcing his wife (Queen Khadijah) to abdicate. Before his succession he was the vizier of his wife. Sultan Jameel was assassinated by his wife in 1364 to regain her throne.

Preceded by Khadijah of the Maldives	Sultan of the Maldives; 1363–1364	Succeeded by Khadijah of the Maldives
