= Ibrahim Iskandar I =

Sultan of the Maldives

Sultan Ibrahim Iskandhar Siri kularanmeeba Kathiri Bavana Mahaa Radun (c. 1630 – 1687) was the sultan of Maldives from 1648 to 1687. He was the son of HH Sultan Muhammad Imaduddin I and Kabaa Aisha. Iskandar ascended to the throne of Maldives at age 18, after the death of his father. During his reign, he rebuilt the Malé Hukuru Miskiy in Malé and began educating his people by teaching the Qur'an. Iskandar died in 1687 after ruling nearly for 40 years. He was succeeded by his son Kuda Muhammad under the regency of his consort Mariyam Kaba'afa'anu Rani Kilege.

== Letters to the Mughal Empire ==
The Sultan of the Maldives Ibrahim Iskandar I, was alarmed by the trading activities of the English East India Company and the Dutch East India Company in the Indian Ocean and by their growing interest in cowries and caires (coconut fibre). In the year 1660, Iskandar requested the assistance of the Mughal Faujdar of Balasore, and even wrote a letter persuading the Mughal Emperor Aurangzeb to prohibit the English East India Company and the Dutch East India Company to sail on profitable routes by the Indian coasts. The Maldives however was not directly subjected to the rule of the Mughal Empire.

== Currency of Maldives ==
Loa laari or laari fothi ("circular coin") was first struck by Sultan Ibrahim Iskandar I during his regency from 1648-1687 CE. One of the known coins is the 1 laari coin made during 1660-1666 (Islamic calendar: 1070-1074 ) the coin weighs about 4.80 grams and is made from silver. On the obverse side of the coin the Sultan name, mint and date is written. Lettering:١٠٧٠ المحلى سنه اسكندرضرب في Translation: Iskandar Struck in Male 1070. On the reverse side of the coin the Sultan title is written. Lettering: السلطان البر والبحر Translation: Sultan of the Land and Sea. Another known coin made during his regency, a 1 laari coin made in 1685-1686 ( Islamic calendar: 1096-1097 ) weighs 4.80 grams and is made from silver. On the obverse side, the Sultan name and mint is written. The same inscription in Arabic as that of the first coin. And on the reverse side of the coin, the Sultan name, title and date is written.
