= Ahmed Shihabuddin of the Maldives =

Sultan of Maldives from 1341 to 1347

Al-Sultan Ahmed Shihabuddin Sri Loka Adheehtha Mahaa Radun (Dhivehi: އައްސުލްޠާން އަޙްމަދު ޝިހާބުއްދީން ސިރީ ލޯކަ އާދީއްތަ މަހާރަދުން) was the Sultan of Maldives from 1341 to 1347. He succeeded his father to the throne and ruled until his deposition by his sister, Queen Khadijah. After his deposition, he was banished to Haddhunmathi Atoll and was assassinated while he was there.

Preceded by Omar I	Sultan of the Maldives; 1341–1347	Succeeded by Khadijah
