= Omar II of the Maldives =

Sultan Omar II Sri loaka Sundhura Mahaa Radhun was the sultan of the Maldives from 1480 to 1484. He was the Son of Sultan Yoosuf II Lord of twelve Thousand Isles and the Sultan of Maldives. Sultan Omar was the seventeenth Sultan to ascend the lion throne of Maldives from the Dynasty of Hilaaly. He died in 1484 in Malé, the capital of Maldives, after ruling the country for four years. He is buried in Hukuru mosque cemetery (the royal cemetery).

== See also ==
- List of Maldivian monarchs
