= Koimala =

- Koimala Kalo

King of the Kingdom of Dheeva Maari
- Reign: 1117 – 1141
- Predecessor: King Siri Bovana Aananda
- Successor: Dhovemi Kalaminja
Regnal name
- Koimala Siri Mahaabarana Mahaa Radun
- House: Theemuge
- Father: King Siri Bovana Aananda

Koimala Siri Mahaabarana Mahaa Radun (Dhivehi: ކޮއިމަލާ ސިރީ މަހާބަރަނަ މަހާ ރަދުން) or Koimala (Dhivehi: ކޮއިމަލާ, lit. 'flower lad') or Koimala Kalo (Dhivehi: ކޮއިމަލާ ކަލޯ, lit. 'Lord Koimala') is the last pre-Islamic and the earliest verifiable ruler of the Maldives. He reigned from A.D. 1117 to A.D. 1141.

According to the Isdhoo Loamaafaanu, he unified the Maldives from Minicoy (now a part of India) to Addu in the south under his rule. Local folklores claim that he was the second Muslim ruler, however it is his successor, Dhovemi, who converted to Islam in 1153.

== Legend ==
Some versions of his legend claim that it refers to the first ruler of the Maldives after the conversion to Islam, Dharumavantha rasgefaanu, who ruled from 1117 to 1141. It is believed that he was the first king from the House of Theemuge and the Lunar Dynasty. By other accounts he was the fourth king of the Lunar Dynasty founded by King Balaadeettiya as the Soma Vansa Kingdom, although until Koimala the house ruled over only part of the Maldives.

However, ascribing the legend to the first Islamic ruler does not explain who built the large Buddhist monuments that are present in many inhabited islands and that were built in the first millennium AD. It also does not explain the existence of an ancient kingly dynasty in the Maldives before the conversion, as evidenced by the 12th century correspondence from the king to the Sangumanun, or community of Buddhist monks, in Sathudhuvumati (Haddummati Atoll copper plates prove).

According to Maldivian Folklore, Koimala to be a Sinhalese prince of royal birth from Ceylon. The prince is said to have married the king of Ceylon's daughter and made a voyage with her in two vessels from the island. Reaching the Maldives they became becalmed, and rested in Northern Maalhosmadulhu Atoll for sometime. King and gents at Rasgetheemu island (meaning the King's Island) and Queen with her servants at Angolhitheem island (meaning the Queens island or island of servants) and "Vaaverin" (the traders) settled at Vaadhoo island (meaning Traders's island) in Northern Maalhosmadulhu Atoll. The Maldive islanders who were then Buddhists, learning that the two chief visitors were of royal descent from the Buddhist kingdom of Ceylon, invited them to remain and ultimately proclaimed Koimala their king at Rasgetheemu. The new king and his spouse migrated to Malé and settled there with the consent of the aborigines of Giraavaru - then the most important community of Malé Atoll. Until then the Maldives is thought to have been ruled by various matriarchies in different atolls.

After the settlement in Malé, two vessels were dispatched to bring more people of his race to populate Malé. It was not in the tradition for the Giraavaru, and perhaps other aboriginal people of the Maldives, to marry outside their community.

Although he might have been the first king of the whole of Maldives, the story of a prince might instead be a corruption of the stories of King Soorudasaruna-Adeettiya and King Balaadeettiya, both exiled princes from the Kalinga Kingdom of India who founded the Solar and Lunar Dynasties of the Maldives. According to this source (Kitab fi Athaari Meedoo el-Qadimiyyeh by Allama Ahmed Shihabuddine relating from The Maapanansa copper plates), Koimala or Siri Mahaabarana, the son of King Siri Bovana Aananda was the fourth king of the Lunar Dynastry and uncle to King Dhovemi (Siri Bavana-adiththa) the first Sultan (Muslim king) of the Maldives.

Koimala's kingdom was referred to as Malikaddu dhemedhu- or 'all that lies between the Maliku and Addu'. He fought against the Raja Dada'Indians to claim the two northernmost atolls for the newly formed Maldivian kingdom. The atolls from the north to south were then named:

- Malikatholhu (now Minicoy island belonging to India)
- Thiladunmathi (Northern and southern parts of Thiladhunmathi Atoll)
- Miladunmaduva (Northern and southern parts of Miladhunmadulhu Atoll)
- Maalhosmaduva (North and South Maalhosmadulhu Atolls)
- Faadu Bur (Faadhippolhu)
- Mahal Atholhu (The Male' Atolls)
- Ari adhe Atholhu (Ari Atoll)
- Felide Atholhu (Felide Atoll)
- Mulakatholhu (Mulaku Atoll)
- Nilande Atholhu (North and South Nilande Atolls)
- Kolhumaduva (Kolhumadulu)
- Sathudhuvumati (Haddhunmathi Atoll)
- Suvadinmathi (Huvadhu Atoll)
- Addumulah (Addu and Fuvahmulah Atolls)

It is not clear where exactly Ihavandhippulhu Atoll, Maamakunudhoo Atoll, Goifulhafehendhu Atoll, Fasdūtherē Atoll, Vattaru Faru/Atholhu, Gahaafaru Atoll, Rasdhukuramathi Atoll as well as the islands of Alifushi, Kaashidhoo and Thoddoo were grouped in this early classification.

Koimala was succeeded by his nephew Dhovemi Kalaminja in 1141.

Preceded by King Bovana Aananda	King of the Maldives; 1117–1141	Succeeded by Dhovemi
