= Mariyam Kaba'afa'anu Rani Kilege =

Sultana consort of the Maldives (died 1691)

- Sultana consort of the Maldives
- Died: 1691; Dunidu Island
- Sultan Ibrahim Iskander I of the Maldives

Mariyam Kaba'afa'anu Rani Kilege (died 1691) was a Sultana consort of the Maldives by marriage to sultan Ibrahim Iskandar I of the Maldives. She served as regent of the Maldives during the minority of her son, sultan Kuda Muhammad of the Maldives, from 1687 until 1691.

== Life ==
Mariyam was reportedly originally the daughter of a concubine from Hindustan. She became a consort to Ibrahim Iskander I (r. 1648–1687), and mother of his heir, Kuda Muhammad. She was rumored to have poisoned Ibrahim Iskander I, who died in 1687 and was succeeded by her son.

=== Regency ===
Her son was six years old upon his succession to the throne, and initially he was not under the regency of his mother but a regency council of court officials. The regency council kept Maryam out of state affairs, and only gave her a limited allowance.

Mariyam created a power base of followers and soon deposed the regency council and had herself proclaimed regent during her son's minority, taking absolute power. She exiled many of the leading viziers and replaced them with her relatives and favorites.

During her reign, she had traditionally been said to indulge in her personal pleasure, and it was said that she "threw all decency to the winds openly playing the role of a latter day Catherine II of Russia. Nominally married to a commoner, on whom High Rank was conferred, she encouraged unrestricted vice in every form."

=== Death ===
In 1691, the Maldives was tormented by piratical vessels from the Malabar coast descended on Thiladummati [the most northerly] atoll, who committed numerous atrocities before the Maldivian fleet could prepare to confront them. Maryam defeated the pirates with her own fleet and drove them from the islands. When the sultan and queen mother sailed to meet the victorious fleet returning to Male, a spark from the royal salute caused the gunpowder at the royal vessel to explode, killing Maryam near Dunidu Island. Her son the sultan died shortly after of the wounds he sustained during the explosion.

=== Legacy ===
Traditionally, Maryam and her regency has been given a bad reputation in Maldivian history, and she has been painted as an immoral usurper.
