= Hassan IV of the Maldives =

Sultan of the Maldives (1480–1481)

Sultan Hassan IV was the sultan of the Maldives from 1480 to 1481. He was the son of Sultan Mohamed II and Queen Golhaavehi rani kilege. Just one month after his succession to the lion throne (singasanaa) of Maldives, he was deposed by Omar (later sultan Omar II), one of his relatives.
