= Hussain I of the Maldives =

Sultan of Maldives from 1398 to 1409

Sultan Hussain Al-Hilaaly I Sri loka veeru Mahaa radhun was the sultan of Maldives from c. 1398 – c. 1408. He was the son of Hilaaly Kalo and Golhaa vehi kanbulo and also a brother of Sultan Hassan I. He ruled the country for 10 years until his death in 1408 or 1409.
