= Muhammad Imaaduddeen IV =

Sultan of the Maldives from 1835 to 1883

Sultan Muhammad Imaaduddeen IV (Arabic: محمد عماد الدين الرابع; Dhivehi: މުހައްމަދު އިމާދުއްދީން ހަތަރު ވަނަ އެވެ), was the Sultan of the Maldives from 18 June 1835 to 15 November 1883. He ruled for 48 years, 4 months, and 28 days, making his reign the longest ever in the Maldives. The first map of the Maldives was created during his reign by British forces.

At the beginning of his reign, the Prime Minister was his uncle Athireege Ahmed Dhoshimeyna Kilegefaanu, who died in 1848. Galolhuge Ali Dhoshimeyna Kilegefaanu succeeded his father as the Prime Minister.

Preceded by Muhammad Mueenuddeen I	Sultan of the Maldives; 1835–1883	Succeeded by Ibrahim Nooraddeen
