= Muhammad Mu'iz ud-din =

Sultan of the Maldives from 1774–1779

Sultan Muhammad Mu'iz ud-din Iskander ibni al-Marhum Shah Ghazi al-Hasan 'Izz ud-din (Arabic: محمد معز الدين اسكندر بن المرحوم شاه غازي الحسن عز الدين; Dhivehi: މުޙައްމަދު މުޢިއްޒުއްދީން އިސްކަންދަރު އިބްނީ އަލްމަރުޙޫމް ޝާހު ޣާޒީ އަލްޙަސަން ޢިއްޒުއްދީން), or Kalhu Banda'arain was the Sultan of the Maldives from 1774–1779. He succeeded when his elder brother abdicated.

He died in Malé on 13 September 1779 and was succeeded by Hassan Nooraddeen I.

== See also ==
- Maldives
- List of Maldivian monarchs

Preceded by Sultan Muhammad Shams ud-din Iskandar II	Sultan of the Maldives; 1774–1779	Succeeded by Hassan Nooraddeen I
