= Dhinei of the Maldives =

Al-Sultan Dhinei Kalaminjaa Siri Fennaadheettha Mahaa Radun (Dhivehi: އައްސުލްޠާން ދިނެއި ކަލަމިންޖާ ސިރީ ފެންނާދީއްތަ މަހާރަދުން) was the Sultan of Maldives from 1193 to 1199. He was the son of Fathahiriya Maavaa Kilege (Dhivehi: ފަތަހިރިޔާ މާވާކިލެގެ). He ruled the country for 7 years until his death in 1199. He was succeeded by his younger brother, Dhihei of Maldives.

| Preceded by Ali I | Sultan of the Maldives; 1193–1199 | Succeeded by Dhihei |
