= Abu Mansur Mauhub al-Jawaliqi =

Arab grammarian, Philologist, Author and Imam of Later Abbasid era (1074–1144)

Al-Jawaliqi الجوالیقی
- Born: Abu Mansur Mauhub ibn Ahmad bin Muhammad bin al-Khidhr bin al-Hassan al-Jawaliqi al-Baghdadi أبو منصور موهوب بن أحمد بن محمد بن الخضر بن الحسن الجواليقي البغدادي; April 1074; Baghdad, Iraq
- Died: 17 July 1144 (aged 70); Baghdad, Iraq
- Occupations: grammarian, philologist
- Writing career
- Period: Islamic golden age (Later Abbasid era)
- Notable works: Kitab al-Mu'arrab کتاب المُعَرَّب

Abū Manṣūr Mauhūb al-Jawālīqī (Arabic: أبو منصور الجواليقي) (April 1074–17 July 1144) was an Arab grammarian born in Baghdād, where he studied philology under Khātib al-Tibrizī (1030 – 1109) and became famous for his handwriting. In his later years he acted as Imam to the 12th century Abbāsid caliph Al-Muqtafi li-Amr Allah.

== Works ==
- Kitāb al-Mu'arrab (كتاب المُعَرَّب), (tr. 'Explanation of Foreign Words used in Arabic'). His chief work; published as edited text from an incomplete manuscript by Eduard Sachau (Leipzig, 1867). Many of the lacunae in this have been supplied from another manuscript by W. Spitta in the Journal of the German Oriental Society, xxxiii. 208 sqq.
- Al-Jawālīqī's Supplement to the Durrat ul-Ghawwas of Al-Hariri of Basra; published as Le Livre des locutions vicieuses, Arabic text with French introduction and notes by Hartwig Derenbourg, Morgenländische Forschungen (Leipzig, 1875), pp. 107–166.

== See also ==
- Abd al-Latif al-Baghdadi, a physician, philosopher, historian and grammarian.
