= Fatima Kabafa'anu =

Sultana regnant of the Maldives

Fatima Kabafa'anu (fl. 1704), was a Sultana regent of the Maldives. She was the consort of Sultan Ibrahim Mudzhiruddine of the Maldives (r. 1701–1704), and briefly regent herself during the minority of her son in 1704.

== Life ==
Her husband was rumored to have died during the trip on his return from his pilgrimage to Mecca. When the rumor reached Malé, Fatima took power with the intent to proclaim herself monarch of the Maldives. During her reign, she banished her rival and brother-in-law, admiral Hussain to Naifaru.

Fatima was, however, defeated by prime minister Mohamed Faamuladeyri Thakurufan, who removed her from the royal palace Eterekoilu and proclaimed himself monarch under the name Sultan Muhammad Imaduddin II.
