= Muhammad Imaduddin I =

Sultan of Maldives

Sultan of the Maldives
- Reign: 1620–1648
- Born: 1580
- Died: 1648 (aged 67–68)
- Dynasty: Utheemu
- Father: Umar Maafai Kilage
- Mother: Mariyam Kabaidhi Kilage

Mohamed Imaduddin I (Arabic: محمد عماد الدين الأول; Dhivehi: މުހައްމަދު އިމާދު އުއްދީން އައި) (1580–1648) was the Sultan of Maldives from 11 December 1620 to 1648. He undertook the reconstruction of palaces in Malé and successfully defended the capital from invasion by the Portuguese navy in 1625. Following this victory, he focused on building fortifications, including a strong wall around Malé, and imported cannons. During his reign, he put down an insurrection led by noble Saamiyaa Faashanaa, who fled to Minicoy but was later captured and banished.

He was the son of Umar Maafai Kilage and Mariyam Kabaidhi Kilage. After ruling for 28 years, the sultan died at the age of 68 and was buried in the Koilu Mosque.

== Origin ==
Sultan Mohamed Imaduddin I was the son of Utheemu Ali Thakurufaanu. His mother, Amina Kabadi Kile, was married to Mariyam Kandi Kile of Utheemu Ali Thakurufaanu or Ali Khatib Thakurufaanu. His father was Umar Maamah Kile of Madifushi, Th.

== Becoming sultan ==
Kalhu Tukkala, who was taken from Malabar after Sultan Ibrahim III Shaheed, learned about the death of Sultan Hussain Famuladerekile while in Kanannoor.

== During the reign ==
Sultan Mohamed Imaduddin I was married to His Excellency Aisha. The kingdom was in a poor state when he ascended to the throne, and his top priority was to rebuild. He focused on fortifying the kingdom by surrounding it with a strong wall and addressing what lay outside the wall.

== War with the Portuguese ==
In the fifth year of his reign, a group of Portuguese nationals attacked Malé. Before this conflict, his reign was strong. He prioritized uniting his ministers and soldiers, ensuring they pledged to remain steadfast in battle. The Portuguese brought five guns to Malé, but the Maldivians ultimately won the war. Despite their defeat, the Portuguese burned down Villingili Mosque as they retreated. The conflict occurred in Hijra 1034.

== Peace ==
The Sultan took measures to ensure the kingdom's security. He created a large court connected to his palace and established parades and fortifications around Malé. Doors were installed to protect the city, and the island was fortified to prevent unauthorized entry.

== Conflict with Samiyakilege ==
Throughout his reign, Sultan Mohamed Imaduddin I faced challenges from Samiya Kilege, the sister of Aisha and the ruler of Maafilaafushi. On several occasions, the Sultan's army had to subdue Samiya Kilege. Eventually, Samiya Kilege was arrested in Malé and exiled to Fuvahmulah City, where she died. This strengthened the Sultan's power.

== Death ==
Sultan Mohamed Imaduddin I died on 5 Shawwal 1058 AH, having ruled for 29 years.
