= Mohamed II of the Maldives =

Sultan Muhammad II Sri Bavana Mahaa Radhun was the Sultan of Maldives from c. 1467 – c. 1481, succeeding his father Sultan Hassan III to the throne. He was known as a cruel Sultan who ruled like his father.
