= Hilaalee dynasty =

Royal dynasty in the Maldives (1388– 1573)

Hilaalee dynasty of the Maldives
- 1388–1573
- Status: Portuguese presence (1558- 1573). Ottoman vassal state (1565-1737)
- Capital: Malé
- Common languages: Maldivian
- Religion: Islam, Christianity
- Government: Sultanate (1388-1558), Kingdom (1558-1573) (Note: de facto: Kingdom under Portuguese protection (protectorate), de jure: Sultanate)
- Monarchs
  - 1388-1198 (first): Sultan Hassan I
  - 1558-1573 (last): King Dom Manuel
- Historical era: Middle Age
  - Established: 1388
  - First interregnum: 1552
  - Second interregnum started and disestablished: 1573
- Currency: Rufiyaa
Preceded by	Succeeded by
Theemuge dynasty	Interregnum (History of the Maldives); Utheemu dynasty
- Today part of: Maldives

Hilaalee dynasty was one of the earlier Muslim ruling-dynasties of the history of the Maldives. It ruled the country from 1388 to 1573. It came under Portuguese power in 1558 and disestablished in 1573 after the Utheemu rebellion against the Portuguese presence. After the disestablishment, an interregnum period started in the history of the Maldives.

== History ==
The first king of the Maldivian Hilaalee dynasty was Hassan I of the Maldives and he was proclaimed king in the year 1388 AD.

Historians differ on the origin of Hilaalee family. One view holds that Hassan I (Hassan Al-Hilaaly) was the great-grandson of a man named Hilaalee, who migrated from Malabar to Hulhule' island.

According to another view, the dynasty descended from a Somali family who migrated to Hulhule' island.

Some historical documents reveal that Hilali Kalo Hassan dethroned King Uthman Rasgefaan, who was the ruling King at that time and outcast him and all his ministers. After this Hilai Kalo Hassan started the Hilai Dynasty.

== See also ==
- List of Maldivian monarchs
- List of Sunni dynasties
