= Osman I of the Maldives =

Osman I of Fehendhoo was the Sultan of the Maldives in 1388. He ruled the country for 6 months and 15 days. Sultan Osman was also the last sultan to ascend the throne of the Maldives from the Lunar Dynasty, ending the 227 years of Lunar Dynasty rule since the Maldives converted to Islam from Buddhism.

Sultan Osman I was forced to abdicate and banished to Kolhumadulu Atoll Guraidhoo, where he would die. His tomb was found in 1922, now in the Guraidhoo Ziyaaraiy Mosque.

Preceded by Abdullah II	Sultan of the Maldives; 1388	Succeeded by Hassan I
