= Yoosuf II of the Maldives =

Sultan of the Maldives

Sultan Yoosuf II Dri loka aanandha Mahaa Radhun was the Sultan of the Maldives from 1421 to 1443. He was the son of Sultan Hassan I.
