= Hassan II of the Maldives =

Fifth Sultan of Maldives in the Hilaaly Dynasty

Sultan Hassan II Sri dhanmaru bavana mahaa radun was the fifth Sultan to ascend the Ranna Badeyri. He was drowned while taking a bath in his bath pool.
