= Hassan Nooraddeen I =

Sultan of the Maldives from 1779–1799

Sultan al-Hajj Hassan Nooraddeenul Iskandhar I (Arabic: حسن نورالدين الإسكندر الأول; Dhivehi: ހަސަން ނޫރައްދީނުލް އިސްކަންދަރު އައި), was the Sultan of the Maldives from 1779–1799. He was the son of Sultan [(Hassan Izzuddin; 14 April 1720 – 1 February 1767), commonly known as Dhon Bandaarain]. Nooraddeen went on hajj twice and on the second occasion he battled with the Sharif of Mecca. He died in Jeddah, together with 238 of the men of the Maldivian army, from an infectious disease called kashividhuri or smallpox.

Preceded by Sultan Muhammad Mu'iz ud-din Iskander ibni al-Marhum Shah Ghazi al-Hasan 'Izz ud-din	Sultan of the Maldives; 1779–1799	Succeeded by Muhammad Mueenuddeen I
