= Isa of the Maldives =

Sultan Isaa Sri bavana sundura mahaa radun ascended the throne of Maldives on 1412 after the death of his brother Sultan Hassan II. He ruled the country for just three months.
