= Hassan III of the Maldives =

Sultan of the Maldives (1443–1467)

Sultan Haji Hassan III Sri Dhaadha Veeru Mahaa Radhun was the sultan of Maldives from 1443 to 1467. He ascended the throne after the death of his father, Sultan Abookuru I. In his 25th year of reign he chose to pay a visit to Mecca for Hajj and he made his young son as the regent while he was away. While he was in Mecca he was deposed by Sayyidh Muhammad (later Sultan Sayyidh Muhammad).

But after returning from Mecca he regained the throne by deposing Sultan Sayyidh Muhanmed and restored the Hilaalee dynasty. When the sultan returned he brought 70 slaves whom he bought from Mecca's Slave Bazaar. He reigned for 26 years.
