= Hassan I of the Maldives =

Sultan of the Maldives (1388–1398)

Sultan Hassan Al-Hilaaly I, Sri Veera Bovana Mahaa Radhun was the first sultan to ascend the throne of Maldives from the Hilaalee dynasty by abolishing the dynasty which had ruled the Maldives for more than two centuries. He ascended the throne of The Maldives in 1388 and ruled for 10 years.

Sultan Hassan I was the son of Hilaaly Kalo and his wife Golhaavehi kanbulo, likely a Lunar dynasty lady. Golhaavehi may have been misread for Kalavehi as the recorded writings in Arabic were old and faint. He ruled until his death in 1398.

Preceded by Osman I of the Maldives	Sultan of the Maldives; 1388-1398	Succeeded by Ibrahim I of the Maldives
