= Theemuge dynasty =

Royal dynasty in the Maldives (1117– 1388)

Theemuge dynasty of the Maldives ތީމު ދަރިކޮޅު
- 1117 (or earlier)–1388
- Capital: Malé
- Common languages: Maldivian
- Religion: Form of Nature Worship, Like (Sun Moon, stars). Buddhism, Islam
- Government: Kingdom (1117–1153), Sultanate (1153–1388)
- Monarchs
  - 1117–1141 (first): King Sri Maha Baranaditya
  - 1388 (last): Sultan Uthman Al-Fahandawi
- Legislature: Majlis
- Historical era: Middle Age
  - Established: 1117 (or earlier)
  - Disestablished: 1388
- Currency: Rufiyaa
Preceded by	Succeeded by
Kingdom of Dheeva Maari	Hilaalee dynasty
- Today part of: Maldives

Theemuge dynasty (Maldivian: ތީމުގެ ދަރިކޮޅު) or Homa Dharikolhu (Maldivian: ހޯމަ ދަރިކޮޅު) was one of the early dynasties of the Maldives that reigned from circa 1117 (or earlier) until c.1388.

== Sources ==
The dynasty is attested in chronicles such as Tarikh lslam Diba Mahal, compiled in the eighteenth century. According to the Tarikh, the first Maldivian ruler to convert to Islam was Dhovemi of the Maldives of the Theemuge dynasty, who adopted the name Sultan Muhammad-ul-Adil. Ibn Battuta visited the Maldives several times during the reign of Khadijah of the Maldives and left a detailed record in The Travels of Ibn Battuta.

== History ==
The first king of the Theemuge dynasty is known as Siri Mahabarana and he is believed to be Koimala Kalo. Sri Mahabarana was proclaimed king in the year 1117 or 1118. Other sources suggest that the Theemuge Dharikolhu was the new name of the Soma Vansa Lunar Dynastry after the conversion to Islam of King Dhovemi which lasted from c.1153 to c.1388. In this case King Dhovemi, the fifth king of the Lunar Dynastry became the first King of the Theemuge Dynastry.

Svasti Sri Somavamsa Adipati Sri Theemuge Sri Maha Parama Aditya Maha Radun became the first king to rule over the whole of Maldives after reclaiming the northern atolls from the Indian invaders.

== See also ==
- List of Maldivian monarchs
- List of Sunni dynasties
