= List of monarchs who abdicated =

This is a list of monarchs who have abdicated. Some monarchs have been forced to abdicate. The list is chronological.

== List ==
Ruler	Country	Position	Abdication date	Successor/Fate
Kuai of Yan	State of Yan	King of Yan	318 BC	Zi Zhi
Wuling of Zhao	State of Zhao	King of Zhao	299 BC	Huiwen of Zhao
Liu Ying	Western Han dynasty	Emperor of China	10 January AD 9	Wang Mang
Xian of Han	Eastern Han dynasty	Emperor of China	11 December 220	Wen of Cao Wei
Cao Huan	Cao Wei	Emperor of China	4 February 266	Wu of Jin
Diocletian	Roman Empire	Roman emperor	1 May 305	Galerius
Maximian	Roman Empire	Roman emperor	1 May 305	Constantius Chlorus
Maximian	Roman Empire	Roman emperor	11 November 308	Licinius
Lü Guang	Later Liang	Heavenly King	339	Yin of Later Liang
Vetranio	Roman Empire	Roman emperor	25 December 350	Constantius II
An of Jin	Jin dynasty	Emperor of China	20 December 403	Wudao of Huan Chu
Constantine III	Western Roman Empire	Roman emperor	411	Honorius
Gong of Jin	Jin dynasty	Emperor of China	5 July 420	Wu of Liu Song
Avitus	Western Roman Empire	Roman emperor	17 October 456	Majorian
Xianwen of Northern Wei	Northern Wei	Emperor of China	20 September 471	Xiaowen of Northern Wei
Glycerius	Western Roman Empire	Roman emperor	24 June 474	Julius Nepos
Shun of Liu Song	Liu Song	Emperor of China	29 May 479	Gao of Southern Qi
He of Southern Qi	Southern Qi	Emperor of China	502	Wu of Liang
Xiaojing of Eastern Wei	Eastern Wei	Emperor of China	550	Wenxuan of Northern Qi
Xiao Dong	Liang dynasty	Emperor of China	551	Hou Jing
Jing of Liang	Liang dynasty	Emperor of China	557	Wu of Chen
Gong of Western Wei	Western Wei	Emperor of China	557	Xiaomin of Northern Zhou
Wucheng of Northern Qi	Northern Qi	Emperor of China	8 June 565	Houzhu of Northern Qi
Xuan of Northern Zhou	Northern Zhou	Emperor of China	1 April 579	Jing of Northern Zhou
Jing of Northern Zhou	Northern Zhou	Emperor of China	581	Wen of Sui
Yang of Sui	Sui dynasty	Emperor of China	8 December 617	Gong of Sui
Gong of Sui	Sui dynasty	Emperor of China	12 June 618	Gaozu of Tang
Yang Tong	Sui dynasty	Emperor of China	23 May 619	Wang Shichong
Gaozu of Tang	Tang dynasty	Emperor of China	4 September 626	Taizong of Tang
Kōgyoku	Japan	Empress of Japan	12 July 645	Kōtoku
Jitō	Japan	Empress of Japan	22 August 697	Monmu
Wu Zhao	Wu Zhou	Emperor of China	21 February 705	Zhongzong of Tang
Ruizong of Tang	Tang dynasty	Emperor of China	8 September 712	Xuanzong of Tang
Genmei	Japan	Empress of Japan	3 October 715	Genshō
Theodosius III	Eastern Roman Empire	Byzantine emperor	25 March 717	Leo III
Genshō	Japan	Empress of Japan	3 March 724	Shōmu
Ceolwulf	Northumbria	King of Northumbria	737	Eadberht
Shōmu	Japan	Emperor of Japan	19 August 749	Kōken
Xuanzong of Tang	Tang dynasty	Emperor of China	12 August 756	Suzong of Tang
Eadberht	Northumbria	King of Northumbria	758	Oswulf
Kōken	Japan	Empress of Japan	7 September 758	Junnin
Junnin	Japan	Empress of Japan	6 November 764	Shōtoku
Kōnin	Japan	Empress of Japan	30 April 781	Kanmu
Shunzong of Tang	Tang dynasty	Emperor of China	28 August 805	Xianzong of Tang
Heizei	Japan	Emperor of Japan	18 May 809	Saga
Staurakios	Eastern Roman Empire	Byzantine emperor	2 October 811	Michael I Rangabe
Michael I Rangabe	Eastern Roman Empire	Byzantine emperor	11 July 813	Leo V
Saga	Japan	Emperor of Japan	29 May 823	Junna
Junna	Japan	Emperor of Japan	22 March 833	Ninmyō
Ninmyō	Japan	Emperor of Japan	4 May 850	Montoku
Seiwa	Japan	Emperor of Japan	18 December 876	Yōzei
Yōzei	Japan	Emperor of Japan	4 March 884	Kōkō
Uda	Japan	Emperor of Japan	4 August 897	Daigo
Ai of Tang	Tang dynasty	Emperor of China	12 May 907	Taizu of Later Liang
Daigo	Japan	Emperor of Japan	16 October 930	Suzaku
Rui of Yang Wu	Yang Wu	Emperor of China	937	Liezu of Southern Tang
Suzaku	Japan	Emperor of Japan	16 May 946	Murakami
Yin of Later Han	Later Han	Emperor of China	951	Taizu of Later Zhou
Gong of Later Zhou	Later Zhou	Emperor of China	960	Taizu of Song
Reizei	Japan	Emperor of Japan	27 September 969	En'yū
En'yū	Japan	Emperor of Japan	24 September 984	Kazan
Kazan	Japan	Emperor of Japan	1 August 986	Ichijō
John XVIII	Papal States	Pope	July 1009	Sergius IV
Ichijō	Japan	Emperor of Japan	16 July 1011	Sanjō
Sanjō	Japan	Emperor of Japan	10 March 1016	Go-Ichijō
Go-Suzaku	Japan	Emperor of Japan	5 February 1045	Go-Reizei
Benedict IX	Papal States	Pope	July 1045	Gregory VI
Michael VI Bringas	Eastern Roman Empire	Byzantine emperor	30 August 1057	Isaac I Komnenos
Isaac I Komnenos	Byzantine Empire	Byzantine emperor	22 November 1059	Constantine X Doukas
Romanos IV Diogenes	Eastern Roman Empire	Byzantine emperor	1 October 1071	Michael VII Doukas
Go-Sanjō	Japan	Emperor of Japan	18 January 1073	Shirakawa
Nikephoros III Botaneiates	Eastern Roman Empire	Byzantine emperor	1 April 1081	Alexios I Komnenos
Shirakawa	Japan	Emperor of Japan	3 January 1087	Horikawa
Henry IV	Holy Roman Empire	Holy Roman Emperor	1105	Henry V
Toba	Japan	Emperor of Japan	25 February 1123	Sutoku
Huizong of Song	Song dynasty	Emperor of China	18 January 1126	Qinzong of Song
Sutoku	Japan	Emperor of Japan	5 January 1142	Konoe
Eric III	Denmark	King of Denmark	1146	Sweyn III; Canute V Valdemar I
Go-Shirakawa	Japan	Emperor of Japan	5 September 1158	Nijō
Gaozong of Song	Song dynasty	Emperor of China	24 July 1162	Xiaozong of Song
Nijō	Japan	Emperor of Japan	3 August 1165	Rokujō
Rokujō	Japan	Emperor of Japan	9 April 1168	Takakura
Dermot McMurrough	Leinster	King of Leinster	1169	Domhnall Caomhánach
Takakura	Japan	Emperor of Japan	18 March 1180	Antoku
Xiaozong of Song	Song dynasty	Emperor of China	18 February 1189	Guangzong of Song
Guangzong of Song	Song dynasty	Emperor of China	24 July 1194	Ningzong of Song
Go-Toba	Japan	Emperor of Japan	18 February 1198	Tsuchimikado
Władysław III Spindleshanks	Duchy of Poland	High Duke of Poland	1206	Leszek the White
Tsuchimikado	Japan	Emperor of Japan	12 December 1210	Juntoku
Juntoku	Japan	Emperor of Japan	13 May 1221	Chūkyō
Chūkyō	Japan	Emperor of Japan	29 July 1221	Go-Horikawa
Shenzong of Western Xia	Western Xia	Emperor of China	1223	Xianzong of Western Xia
Go-Horikawa	Japan	Emperor of Japan	17 November 1232	Shijō
Go-Saga	Japan	Emperor of Japan	16 February 1246	Go-Fukakusa
Kameyama	Japan	Emperor of Japan	6 March 1274	Go-Uda
Valdemar	Kingdom of Sweden	King of Sweden	1277 (deposed 1275)	Magnus Ladulås
Go-Uda	Japan	Emperor of Japan	27 November 1287	Fushimi
Celestine V	Papal States	Pope	13 December 1294	Boniface VIII
John Balliol	Kingdom of Scotland	King of Scots	10 July 1296	Robert I
Fushimi	Japan	Emperor of Japan	30 August 1298	Go-Fushimi
Go-Fushimi	Japan	Emperor of Japan	2 March 1301	Go-Nijō
Hanazono	Japan	Emperor of Japan	29 March 1318	Go-Daigo
Edward II	Kingdom of England	King of England	20 January 1327	Edward III
Andronikos II Palaiologos	Eastern Roman Empire	Byzantine emperor	24 May 1328	Andronikos III Palaiologos
Kōgon	Northern Court of Japan	Emperor of Japan	7 July 1333	Kōmyō
Go-Daigo	Southern Court of Japan	Emperor of Japan	18 September 1339	Go-Murakami
Irene Palaiologina	Empire of Trebizond	Empress of Trebizond	17 July 1341	Anna
Magnus VII	Norway	King of Norway	15 August 1343	Haakon VI
Kōmyō	Northern Court of Japan	Emperor of Japan	18 November 1348	Sukō
Tribhuwana Wijayatunggadewi	Majapahit Empire	Queen of Majapahit	1350	Hayam Wuruk
Sukō	Northern Court of Japan	Emperor of Japan	26 November 1351	Go-Kōgon
John VI Kantakouzenos	Eastern Roman Empire	Byzantine emperor	10 December 1354	John V Palaiologos
Hugh IV	Kingdom of Cyprus	King of Cyprus	24 November 1358	Peter I
Go-kōgon	Northern Court of Japan	Emperor of Japan	9 April 1371	Go-En'yū
Go-En'yū	Northern Court of Japan	Emperor of Japan	24 May 1382	Go-Komatsu
Chōkei	Southern Court of Japan	Emperor of Japan	1383	Go-Kameyama
Go-Kameyama	Japan	Emperor of Japan	19 November 1392	Go-Komatsu
Richard II	Kingdom of England	King of England	29 September 1399	Henry IV
Albert	Kingdom of Sweden	King of Sweden	1405 (deposed 1389)	Margaret
Go-Komatsu	Japan	Emperor of Japan	5 October 1412	Shōkō
Gregory XII	Papal States	Pope	4 July 1415	Martin V
Murad II	Ottoman Empire	Ottoman Sultan	August 1444	Mehmed II
Go-Hanazono	Japan	Emperor of Japan	21 August 1464	Go-Tsuchimikado
Charles I	Norway	King of Norway	June 1450	Christian I
Afonso V	Kingdom of Portugal	King of Portugal	11 November 1477	John II
John II	Kingdom of Portugal	King of Portugal	15 November 1477	Afonso V
Catherine Cornaro	Kingdom of Cyprus	Queen of Cyprus	26 February 1489	Island annexed by the Republic of Venice
Bayezid II	Ottoman Empire	Ottoman Sultan	25 April 1512	Selim I
Charles I (Note: Charles V, Holy Roman Emperor and Charles I of Spain were the same person. He abdicated as Lord of the Netherlands on 25 October 1555 and King of Spain on 16 January 1556 in favor of his son Philip II of Spain. Also in 1556, he separately voluntarily abdicated his German possessions and the title of Holy Roman Emperor in favor of his brother Ferdinand I, Holy Roman Emperor.)	Kingdom of Spain	King of Spain	16 January 1556	Philip II
Charles V	Holy Roman Empire	Holy Roman Emperor	27 August 1556	Ferdinand I
Mary	Kingdom of Scotland	Queen of Scots	24 July 1567	James VI
Ōgimachi	Japan	Emperor of Japan	17 December 1586	Go-Yōzei
Go-Yōzei	Japan	Emperor of Japan	9 May 1611	Go-Mizunoo
Go-Mizunoo	Japan	Emperor of Japan	22 December 1629	Meishō
Meishō	Japan	Emperor of Japan	14 November 1643	Go-Kōmyō
Christina	Kingdom of Sweden	Queen of Sweden	6 June 1654	Charles X Gustav
Go-Sai	Japan	Emperor of Japan	5 March 1663	Reigen
John II Casimir Vasa	Polish–Lithuanian Commonwealth	King of Poland	16 September 1668	Michał Korybut Wiśniowiecki
Reigen	Japan	Emperor of Japan	2 May 1687	Higashiyama
James II and VII	Kingdom of England	King of England	11 December 1688	William III and II; Mary II
James II and VII	Kingdom of Scotland	King of Scotland	11 December 1688	William III and II; Mary II
Augustus II	Polish–Lithuanian Commonwealth	King of Poland	24 September 1706	Stanisław Leszczyński
Higashiyama	Japan	Emperor of Japan	27 July 1709	Nakamikado
Ulrika Eleonora	Kingdom of Sweden	Queen of Sweden	29 February 1720	Frederick
Philip V	Kingdom of Spain	King of Spain	14 January 1724	Louis I
Victor Amadeus II	Kingdom of Sardinia	King of Sardinia	3 September 1730	Charles Emmanuel III
Ahmed III	Ottoman Empire	Ottoman Sultan	1 October 1730	Mahmut I
Nakamikado	Japan	Emperor of Japan	13 April 1735	Sakuramachi
Sakuramachi	Japan	Emperor of Japan	9 June 1747	Momozono
Charles VII and V	Kingdom of Sicily	King of Naples	6 October 1759	Ferdinand IV and III
Charles VII and V	Kingdom of Naples	King of Sicily	6 October 1759	Ferdinand IV and III
Go-Sakuramachi	Japan	Empress of Japan	23 May 1770	Go-Momozono
Stanislaus II Augustus	Polish–Lithuanian Commonwealth	King of Poland	7 January 1795	Third Partition of Poland
Qianlong	China (Qing dynasty)	Emperor of China	9 February 1796	Jiaqing
Rana Bahadur Shah	Kingdom of Nepal	King of Nepal	8 March 1799	Girvan Yuddha Bikram Shah
Charles Emmanuel IV	Kingdom of Sardinia	King of Sardinia	4 June 1802	Victor Emmanuel I
Francis II	Holy Roman Empire	Holy Roman Emperor	6 August 1806	Empire collapsed
Charles IV	Kingdom of Spain	King of Spain	19 March 1808	Ferdinand VII
Ferdinand VII	Kingdom of Spain	King of Spain	6 May 1808	Joseph I
Gustav IV Adolf	Kingdom of Sweden	King of Sweden	29 March 1809	Charles XIII
Louis Bonaparte	(Netherlands) Kingdom of Holland	King of Holland	2 July 1810	Napoléon Louis Bonaparte
Joseph I	Kingdom of Spain	King of Spain	11 December 1813	Ferdinand VII
Frederick VI	Norway	King of Norway	14 January 1814	Christian Frederick
Napoleon I	First French Empire	Emperor of the French	11 April 1814	Bourbon Restoration
Christian Frederick	Norway	King of Norway	10 October 1814	Charles II
Kōkaku	Japan	Emperor of Japan	7 May 1817	Ninkō
Victor Emmanuel I	Kingdom of Sardinia	King of Sardinia	13 March 1821	Charles Felix
Pedro IV	Kingdom of Portugal	King of Portugal (Note: Pedro IV of Portugal and Pedro I of Brazil were the same person. He was already Emperor of Brazil when he succeeded to the throne of Portugal in 1826, but abdicated two months later in favour of his daughter Maria II of Portugal. Later, he abdicated the throne of Brazil in favour of his son Pedro II.)	28 May 1826	Maria II
Charles X	Kingdom of France	King of France	2 August 1830	Louis Philippe I
Louis XIX (Note: Louis was only "King" of France for the twenty minutes it took for him to decide to sign the instrument of abdication. This means his 'abdication' is debatable. However, abdication as an heir has no legal basis; therefore he had to become king in order to abdicate.)	Kingdom of France	King of France	2 August 1830	Louis Philippe I
Pedro I	Empire of Brazil	Emperor of Brazil	7 April 1831	Pedro II
Miguel	Kingdom of Portugal	King of Portugal	26 May 1834	Maria II
William I	Kingdom of the Netherlands	King of the Netherlands	7 October 1840	William II
Rajendra Bikram Shah	Kingdom of Nepal	King of Nepal	12 May 1847	Surendra Bikram Shah
Louis Philippe	Kingdom of France	King of the French	24 February 1848	Monarchy abolished
Ferdinand I	Austrian Empire	Emperor of Austria	2 December 1848	Franz Joseph I
Charles II	Duchy of Parma	Duke of Parma	14 March 1849	Charles III
Charles Albert	Kingdom of Sardinia	King of Sardinia	23 March 1849	Victor Emmanuel II
Leopold II	Grand Duchy of Tuscany	Grand Duke of Tuscany	21 July 1859	Ferdinand IV
Isabella II	Kingdom of Spain	Queen of Spain	25 June 1870	Amadeo I
Amadeo I	Kingdom of Spain	King of Spain	11 February 1873	Monarchy abolished
Milan II	Kingdom of Serbia	King of Serbia	6 March 1889	Alexander I
Liliuokalani	Kingdom of Hawaii	Queen of Hawaii	24 January 1895 (relinquished power on 17 January 1893)	Monarchy abolished
Oscar II	Kingdom of Norway	King of Norway	26 October 1905	Haakon VII
Sunjong	Korean Empire	Emperor of Korea	29 August 1910	Annexed by Japan
Xuantong	China (Qing dynasty)	Emperor of China	12 February 1912	Monarchy abolished
Hongxian	Empire of China	Emperor of China	22 March 1916	Monarchy abolished
Nicholas II	Russian Empire	Emperor of Russia	15 March 1917	Monarchy abolished
Ferdinand I	Kingdom of Bulgaria	Tsar of the Bulgarians	3 October 1918	Boris III
Wilhelm II	German Empire	German Emperor	9 November 1918	Monarchy abolished
Wilhelm II	Kingdom of Prussia	King of Prussia	9 November 1918	Monarchy abolished
Marie-Adélaïde	Grand Duchy of Luxembourg	Grand Duchess of Luxembourg	14 January 1919	Charlotte
Constantine I	Kingdom of Greece	King of the Hellenes	27 September 1922	George II
Hussein	Kingdom of Hejaz	King of Hejaz	3 October 1924	Ali
Taimur bin Feisal	Sultanate of Oman	Sultan of Oman	10 February 1932	Said bin Taimur
Prajadhipok	Kingdom of Thailand	King of Siam	2 March 1935	Ananda Mahidol
Edward VIII	United Kingdom of Great Britain and Northern Ireland	King of the United Kingdom	11 December 1936	George VI
Carol II	Kingdom of Romania	King of Romania	6 September 1940	Michael I
Rezā Shāh	Iran	Shah of Iran	16 September 1941	Mohammad Reza Pahlavi
Bảo Đại	Vietnam	Emperor of Vietnam	25 August 1945	Monarchy abolished
Victor Emmanuel III	Kingdom of Italy	King of Italy	9 May 1946	Umberto II
Michael I	Kingdom of Romania	King of Romania	30 December 1947	Monarchy abolished
Wilhelmina	Kingdom of the Netherlands	Queen of the Netherlands	4 September 1948	Juliana
Leopold III	Kingdom of Belgium	King of the Belgians	16 July 1951	Baudouin
Farouk I	Kingdom of Egypt	King of Egypt	26 July 1952	Fuad II
Talal	Hashemite Kingdom of Jordan	King of Jordan	11 August 1952	Hussein
Norodom Sihanouk	Kingdom of Cambodia	King of Cambodia	3 March 1955	Norodom Suramarit
Ali bin Abdullah Al Thani	State of Qatar	Emir of Qatar	24 October 1960	Ahmad bin Ali Al Thani
Saud	Kingdom of Saudi Arabia	King of Saudi Arabia	2 November 1964	Faisal
Charlotte	Grand Duchy of Luxembourg	Grand Duchess of Luxembourg	12 November 1964	Jean
Mohammed Zahir Shah	Afghanistan	King of Afghanistan	24 August 1973	Monarchy abolished
Sisavang Vatthana	Laos	King of Laos	2 December 1975	Monarchy abolished
Juliana	Kingdom of the Netherlands	Queen of the Netherlands	30 April 1980	Beatrix
Letsie III	Kingdom of Lesotho	King of Lesotho	25 January 1995	Moshoeshoe II
Jean	Grand Duchy of Luxembourg	Grand Duke of Luxembourg	7 October 2000	Henri
Norodom Sihanouk	Kingdom of Cambodia	King of Cambodia	7 October 2004	Norodom Sihamoni
Saad Al-Abdullah Al-Salim Al-Sabah	State of Kuwait	Emir of Kuwait	24 January 2006	Sabah Al-Ahmad Al-Jaber Al-Sabah
Jigme Singye Wangchuck	Kingdom of Bhutan	King of Bhutan	9 December 2006	Jigme Khesar Namgyal Wangchuck
Benedict XVI	Vatican City State	Pope	28 February 2013	Francis
Beatrix	Kingdom of the Netherlands	Queen of the Netherlands	30 April 2013	Willem-Alexander
Hamad bin Khalifa Al Thani	State of Qatar	Emir of Qatar	25 June 2013	Tamim bin Hamad Al Thani
Albert II	Kingdom of Belgium	King of the Belgians	21 July 2013	Philippe
Juan Carlos I	Kingdom of Spain	King of Spain	19 June 2014	Felipe VI
Muhammad V (Sultan of Kelantan)	Malaysia	Yang di-Pertuan Agong of Malaysia	6 January 2019	Abdullah (Sultan of Pahang)
Akihito	Japan	Emperor of Japan	30 April 2019	Naruhito
Margrethe II	Kingdom of Denmark	Queen of Denmark	14 January 2024	Frederik X
Henri	Grand Duchy of Luxembourg	Grand Duke of Luxembourg	3 October 2025	Guillaume V

=== Subnational monarchs ===
Ruler	Country	Position	Abdication date	Successor/Fate
Fulk V	County of Anjou	Count of Anjou	2 June 1129	Geoffrey V
Amadeus VIII	Duchy of Savoy	Duke of Savoy	5 February 1440	Louis I
Hassan X	Maldive Islands	Sultan of the Maldive Islands	1701	Ibrahim Muzhir Al-Din I
Amina I	Maldive Islands	Sultana of the Maldive Islands	1754	Amina II
Alexander	Principality of Bayreuth; Principality of Ansbach	Margrave of Brandenburg-Ansbach and Brandenburg-Bayreuth	2 December 1791	Sold to Prussia
Günther Friedrich Karl I	Principality of Schwarzburg-Sondershausen	Prince of Schwarzburg-Sondershausen	19 August 1835	Günther Friedrich Karl II
Ludwig I	Kingdom of Bavaria	King of Bavaria	21 March 1848	Maximilian II
Karl	Principality of Hohenzollern-Sigmaringen	Prince of Hohenzollern-Sigmaringen	27 August 1848	Karl Anton
Joseph	Duchy of Saxe-Altenburg	Duke of Saxe-Altenburg	30 November 1848	Georg
Bernhard II	Duchy of Saxe-Meiningen	Duke of Saxe-Meiningen	20 September 1866	Georg II
Shō Tai	Ryūkyū Kingdom	King of Ryukyu	16 October 1872	Annexed by Japan
Günther Friedrich Karl II	Principality of Schwarzburg-Sondershausen	Prince of Schwarzburg-Sondershausen	17 July 1880	Charles Gonthier
Ibrahim Nooraddeen	Maldive Islands	Sultan of the Maldive Islands	1886	Muhammad Mueenuddeen I
Alexander	Principality of Bulgaria	Prince of Bulgaria	7 September 1886	Ferdinand I
Muhammad Mueenuddeen I	Maldive Islands	Sultan of the Maldive Islands	1888	Ibrahim Nooraddeen
Muhammad Imaaduddeen V	Maldive Islands	Sultan of the Maldive Islands	1893	Muhammad Shamsuddeen III
Muhammad Shamsuddeen III	Maldive Islands	Sultan of the Maldive Islands	1893	Muhammad Imaaduddeen VI
Rama Varma XV	Kingdom of Cochin	Maharaja of Cochin	December 1914	Rama Varma XVI
Ernest Augustus	Duchy of Brunswick	Duke of Brunswick	8 November 1918	Monarchy abolished
Ernest Louis	Grand Duchy of Hesse	Grand Duke of Hesse and by Rhine	9 November 1918	Monarchy abolished
William Ernest	Grand Duchy of Saxe-Weimar-Eisenach	Grand Duke of Saxe-Weimar-Eisenach	9 November 1918	Monarchy abolished
Bernhard III	Duchy of Saxe-Meiningen	Duke of Saxe-Meiningen	10 November 1918	Monarchy abolished
Heinrich XXIV	Principality of Reuss-Greiz	Prince Reuss of Greiz	10 November 1918	Monarchy abolished
Frederick Augustus II	Grand Duchy of Oldenburg	Grand Duke of Oldenburg	11 November 1918	Monarchy abolished
Heinrich XXVII	Principality of Reuss-Gera	Prince Reuss Younger Line	11 November 1918	Monarchy abolished
Joachim Ernst	Duchy of Anhalt	Duke of Anhalt	12 November 1918	Monarchy abolished
Leopold IV	Principality of Lippe	Prince of Lippe	12 November 1918	Monarchy abolished
Ludwig III	Kingdom of Bavaria	King of Bavaria	13 November 1918	Monarchy abolished
Frederick Augustus III	Kingdom of Saxony	King of Saxony	13 November 1918	Monarchy abolished
Ernst II	Duchy of Saxe-Altenburg	Duke of Saxe-Altenburg	13 November 1918	Monarchy abolished
Friedrich	Principality of Waldeck and Pyrmont	Prince of Waldeck and Pyrmont	13 November 1918	Monarchy abolished
Frederick Francis IV	Grand Duchy of Mecklenburg-Schwerin	Grand Duke of Mecklenburg-Schwerin	14 November 1918	Monarchy abolished
Charles Edward	Duchy of Saxe-Coburg and Gotha	Duke of Saxe-Coburg and Gotha	14 November 1918	Monarchy abolished
Adolf II	Principality of Schaumburg-Lippe	Prince of Schaumburg-Lippe	15 November 1918	Monarchy abolished
Frederick II	Grand Duchy of Baden	Grand Duke of Baden	22 November 1918	Monarchy abolished
Günther Victor	Principality of Schwarzburg-Rudolstadt; Principality of Schwarzburg-Sondershausen	Prince of Schwarzburg-Rudolstadt and Schwarzburg-Sondershausen	22 November 1918	Monarchy abolished
William II	Kingdom of Württemberg	King of Württemberg	30 November 1918	Monarchy abolished
Hassan Nooraddeen II	Maldive Islands	Sultan of the Maldive Islands	1943	Abdul Majeed Didi
Charles Vyner Brooke	Kingdom of Sarawak	Rajah of Sarawak	1 July 1946	Monarchy abolished
Omar Ali Saifuddien III	Brunei Darussalam	Sultan of Brunei	4 October 1967	Hassanal Bolkiah
Said bin Taimur	Sultanate of Muscat and Oman	Sultan of Oman	23 July 1970	Qaboos bin Said
Ahmad Shah	Sultanate of Pahang	Sultan of Pahang	11 January 2019	Abdullah

== Gallery ==
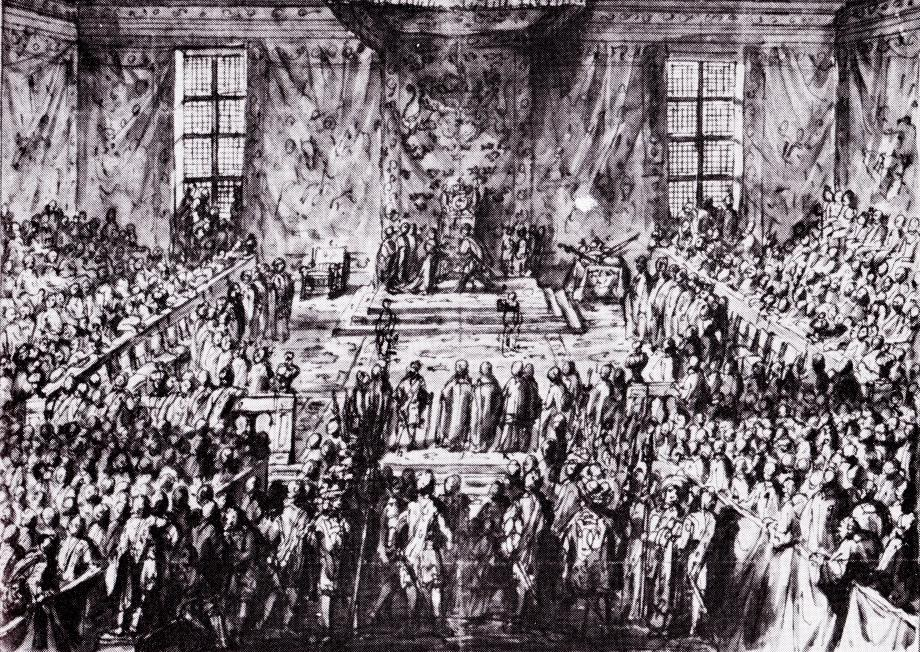
To move to Rome, Queen Christina of Sweden abdicated on her own initiative at Upsala Castle, 6 June 1654

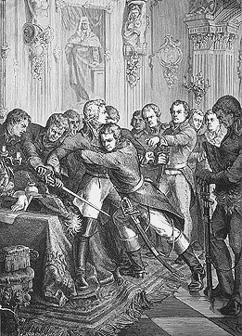
King Gustav IV Adolf of Sweden was seized by rebels at Stockholm Palace on 13 March 1809, forcing him to abdicate two weeks later.

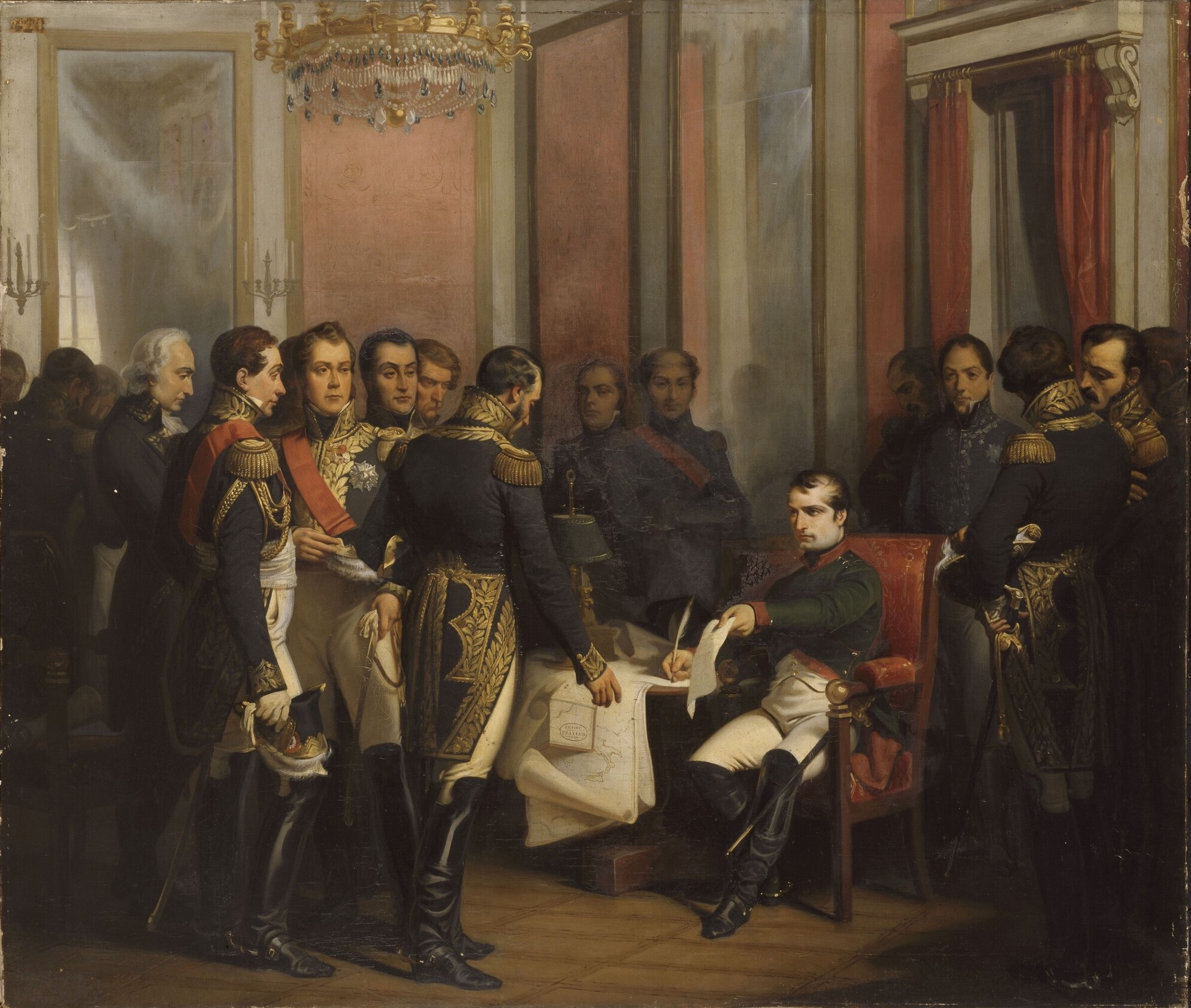
Napoleon's first abdication, signed at the Palace of Fontainebleau on 4 April 1814

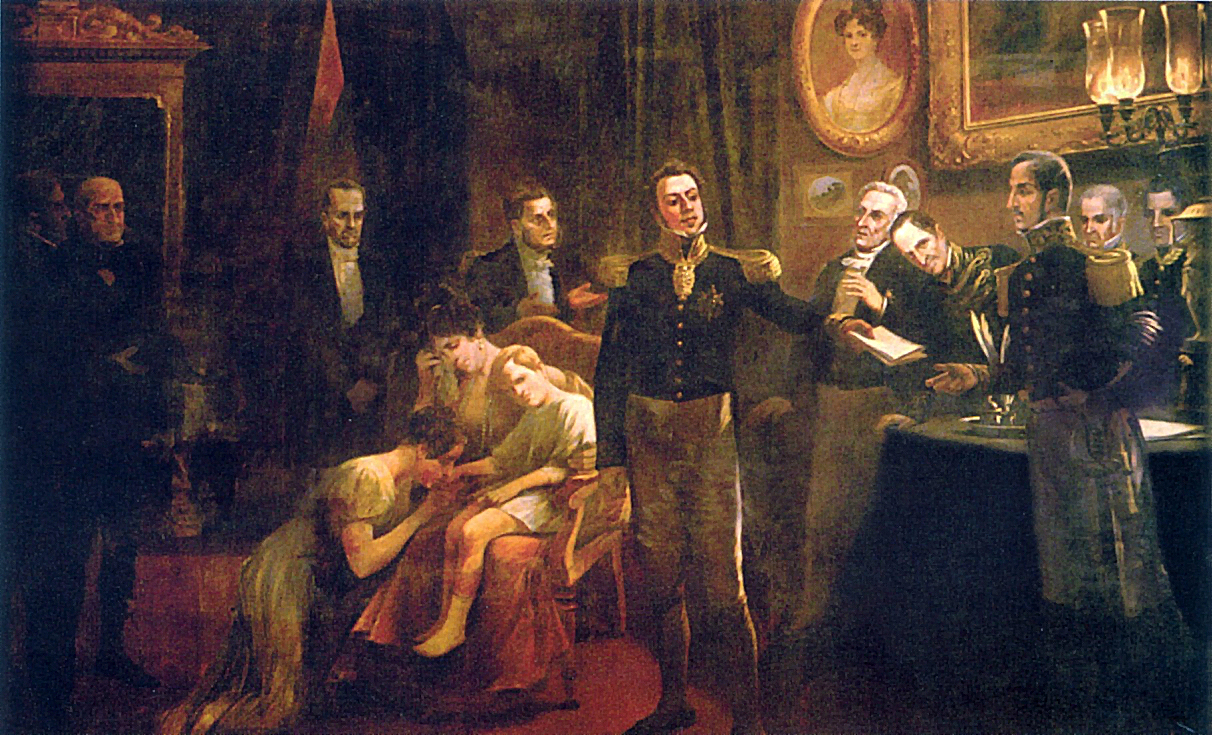
Dom Pedro I, ruler of the Empire of Brazil, delivers his abdication letter on 7 April 1831

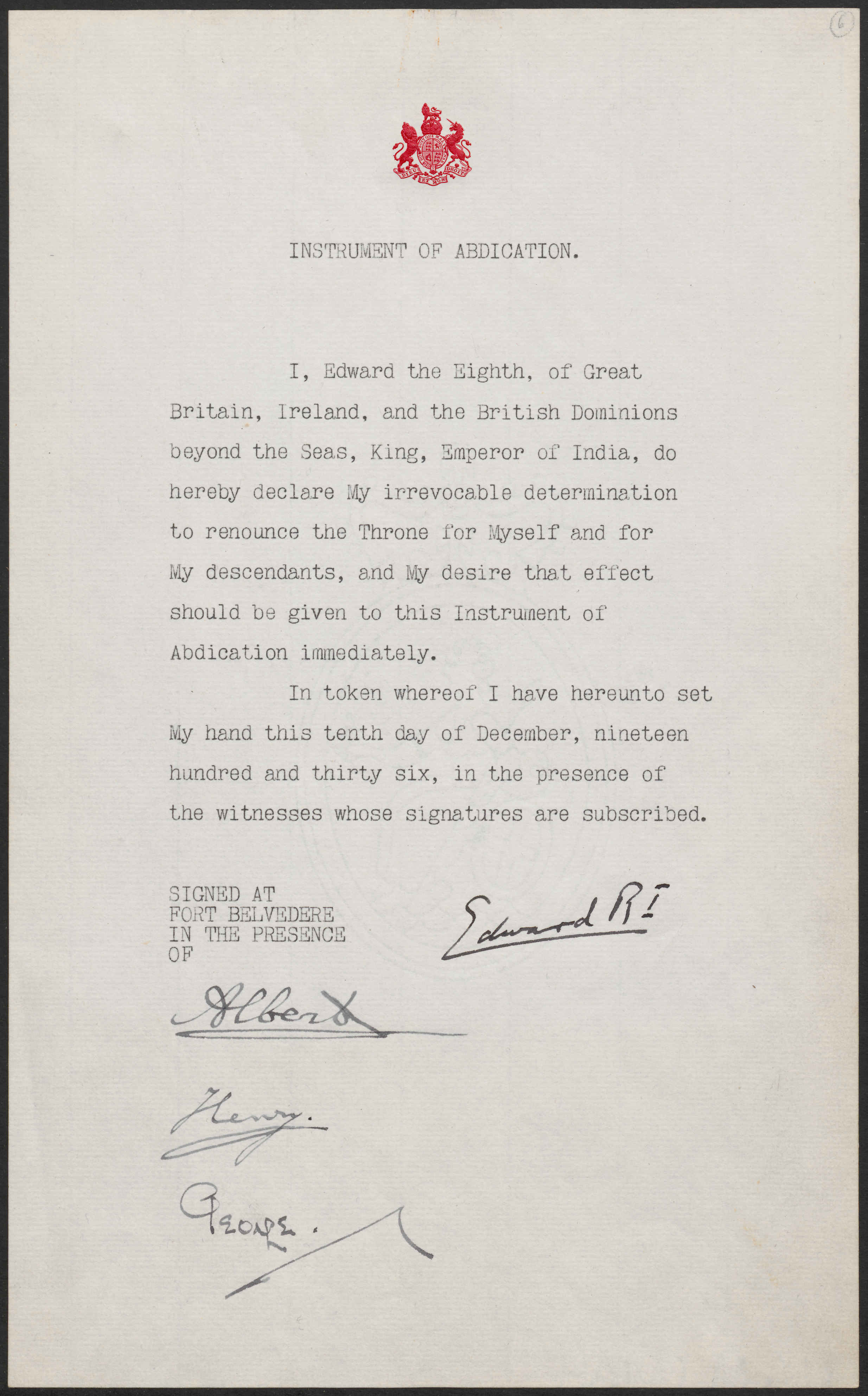
Instrument of abdication signed by King Edward VIII and his three brothers, Albert, Henry and George, 10 December 1936

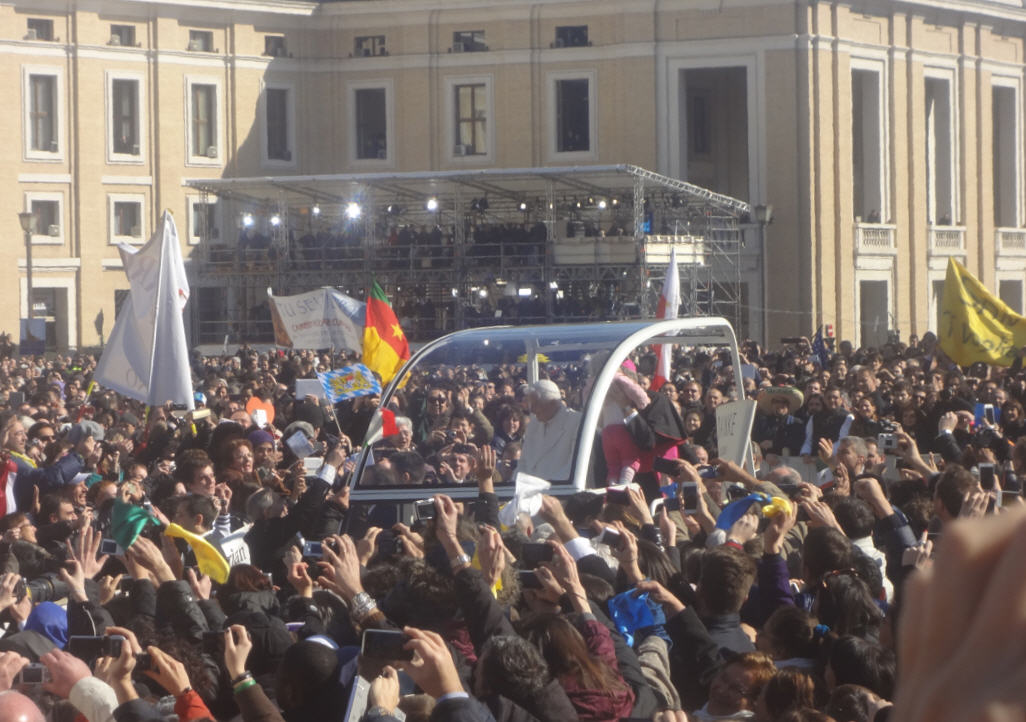
Benedict XVI in the popemobile at his final Wednesday General Audience in St. Peter's Square on 27 February 2013

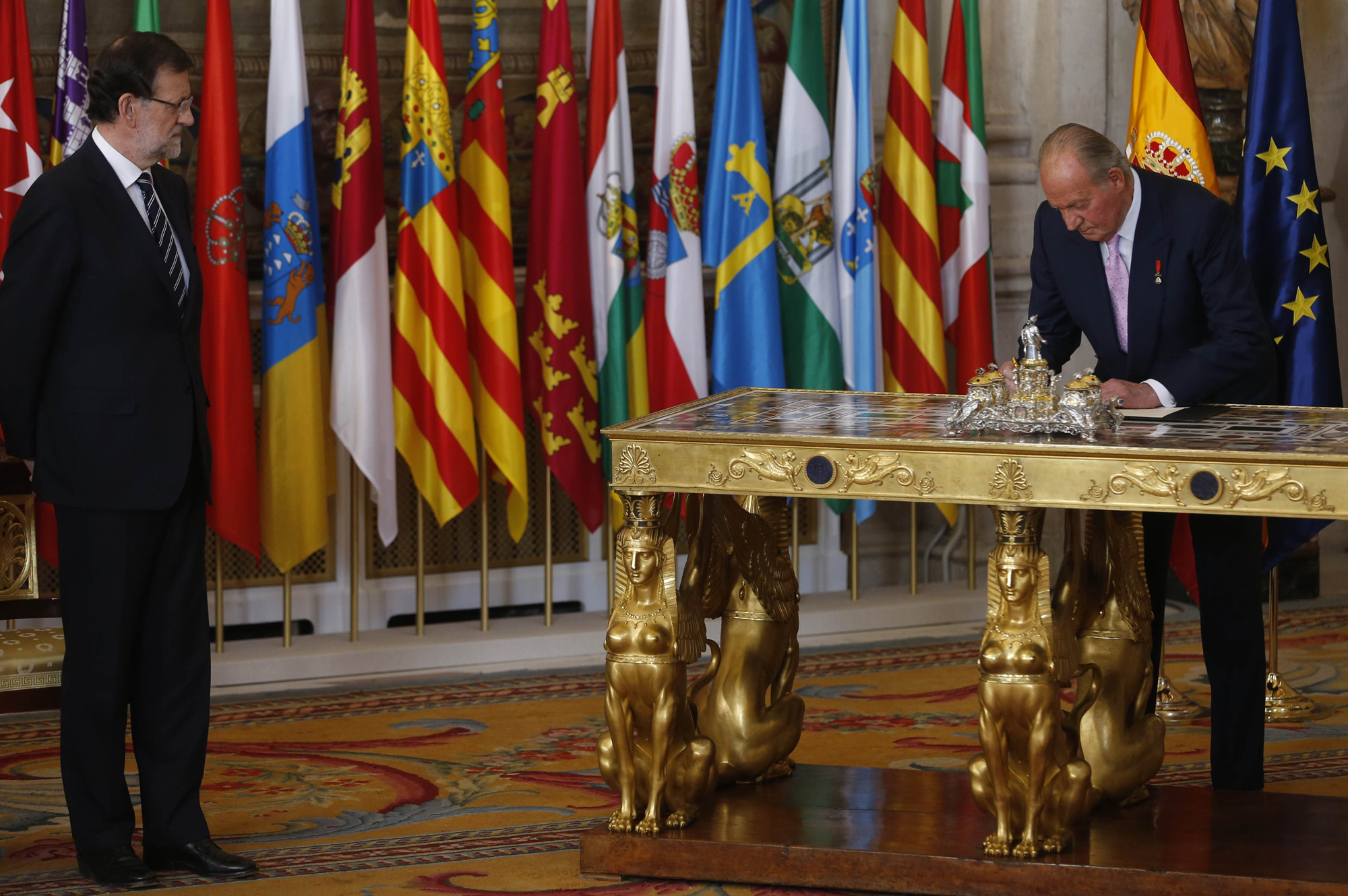
Juan Carlos signing his own abdication law in front of PM Rajoy, June 2014

== See also ==
- Lists of monarchs who lost their thrones
