= Interregnum (History of the Maldives) =

Several interregnums occurred in the history of the Maldives.

== First interregnum (1552- 1554) ==
- Dynasty: Hilaalee dynasty

Preceded by -	First interregnum 1552-1554	Succeeded by Interregnum of 1573

In 1551, the brother of Mohamed III, Hasan IX became sultan. He renounced Islam and converted to Christianity. He was deposed upon conversion, and known subsequently by the Lusitanian name of Dom Manoel. Then the first interregnum occurred and Maldives was ruled by a Council of Ministers from 1552 to 1554.

== Second interregnum (1573) ==
- Dynasty: Hilaalee dynasty

Preceded by Interregnum of 1552-1554	Second interregnum 1573	Succeeded by Interregnum of 1757-1759

Ali IV became sultan in 1557, who killed in battle. King Dom Manoel (in absentia) was restored as the king in 1558, formerly known as Sultan Hasan IX. A Maldivian Catholic named Andiri Andirin acted as his regent, while Manoel lived in Goa. Then Maldives ruled by Kateeb Muhammad Thakurufaanu Al Auzam of Utheemu after he assassinated Andiri Andirin, the regent of King Dom Manoel. As per a treaty he got refuge from Ali Raja of Cannanore, Muhammad Thakurufaanu's base of operation was Minicoy under the sovereignty of Cannanore. Keteeb Muhammad Thakurufaanu did not honour this promise. The Ali Raja demanded dominion over the Maldives, as promised to him by the Kateeb of Uteemu.

The nature of the relationship between Kateeb Muhammad Thakurufaanu and the Ali Raja of Cannanore was outlined in a letter sent by a later Ali Raja, Mariambe Ali-Adi Raja Bibi, to the Sultan Mohamed Mueenuddine I of the Maldives. The letter was dated Friday 17 Jamada-el-oula Anno Hegirae 1243 (7 December AD 1827). According to the letter Mohamed Thakurufan had entered into a treaty ceding sovereignty of the Maldives to the Ali Raja of Cannanore in the event Thakurufaanu was established in power in Male.

Kateeb Muhammad Thakurufaanu concluded a treaty with King Dom Manoel in order to ward off the Ali Raja of Cannanore with whose help the Kateeb seized power in Male.

== Third interregnum (1757- 1759) ==
- Dynasty: Dhiyamigili dynasty

Preceded by Interregnum of 1573	Third interregnum 1757-1759	Succeeded by Interregnum of 1773

From 1752 to 1757, Sultan Muhammad Imaduddin III was held captive on Kavaratti island until his death in 1757. In 1752, he was seized by the Ali Raja of Cannanore and transported to Kavaratti island in the Laccadives. Male was occupied. The occupation was ended by Muleegey Dom Hasan Maniku, a direct descendant of the penultimate Christian King Joao. The sultan died in captivity. During this time Maldives was ruled by the captive sultan's niece Amina I of Maldives and his daughter, Amina II. The de facto regent was Muleegey Dom Hassan Maniku. Regency continued in expectation of the return of the deceased sultan's heir from captivity.

== Fourth interregnum (1773) ==
- Dynasty: Dhiyamigili dynasty

Preceded by Interregnum of 1757-1759	Fourth interregnum 1773	Succeeded by Interregnum of 1944-1952

In 1766, after a restoration, Muhammed Ghiya'as ud-din became sultan. He deposed while on the Hajj pilgrimage. A new interregnum period started in 1773 and sultan's elder sister Amina I again became regent. Her husband Ali Shahbandar took power during her regency, and Dhiyamigili dynasty lost the throne in the cascade of events that followed. Muhammad Manikfaanu of Huraa usurped the throne and later abdicated in favour of his nephew who became sultan Muizzuddin. Amina and her husband were banished to a remote island in Laamu Atoll. Interregnum ended dramatically and Huraa dynasty came into the power.

== Fifth interregnum (1944- 1952) ==
- Dynasty: Huraa dynasty

Preceded by Interregnum of 1773)	Fifth interregnum 1944-1952	Succeeded by -

During British protectorate, Sultan Muhammad Imaaduddeen VI (reign. 1893–1902), the former regent for Sultan Muhammad Imaaduddeen V and Muhammad Shamsuddeen III, was deposed while in the Ottoman Empire. After him, Muhammad Shamsuddeen III (second reign. 1902–1934) became sultan again. But he was deposed and exiled. Then the political crisis started. Sultan Hassan Nooraddeen II (reign. 1935- 1943), who became sultan in 1935, was forced to abdicate in 1943 by the British rulers that time. Then the fifth interregnum of the history of the Maldives started. Although Abdul Majeed Didi was elected Sultan but was never installed and continued to live in Ceylon. Maldives ruled by Council of Regency headed for a time by former sultan Hassan Nooraddeen II. Following the death of Abdul Majeed, and after a national referendum, the Maldives became a republic.

== See also ==
- List of Maldivian monarchs
