= Royal Palaces of the Maldives =

Overview of the royal places of the Maldives

The royal palaces of Maldives (Dhivehi: ގަނޑުވަރު) Is the royal palace of Monarch of the Maldives The Sultanate of Maldives was abolished in 1968.

== Usgekolhu ==
The only remaining building from the Ethere Koilu (aka Bodu Gan'duvaru, which means the Great Palace), the Chief Palace of the Sultan of Maldives, inside the Sultan Park of today. The building is called Usgekolhu. It was built by Sultan Haji Imaduddeen in 1904 for his wife to whom he was going to marry from Suez, Egypt. But before it was completed and while he was in Suez to marry her, he lost the throne. He was deposed by the chiefs of that time and his cousin and the eldest son of the former Sultan Ibrahim Nooraddeen was enthroned as Sultan Mohamed Shamsuddeen. Usgekolhu was later completed by Sultan Shamsuddeen. During the rule of Prime Minister Mohamed Amin Didi, Usgekolhu was converted into the first National Museum on November 19, 1952. When Prime Minister Ibrahim Nasir (and later as president) dismantled all the buildings inside the palace premises he kept Usgekolhu as it was. Usgekolhu was used as the National Museum until July 26, 2010, when the present museum building was officially opened.

== Bodu Gan'duvaru ==
Bodu Gan'duvaru was the palace or house of Maldivian monarchs of the Huraa dynasty. The last king of the Maldives to reign on Bodu Gan'duvaru was Muhammad Fareed Didi. Bodu Ganduvaru was demolished under the direct edict of then Prime Minister Ibrahim Nasir, on March 16, 1963. The walls of Bodu Ganduvaru was built from coral rocks, and using "Dhiyaa hakuru" (Dhivehi: ދިޔާ ހަކުރު, lit. 'Coconut honey'), sugar mortar was comparatively stickier than limestone mortar giving sturdier structures.

Bodu Ganduvaru had three major quarters, which is the "Bodu Kibaa" or the quarter where the sultan engaged in matters related to governance, "Kuda Kiba" and "Weyoge". The King conducts his matters of governance at the "Mathige" which is store room, the veranda of it is called the "Katakaraamathi"; a structure made from wood with copper sheets bolted together to form its roof. In 1609, Indian Malabar pirates attempted to siege the palace, causing significant destruction to the palace's interior. In 1752, the palace was destroyed and during the rule of Muhammad Shamsuddeen III it was rebuilt.

== Dhiyamigili Gan'duvaru ==
Dhiyamigili Ganduvaru is the royal palace or house of the Dhiyamigili dynasty, that ruled the Sultanate of the Maldive Islands from 1704 to 1757. The palace was built from wood and stones. It was planned to be transformed into a site museum.

== Utheemu Gan'duvaru ==
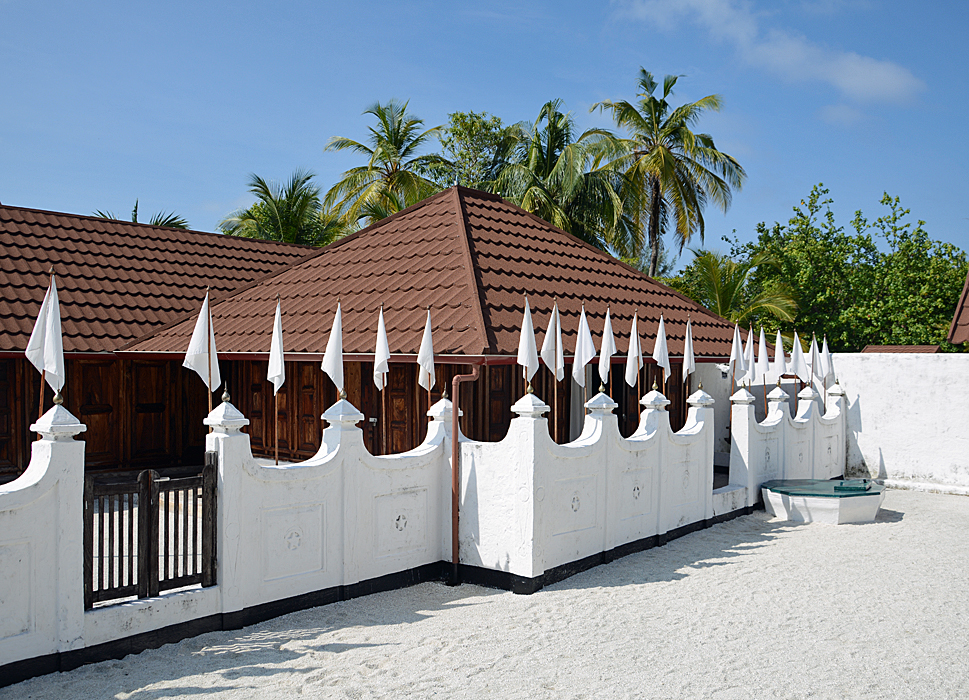

Utheemu Gan'duvaru is the birthplace and palace of Muhammad Thakurufaanu al-Auzam of the Utheemu dynasty. He ruled the country for 12 years until his death in 1585.
