= Family of Iskander II of the Maldives =

Family of a Maldivian Monarch

Family of Iskander ll of the Maldives އިސްކަންދަރު ދޭއްގެ އާއިލާ Rannava Loka family Kilegefaanunge Dharikolhu
- Royal Family
- Parent family: Family of Imaaduddin ll, Family of Dhiyamigili dynasty.
- Country: Maldives
- Current region: Addu Atoll, Fuvahmulah, Malé and more
- Origin: Dhiyamigili dynasty Maldives
- Founded: 1600's (Over 400 years ago)
- Founder: Ibrahim Iskander II
- Final ruler: Muhammad Mu'iz ud-din
- Historic seat: Dhiyamigili Ganduvaru (Note: Dhiyamigili Ganduvaru was used by Sultan Muhammed Ghiya'as ud-din and more Monarch's of Dhiyamigili dynasty); Meedhoo Ganduvaru (Note: Meedhoo Ganduvaru was used by Princess Aisha Didi daughter of Prince Abdulla it was later used by the children of Princess Aisha Didi); karayya Ganduvaru (Note: The grandchildren of Prince Abdulla used to live in Karayya Ganduvaru); and more
- Styles: Didi; Prince/Princess
- Members: Mohamed Imaaduddin ll; Ibrahim Iskander ll; Muhammed Ghiya'as ud-din; Prince Abdulla
- Connected members: Muhammad Mu'iz ud-din; Princess Zareena nooradheen; Ibrahim Ranna Bandeyri Manikfaan
- Connected families: Huraa dynasty; Kakaagey Family

The Family of Iskander ll was a Maldivian family. It is the family of Iskander ll of the Maldives and his ancestors. The family is an origin Family of Dhiyamigili dynasty and Malé. The family was formed around 400 years ago by Muhammed Dhorhimeyna Thakurufaan, who is the Great-Great-Grandfather of Sultan Iskander ll of the Maldives. The family is also connected to Huraa dynasty, through Iskander ll's great-granddaughter Princess Aisha Rani Kilegefan, she is also known as Kakaagey Kalhu Goma.

Iskander ll's family is also related to Sultan Hassan Nooraddeen II's family through Iskander ll's great-grandchild, Kakaagey Ali Didi. He is married to Princess Zareena Nooradheen, who is the daughter of Hassan Nooraddeen II.

== Maldivian monarchs who ascended to the throne from the family ==
From Iskander ll's family, 4 Maldivian monarchs ascended to the Maldivian throne. it is Mohamed Imaaduddin ll, Ibrahim Iskander ll, Mukarram Imaaduddin, Muhammed Ghiya'as ud-din and Muhammad Mu'iz ud-din.

=== Mohamed Imaaduddin ===
Sultan Mudzhaffar Mohamed Imaduddine II was the sultan of the Maldives from 11 April 1705 to 11 October 1721. He reigned From Dhiyamigili dynasty. He was the son of Ibrahim Dhoshimeyna Thakurufaan and Amina Dhiyo, who was the ancestor of Iskander ll.

=== Iskander ll ===
Ibrahim Iskander ll was the sultan of the Maldives from 1721 to 1750, He ascended to the throne following his father Imaaduddin's Death in 1721. He also Reigned from the Dhiyamigili dynasty.

=== Ghiyasuddin l ===
Muhammed Ghiya'as ud-din was the sultan of the Maldives from January 19, 1767, until he was deposed by Muhammad Shamsuddeen II on December 12, 1773.

=== Muizuddine l ===
Muhammad Mu'iz ud-din was the sultan of the Maldives from 1774 until his death on September 13, 1779. Muizuddine became a member of the Iskander ll, family after the Marriage to Iskander's grand daughter, Aminath Didi.

Name	Reign	Born	Died	Consort	About
Imaaduddin ll	April 11, 1705 - October 11, 1721	1661 Malé	1774 Malé	Aminath Kanbaidhikilege.	He is the eldest child of Ibrahim Dhoshimeyna Thakurufaan & Amina Dhiyo. He is also a father of 2 Maldivian Monarch's, Iskander ll & Mukarram Imaaduddin lll.
Ibrahim Iskander ll	1720 - 1750	May 7, 1708 Malé	L. Gan	Aisha Kanbaafaanu.	He is the son of Imaaduddin ll & Aminath Kan'baidhikilege. He has 6 children. He is also the grandfather of queen consort Aminath Didi & great-grandfather of Princess Aisha Didi (Kakaagey Kalhu Goma).
Muhammed Ghiya'as ud-din	January 19, 1767 - December 12, 1773	Malé	October 7, 1774	Aminath Didi (sikka Aminath Manikfaan)	He the son of Iskander ll & Aisha kanbaafaanu. he was deposed by Muhammad Shamsuddeen II, the first monarch of Huraa dynasty. He has a son which is Prince Abdulla.
Muhammad Mu'iz ud-din	1774 - 1779	Malé	September 13, 1779	Aminath Didi (Dhonbeenaagey Amina Didi)	He was Married to Aminath Didi, the grand child of Iskander ll. He was the father of princess Aisha Rani Kilegefan (Kakaagey Kalhu Goma). Muizuddine was the son-in-law of Ibrahim Ranna Bandeyri kilegefan by the marriage of his daughter.

== Family history ==
=== Family connections ===
The Iskander ll Family is connected to the Huraa dynasty by Sultan Iskander's grand daughter, Aminath Didi's marriage to Huraa dynasty's king Muhammad Mu'iz ud-din. It is also connected to the Family of sultan Hassan Nooraddeen II, through the Marriage of sultan Iskander's Great-great-grandson, Kakaagey Ali Didi's marriage to Princess Zareena Nooradheen. Kakaagey Kalhu Goma (Princess Aisha Rani Kilegefan) is the granddaughter of Iskander ll. Sultan Iskander's Family is also connected to Meedhoo through Prince Abdulla's daughter, Princess Aisha Didi's marriage to Meedhoo Edhurugey Mohamed Thakurufaan. Princess Aisha Didi lived in Meedhoo until her death. She is buried is Kōgaṇṇu cemetery in Meedhoo. Prince Abdulla married 8 People and had 16 children. Princess Abdulla is buried in Fuvahmulah. Prince Abdulla and his father Muhammed Ghiya'as ud-din was banished to Fuvahmulah. When Prince Abdulla got banished He was 7 years old. After Prince Abdulla got banished to Fuvahmulah, he used to live in Fuvahumulah and married People From Fuvahmulah. Later he came to Meedhoo and married people of Meedhoo. Princess Aisha Didi's descendants are mostly in Meedhoo.

=== Family of Prince Abdulla ===
Family of Prince Abdulla
- Mohamed Dorhimeyna thakurufan
  - Ibrahim Dorhimeyna thakurufan
    - Mohamed Imaaduddin ll.
      - Ibrahim Iskander II
        - Muhammed Ghiya'as ud-din
          - Prince Abdulla
            - Princess Aisha Didi
            - Prince Moosa Didi
            - Muhammad Didi
            - Hassan Didi
            - Prince Ahmed Didi (Midu Gan'duvaru Ahmed Didi)
            - Princess Khadijah Didi (Midu Gan'duvaru Khadijah Didi)
            - Fathimath Didi
            - Hawwa Didi
            - Sanfa Didi
            - Musa Didi
            - Ibrahim Didi
            - Ali Didi
            - Hussain Didi
            - Abdullah Didi
            - Mariyam Didi
            - Ismail Didi
            - Aminath Didi

== Grandchildren of Prince Abdulla ==
=== First marriage ===
Marriage	Grandchild
Mariyam Manikfaan & Prince Abdulla	See List (Note: 1. Muhummad Didi son of Princess Aisha Didi & Ali Manikfaan; 2. Dhon Didi (Kon'dey Didi) daughter of princess Aisha Didi & Ali Manikfaan; 3. Ahmed Didi (Meedhoo Gan'duvaru Ahmed Didi Son of Princess Aisha Didi & Muhammad Thakurufan; 4. Khadeeja Didi Daughter of Princess Aisha Didi & Muhammad Thakurufan; 5. Aminath Didi Daughter of Princess Aisha Didi & Muhammad Thakurufan; 6. Hassan Didi Son of Princess Aisha Didi & Muhammad Thakurufan; 7. Ibrahim Didi Son of Prince Moosa Didi & Mariyam Manikfaan; 8. Aminath Didi Son of Prince Moosa Didi & Mariyam Manikfaan; 9. Muhummad Didi Son of Prince Moosa Didi & Mariyam Manikfaanu of gedharu)

=== Second marriage ===
Marriage	Grandchild
Aminath Manikfaan & Prince Abdulla	See List (Note: 1. Ahmad Didi Son of Muhammad Didi & Unknown; 2. Ali Didi Son of Muhammad Didi & Unknown; 3. Ali Didi (kudhu raniya'ge Ali Didi) Son of Hassan Didi & Fathimath Manikfaan; 4. Hussain Didi Son of Hassan Didi & Aminath Manikfaan; 5. Ibrahim Didi Son of Hassan Didi & Aminath Didi; 6. Ahmad Didi Son of Hassan Didi & Aminath Manikfaan of Mai-grdharo; 7. Ismail Didi Son of Hassan Didi & Aminath Manikfaan of Mai-grdharo; 8. Muhummed Didi Son of Hassan Didi & Aminath Manikfaan of Mai-grdharo; 9. Fathimath Didi Daughter of Hassan Didi & Aminath Manikfaan of Mai-grdharo; 10. Aishath Didi Daughter of Hassan Didi & Unknown; 11. Aminath Didi Daughter of Hassan Didi & Unknown; 12. Ali Didi Son of Ahamad Didi & Unknown; 13. Fathimath Didi Daughter of Ahamad Didi & Unknown; 14. Sanfaa Didi Daughter of Hawwa Didi & Unknown; 15. Dhon Didi Daughter of Hussain Didi & Unknown; 16. Ali Didi Son of Aminath Didi and Unknown; 17. Ibrahim Didi Son of Aminath Didi. He was the Last Grand child of Prince Abdulla)

== See also ==
- Ibrahim Iskander II
