= Prince Ibrahim, Faamuladheyri Kilegefaanu =

Maldivian heir apparent; son of Ghiyasuddin I (1764–1829)

- Crown prince of the Maldives; Kilegefaanu
- Born: Prince Abdullah; 1764
- Died: 4 June 1829 (aged 64–65); Fuvahmulah, Maldives
- Burial: Friday Mosque, Fuvahmulah
- Spouses: Kudeyraniya Edhurugey Mariyam Manikufaanu; Validhadi Amina Manikufaanu; Himithee Dhon Hawwa Manikufaanu; Hunubolie Sanfa Manikufaanu; Vinaaveyre Sanfa Manikufaanu; Bahaboakaleyge Fathima Manikufaanu; Malgandi Amina Manikufaanu; Miskimmagi Edhurugey Mariyam Manikufaanu
- Issue Detail: Edhurugey Aisha Didi; Edhurugey Amina Didi; Edhurugey Moosa Didi; Karayye Mohamed Didi; Karayye Hassan Didi; Karayye Ahmed Didi; Karayye Hawwa Didi; Karayye Khadeeja Didi; Karayye Dhon Didi; Himithee Ibrahim Didi; Himithee Thuththu Didi; Himithee Sanfa Didi; Hunubolie Hussain Didi; Hunubolie Ali Didi; Huruvadie Abdulla Didi; Dhoondigamu Mariyam Didi; Dhoondigamu Ismail Didi; Berimagu Amina Didi
Names
- Al-Ameer Ibrahim Faamuladheyri Kilegefaanu
- House: Dhiyamigili
- Father: Muhammad Ghiyasuddin I
- Mother: Queen Aminath Manikufaanu
- Religion: Muslim

Prince Ibrahim Faamuladheyri Kilegefaanu (born Prince Abdullah; 1764 – 4 June 1829) was the second son of Sultan Muhammad Ghiyasuddin I of the Dhiyamigili dynasty.

Prince Ibrahim was the son of Muhammad Ghiyasuddin I and Sikka Amina Manikufaanu. After protests over the assassination of his father Sultan Muhammad Ghiyasuddin, Prince Abdulla was exiled to Fuvahmulah as a kid, with some of his distant relatives from that island.

== Early life ==
Abdullah was born in 1764. His father was the eldest son of Ibrahim Iskander II. Abdullah was taken to Fuvahmulah, and taken care of by some of his distant relatives from that island.

=== Heir apparent and banishment ===
In 1766, Hassan Izzuddin I abdicated throne to Muhammad Ghiyasuddin I. Seven years into his father's reign, Prince Ibrahim's father left Malé for Mecca to perform Hajj pilgrimage. He appointed his sister, Amina Kabafaanu as dual regents. Four days after Ghiyasuddin departed, Ali Shah Bandar, husband of Amina Kanbafaan, decided to usurp the powers of Sultan for himself. The result was that Muhammed Manikufaan moved against Ali Shah Bandar and the outcome was Huraagey Muhammad Manikufaanu proclaimed himself as the Sultan, resulting in the young prince Abdulla and other royals from the Dhiyamigili dynasty getting banished to different islands of the Maldives.

== Titles ==
- Kilegefaan
- Ibrahim Faamuladheyri Kilegefan
- Didi

== Marriages and children ==
Prince Ibrahim married seven women from Fuvahmulah and one from Himithi Island in Faafu Atoll, fathering 18 children across these eight marriages. His first wife, Kudeyraniya Edhurugey Mariyam Manikufaanu, bore his eldest child, Aisha Didi (also known as "Dhoshee Didi"), along with Amina Didi and Moosa Didi; some debate exists over whether Hawwa Didi was from this union, though most sources attribute her to his second wife. His second marriage, to Validhadi Amina Manikfan (d. 1850), produced his eldest son, Mohamed Didi, who succeeded his father as the ruler of the southern three provinces, as well as Ahmed Didi, Hassan Didi, Hawwa Didi, Khadeeja Didi, and Dhon Didi. During his 1789 exile in Himithi, he married Himithee Dhon Hawwa Manikufaanu, fathering twins Ibrahim Didi and Thuththu Didi (born 1790) and Sanfa Didi. His fourth wife, Hunubolie Sanfa Manikufaanu (d. 1837), bore Hussain Didi and Ali Didi, while his fifth, Vinaaveyre Sanfa Manikufaanu, had Abdullah Didi. From Bahaboakaleyge Fathima Manikufaanu (d. 1864), he had Mariyam Didi and Ismail Didi, and his seventh wife, Malgandi Amina Manikfan, produced no children. His eighth and final marriage, to Miskiymagu Edhurugey Mariyam Manikfan, resulted in his youngest child, Aminath Didi (also known as "Berimagu Didi").

Though the marriages are listed here in chronological order, Prince Ibrahim had several wives concurrently until his death, leaving the birth order of most children unclear, with only Aisha Didi as the eldest, Mohamed Didi as the eldest son, and Aminath Didi as the youngest well-established in family tradition.

Originally named Abdullah at birth, Prince Ibrahim adopted the name Ibrahim in 1799 upon receiving the title Faamuladheyri Kilegefaanu, honoring his grandfather Sultan Ibrahim Iskandar II and his deceased elder brother Ibrahim, while signaling continuity; in his family, each heir was traditionally named after their father, ensuring a pattern like Ibrahim-Mohamed-Ibrahim. His son Ibrahim Didi, born in 1790 in Himithi, was named Ibrahim before this change, as it occurred prior to 1799.

== Ancestry ==
Ancestors of Prince Ibrahim, Faamuladheyri Kilegefaanu

8. Muhammad Imadudeen
4. Ibrahim Iskander II
9. Aminath kan'baidhikilege
2. Muhammad Ghiyasuddin I
10. Hassan Thakurufaan
5. Aisha Kan'baafaanu
11. Fathimath Kilegefaanu
1. Abdulla, Crown Prince of the Maldives
12. Unknown
6. Unknown
13. Unknown
3. Aminath Manikufaanu
14. Unknown
7. Unknown
15. Unknown
