= Ibrahim Ali Didi =

Prime Minister of the Maldives from 1954 to 1957

The Honourable Ibrahim Ali Didi
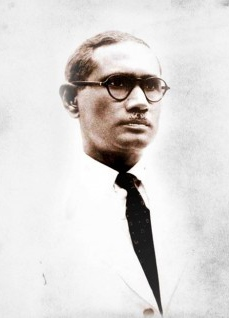
- Didi in 1989

7th Prime Minister of the Maldives
- In office 11 March 1954 – 11 December 1957
- Monarch: Mohamed Fareed I
- Preceded by: Mohamed Amin Didi
- Succeeded by: Ibrahim Nasir

Personal details
- Born: June 11, 1889 Eggamuge, Fura Malé, Sultanate of the Maldive Islands
- Died: January 10, 1975 (aged 85) Eggamuge, Malé, Maldives
- Spouse(s): Princess Gulistan Imaduddine; Aminiath Mohamed Didi (Note: Others, Unknown names)
- Children: Fathimath Ibrahim Didi, Jameela Ibrahim Didi, Aishath Ibrahim Didi and Khadheeja Ibrahim Didi
- Parents: Ali Didi of Eggamugē; Sitti of Velidugē
- Education: S. Thomas' College; Al-Azhar University

Ibrahim Ali Didi (Ibrahim Fāmudhēri Kilegefān; 11 June 1889 – 10 January 1975) was a Maldivian statesman, diplomat and politician who served as Prime Minister of the Maldive Islands from 1954 until his resignation on 11 December 1957. He also served as Speaker of the People's Majlis from 1944 to 1945 and Ambassador of Ceylon.

Ibrahim Ali Didi, later known by his title, Ibrahim Fāmudhēri Kilegefān was born and raised in Fura Malé. commonly known as Eggamugē Ibrahim Fāmudhēri Kilegefān or Tuttu Ali Didi ge Seedi, was son of Ali Didi (Tuttu Ali Didi) and his wife, Sitti of Velidugē. He served several ministerial positions, Minister of Endowments, Minister of Health, Minister of Interior, Minister of Education and Minister of Finance.

Kilegefān's tenure as prime minister stands out as one of the most remarkable in Maldivian history. He was appointed as prime minister by His Majesty, King Muhammad Fareedul Awwal. During his premiership, he kept close relations with the British and during the first month of his premirship, the British Empire and Kilegefān signed an agreement to give Gan in Addu Atoll to british for 100 years. His cabinet minister, Ibrahim Nasir was against him and started an anti-campaign. Following this, a committee was established by royal decree to investigate the affairs of Prime Minister Kilegefān's administration. After thorough examination, the committee recommended that the king request Prime Minister Kilegefān to resign for health reasons. Upon Kilegefān's resignation on December 11, 1957, Nasir was appointed as the new prime minister. Subsequently, under Nasir's leadership, the Maldive Islands gained independence.

When he resigned as prime minister upon the recommendation of the sultan, it began to end his political life. Although he faced significant issues during his political life, he completed several ministerial and political positions. Kilegefān married 5 women and had four children, first child, Fathimath Ibrahim Didi with Princess Gulistan Imaduddine, daughter of King Muhammad Imaduddine VI. The three other children, Jameela Ibrahim Didi, Princess Aishath Ibrahim Didi (Maandoogey Titti Goma) and Khadheeja Ibrahim Didi were born to his other wives. Kilegefan was awarded the Fāmudhēri Kilegefān title, the then–highest title in the Maldive Islands on 22 April 1946. He was a descendant from the Maldivian political family, Eggamuge.

== Early life, family and education ==
Ibrahim Ali Didi was born on 11 June 1889, the child of Eggamuge Tuttu Ali Didi and Sitti of Velidooge (Muleegey Tuttu Didi ge Sitti). His father, Ali Didi was the son of Hassan Famuladheyri Kilegefan of Eggamuge. He was delivered at Eggamuge in Fura Malé. Kilegefan used his Father's name in his last name "Ali Didi".

During the first reign of Muhammad Mueenuddeene II, his grandfather Hassan Faamudheyri Kilegefan was appointed as a Member of the King's Consultative Assembly in 1887. Kilegefān's father was the brother of Queen Umm Kulthoum Didi, Consort of King Muhammad Imaduddine VI.

=== Marriages ===
Ibrahim Ali Didi married five people. first marriage to his cousin, Princess Gulistan Imaduddine, daughter of his aunt, Queen Umm Kulthoum Didi and King Muhammad Imaduddine VI. They got a daughter, Princess Fathimath Ibrahim Didi (Tuttu Goma). Goma was the Speaker of the Senate of the Maldive Islands and was a member of the Senate. During Kilegefān's premiership, he was married to Aminath Mohamed Didi from Fura Malé. His other daughter, Jameela was married to Ahmed Shathir, who was a Speaker of the People's Majlis and scholar.

Father to two princesses, Ibrahim Ali Didi had four children, Princess Fathimath Ibrahim Didi (Tuttu Goma), Jameela Ibrahim Didi, Princess Aishath Ibrahim Didi (Mandoogey Titti Goma and Khadheeja Ibrahim Didi.

=== Education ===
After receiving his primary education in Fura Malé, he completed his higher education at St. Thomas' College in Ceylon, India and Jamiat al-Azhar in Cairo, Egypt. He was fluent in Arabic, Urdu and English, and was a leading physician in history and medicine. Among the various sciences, he knew agriculture and laughter at a high level. He is also aware of the benefits of the Qur'an. He was the first master of cricket to be established in the Maldive Islands.

The period was a time of conflict between the Athireege and the Eggamuge families in the politics of Maldive Islands. At that time, Tuttu Ali Didi, Ibrahim Ali Didi's father was exiled to Huraa Island for political reasons. Ibrahim Ali Didi, aged about 15, returned to Fura Malé from Ceylon while studying. As a result of his father's banishment to Huraa, he had no means to return to Colombo.

Ali Didi requested from then–Prime Minister Athireegey Ibrahim Dhoshimeyna Kilegefan, the grandfather of Mohamed Amin Didi, to return to Ceylon to study. However, the Prime Minister responded,

Even if my children learn English, Tuttu Ali Didi's (Ibrahim Ali Didi's father) children cannot learn or know English.

Ibrahim Ali Didi was disheartened by the Prime Minister's response but remained determined to pursue his studies in Ceylon. Undeterred by the official denial, he resolved to find a way to reach Ceylon without the government's knowledge.

His uncle, Eggamuge Abdullah Didi, was also exiled, and his boat was also sent to Huraa with him. Young Ibrahim Ali Didi traveled to Huraa, where he discovered his elder brother's boat (Odi) in the sea. With the assistance of a group of young men from Huraa, he worked to dry the boat and prepare it for the voyage to Ceylon.

Ibrahim Ali Didi made all necessary arrangements to secretly sail from the boat. He was encouraged by Daravandhooge Moosa Didi, close fried of Ali Didi's father and the father of Hussain Salahuddin. Moosa Didi also provided the travel equipment needed for the journey. After preparing the boat in Huraa, Ibrahim Ali Didi set sail for Ceylon with his father and elder brother. Within two days, the boat successfully entered the port of Ceylon.

After entering the port of Colombo, Ibrahim Ali Didi first headed to the British Governor's office. There, he explained the situation in the Maldive Islands and requested protection. The British in Ceylon were already aware of the family feud in the political scene of the Maldives. Consequently, Ibrahim Ali Didi received the protection he sought from the British. Ibrahim Ali Didi began his education in Cornwall under British protection. After completing his studies, he returned to Malé.

== Premiership ==
Following the restoration of the Sultanate of the Maldive Islands in 1954, Ibrahim Ali Didi was appointed the 7th prime minister of the Maldive Islands on 11 March 1954.

Throughout his premiership, Ibrahim Ali Didi maintained close ties with the British. Within the first month of assuming office, a significant agreement was reached between the British Empire and Kilegefān, granting Gan in Addu Atoll to the British Empire for a period of 100 years. However, dissent brewed within his administration as his cabinet minister, Ibrahim Nasir, opposed this move and launched an anti-campaign.

In response to the growing tension, a committee was formed by royal decree to investigate the activities of Prime Minister Kilegefān's government. After a thorough examination, the committee recommended that the king request Prime Minister Kilegefān's resignation citing health reasons. Consequently, Kilegefān resigned from his position on December 11, 1957. Ibrahim Nasir was then appointed as the new Prime Minister. Under Nasir's leadership, the Maldives eventually gained independence, marking a significant milestone in the nation's history.

== Political career ==
Ibrahim Ali Didi began his public service as a key figure in establishing a legitimate government in the Maldives. Upon the formation of the new government, he assumed roles such as Minister of Health and Minister of Endowments. Additionally, he held positions including Member of Parliament, Speaker of Parliament, Representative of the Dhivehi State in Sri Lanka, Member of the Executive Council, and Member of the Crown Committee. Eventually, he resigned from the position of Prime Minister of the Maldives, after which he became the state advisor. He was crowned the Faamudheyri Kilegefan title on 10 Jumadul Ula 1365H.

Ibrahim Ali Didi played a pivotal role in establishing the Education Fund of the Maldives and introducing the Compulsory Education Act. Renowned for his fearlessness in expressing his opinions during political turmoil, he was widely respected by the people. As a legal expert, he contributed significantly to upholding the Constitution of the country. He remained committed to public service in the field of medicine until his passing.

During the motor boat dispute (The Motorboat Revolt) following the passage of the Constitution, Ibrahim Ali Didi was initially sent to Colombo, then exiled to Thoddoo. Despite these challenges, he maintained his dedication to public service and was eventually granted membership in the Parliament.

Throughout his career, Ibrahim Ali Didi held significant positions within the government, particularly during Mohamed Amin Didi's administration. He served as Minister of Interior multiple times and represented B.A. as a Member of Parliament. He was also elected as a member of the Crown Committee following the resignation of King Hassan Nooraddeene II. Furthermore, he also served as the Representative of the Maldives in Ceylon.

A close associate of Mohamed Amin Didi, he played a crucial role in the government. Despite not holding any position in the first Republican government, he assumed leadership following a change in government on the 21 August 1953.
