= Fathimath Ibrahim Didi =

Member of the Royal Family of the Maldives

Fathimath Ibrahim Didi ފާޠިމަތު އިބްރާހީމް ދީދީ
- Tuttu Goma
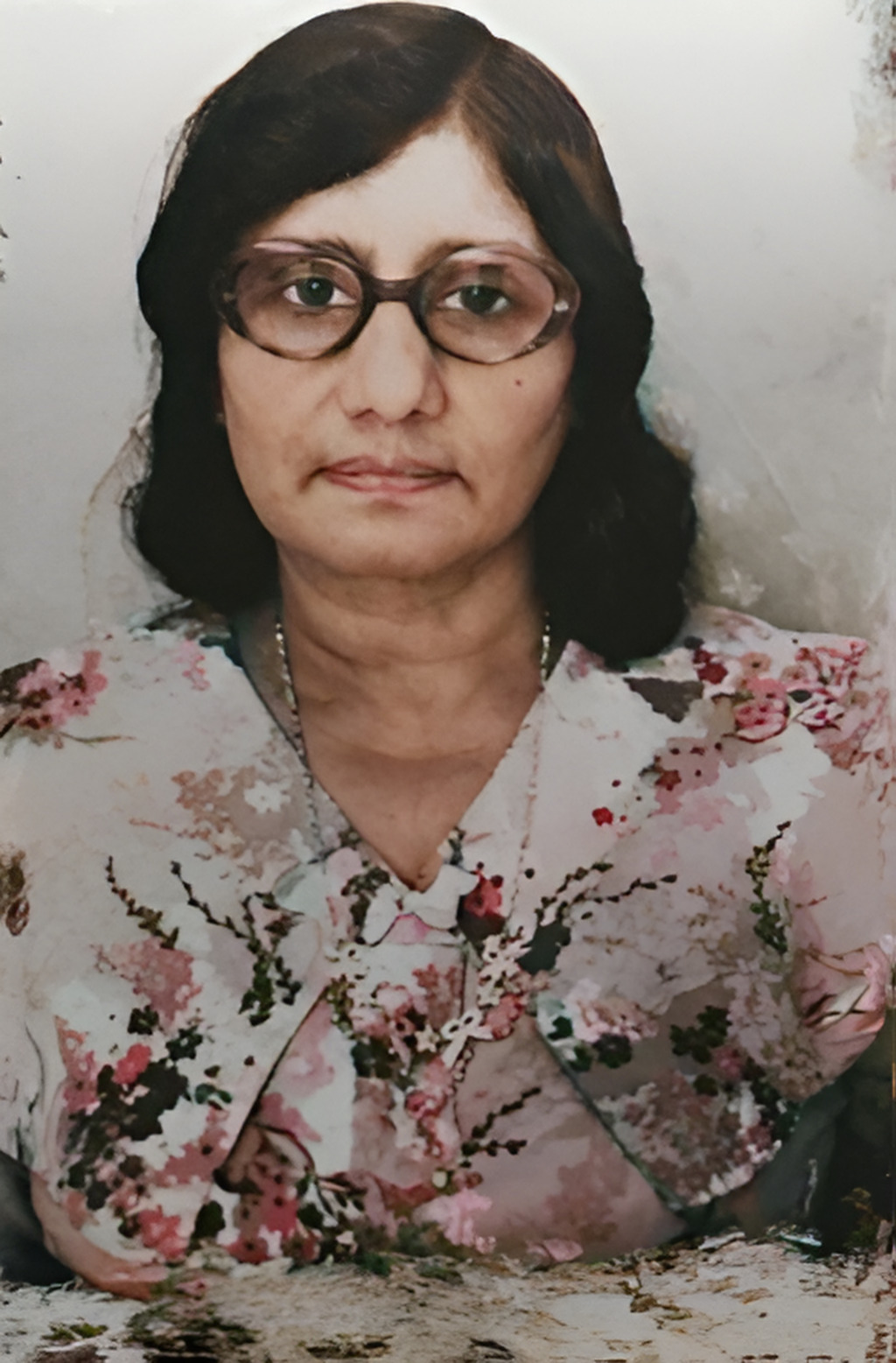

Spouse of the Prime Minister of the Maldives
- In office 1 August 1972 – 6 March 1975
- Prime Minister: Ahmed Zaki
- Preceded by: Naseema Mohamed
- Succeeded by: Office abolished

Speaker of the Senate of the Maldives
- In office 22 December 1952 – 1 January 1954
- President: Mohamed Amin Didi
- Born: Tuttu Goma; 1918; Henveiru, Malé, Kaafu Atoll, Maldives
- Died: 5 February 2008 (aged 90); Indira Gandhi Memorial Hospital
- Spouse: Ahmed Zaki
- Issue: Ismail Shafeeu
- Father: Ibrahim Ali Didi
- Mother: Princess Gulistan Imaduddin

Princess/Al Nabeela Fathimath Ibrahim Didi (Dhivehi: ފާޠިމަތު އިބްރާހީމް ދީދީ; 1918 – 5 February 2008) was a member of the royal family of Maldives. She served as the Speaker of the Senate of the Maldives, During the presidency of President Amin Didi, Goma was the first female minister of the Maldives.

== Life ==
Goma was born in Malé, as the grand child of King Muhammad Imaduddine VI. Her mother, Princess Gulistan Imaduddine was the daughter of Sultan Muhammad Imaduddine VI. Goma's grandfather ascended to the throne as King of the Maldive Islands from 1893, following the abdication of Muhammad Shamsuddeen III. Imaduddine was deposed after he went to Egypt to marry Sharifa Hanim. Princess Goma was offered the crown of the Maldives in 1953 at the end of President Amin's presidency, however refused it after hearing of objections from the clergy.

When First Republic of the Maldives was abolished and the Sultanate was restored on 7 March 1954, four days after Princess Fathimath Ibrahim Didi's father, Ibrahim Ali Didi of Eggamugē (Ibrahim Fāmudhēri Kilegefān) was appointed as the Prime Minister of the Maldives on 11 March 1954, he remained as Prime Minister until his resignation due to health issues on December 11, 1957.

Fathimath Ibrahim Didi Married the Maldivian politician, prime minister Ahmed Zaki in the 1950s. they had a son, Ismail Shafeeu had several Ministerial positions, Minister of Defence and Minister of Tourism.

== Early life, family, and education ==
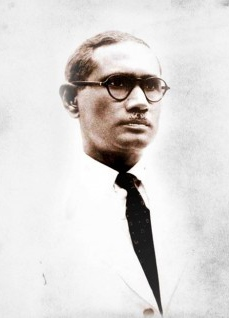
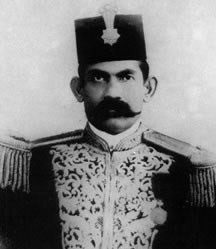
Goma's father (L) and grandfather (R)

Princess Tuttu Goma was born on 1918, the first child of Princess Gulistan Imaduddine and her husband, Ibrahim Fāmudhēri Kilegefān. Gulistan's mother was the daughter of King Muhammad Imaduddine VI and Umm Kulthoum Didi of Eggamugē. By birth, the Princess was given the name "Princess Tuttu Goma", however, her last name was bestowed upon her from her father's name, "Ibrahim Didi" (Ibrahim Ali Didi).

Fathimath had three siblings, Jameela Ibrahim Didi was born on 1931, Aishath Ibrahim Didi (Titti Goma) and Khadeeja Ibrahim Didi. Fathimath was privately home–educated. In addition to her fluency in Dhivehi, she was recognized for her proficiency in Arabic and Sinhalese.

After the bloodless coup on attempt to Mohamed Amin Didi's assassination, the president was forced to step down as President of Maldives by attacking him of h. 24 Jumad-al-awwal 1373. following the attack, the Vice President became the Acting President. Before the acting president's government was over, it was discussed between princess Fathimath Ibrahim's father, Ibrahim Fāmudhēri Kilegefān and acting president, Velaanaagey Ibrahim Muhammad Didi to appoint her as the Queen of the Maldive Islands. However after clerics headed by Abdulla Jalalud-din, she refused to take the throne and the position was passed to Muhammad Fareed Didi.

== Death ==
Didi died on 5 February 2008, at the age of 90, at Indira Gandhi Memorial Hospital. The flag of the Maldives was flown half-mast following her death.

== Ancestry ==
Ancestors of Fathimath Ibrahim Didi

8. Hassan Fāmudhēri Kilegefān
4. Ali Didi
9. Fathimath Didi
2. Ibrahim Ali Didi
10. Hassan Thakurufaan
5. Sitti of Velidugē
11. Fathimath Kilegefaanu
1. Princess Fathimath Ibrahim Didi
12. Prince Hassan Izzuddeen
6. Muhammad Imaduddine VI
13. Don Didi of Maandoogē
3. Princess Gulistan Imaduddine
14. Hassan Fāmudhēri Kilegefān
7. Queen Umm Kulthoum Didi
15. Fathimath Didi
