= Sharifa Ismail =

Member of Maldivian Royal Family

Princess Sharifa Ismail (1 January 1942 - 20 June 1964) was a member of Maldivian Royal Family. She was the eldest daughter of Prince Ismail Ali (Kokkoge Ismail) and Princess Aiminath Mohamed Didi (kaanlo) Both descendants of Dhiyamigili Dynasty.

== Family ==
Princess Sharifa married to Sheikh Ibrahim Hassan in 1954 and had four children:

- Princess Fathimath Raziyya (1955-1955)
- Princess Aiminath Rahma (1957-
- Princess Aishath Rameeza (1961-
- Princess Maryam Masroora (1964-

== Death ==
Princess Sharifa died after giving birth to Princess Masroora on June 20, 1964. She is buried in Maafanu cemetery.
