= Muhammad VI =

Muhammad VI may refer to:

- Muhammad Imaaduddeen VI (1868–1932), sultan of the Maldives from 1893 to 1902
- Mehmed VI (1861–1926), sultan of Ottoman Empire, from 1918 to 1922
- Mohammed VI of Morocco (born 1963), King of Morocco since 1999
