= Amina Kabafaanu =

Amina I of the Maldives
- Sultana of the Land and Sea, Lady of the Twelve-Thousand-Islands, Sultana of the Maldives
- Reign: Maldives: 1753–1754 (as monarch); Maldives: 1773–1774 (as regent)
- Predecessor: Muhammad Imaaduddeen III (First reign)
- Successor: Amina II
- Born: 2 February 1724; Malé, the capital of Maldives
- Died: after 1774; Hulhiyandhoo Island
- Spouse: Ali Shahbandar
Names
- Amina bint Sultan Ibrahim Iskandhar II
- Dynasty: Dhiyamigili Dynasty
- Father: Sultan Ibrahim Iskandar II of Maldives
- Mother: Aisha Manikfan

Amina I of the Maldives also called Amina Kabafaanu and Aminath Kabafan (2 February 1724 – died after 1773), was sultana regnant of the Maldives from 1753 until 1754. She also served as joint regent with her spouse Ali Shah Bandar Vela’ana’a Manikufa’anu in 1773 during the pilgrimage of her brother Sultan Muhammed Ghiya'as ud-din to Mecca.

== Life ==
Amina was the eldest daughter of Sultan Ibrahim Iskandar II of the Maldives (r. 1721–1750) and Aisha Manikfan, and the sister of Sultan Muhammed Ghiya'as ud-din. In September 1743, she married Ali Shah Bandar Vela’ana’a Manikufa’anu, son of Addu Ali Thakurufan.

In 1750, her father died and was succeeded by her paternal uncle, Sultan Muhammad Imaduddin III (d. 1757). In 1752, he was taken captive by the Ali Raja of Cannanore and imprisoned in Kavaratti island in the Laccadives, and Malé was occupied by the Malabars of Cannanore. After 17 weeks of occupation, Malé was freed from the Malabars by Muleegey Dom Hassan Maniku, also called Hassan Manikfan.

=== First rule ===
When Malé was freed, Amina was installed as monarch. Her ascension to the throne was neither rejected nor challenged:

"Aminath Kabafan, the daughter of King Ibrahim became the leader, and she ruled the Maldives with Hassan Manikfan. Everyone agreed to this arrangement."

In 1754, Amina abdicated in favor of her nine-year-old cousin Amina Rani Kilegefa’anu, daughter of the imprisoned former sultan, with Muleegey Hassan Manikfaan as regent. The reason given for her abdication has been the plots orchestrated by the opposition to her de facto co-regent, Muleegey Hassan Manikfaan, as well as trouble over her debts to the French trader Monsieur Le Termellier.

=== Exile ===
After her abdication, Amina retired to Hithadoo Island on the Addu Atoll with her spouse, Ali Manikfan. Even in her absence, she was considered a viable threat to the regime, being the eldest daughter of Sultan Ibrahim Iskandar II. Her four younger sisters were not given roles of significance in governing, despite being married to high-ranking men with titles. She was apparently trained in warfare and even initiated an attempt to rally support for her claim.

Warned by travelers from Malé that there were plans for their arrest, they left for Minicoy with three armed ships. When the news of their trip to Minicoy reached Malé, an expedition led by Umar Manik, brother of Hassan Manikfan, were sent to arrest them. After a battle near Kelaa island channel, Amina and her ship was defeated and captured, and she was brought back to Malé with her spouse. They were exiled to Fenfushi island in September 1754.

In 1759, her niece Queen Amina II was deposed and succeeded by her uncle Hasan 'Izz ud-din who ascended after hearing news of Sultan Muhammad Imaduddin III's demise to fill the throne in the absence of the Dhiyamigili heir to throne Muhammad Ghiyath al-Din, who was held captive by Ali Raja.

=== Second rule ===
Hasan 'Izz ud-din abdicated the throne to Sultan Muhammad Ghiyath al-Din on his return.

On 17 December 1773, her brother, Sultan Muhammed Ghiya'as ud-din left for the Hajj pilgrimage to Mecca in the company of his spouse, Minister Ali Hakura Manikfan and Minister Ali Doshimeyna Manikfan. He appointed his sister Amina to administer the affairs of state as regent in his absence, jointly with her spouse Ali Velana Manikfan.

During their regency, however, a coup took place and the followers around Amina's husband Ali Velana Manikfan deposed her absent brother and had him proclaimed monarch. They were declared rebels by the loyalists of the absent king and soon deposed by a countercoup, and Muhammad Shamsuddeen II was placed on the throne. Amina and her spouse were arrested and expelled to Huliyandhoo Island on Laamu Atoll, where they eventually died.

Preceded by Mohamed Imaduddeen III	Sultan of the Maldives; 1753–1754	Succeeded by Amina II
