= Senate of the Maldives =

Upper house of parliament of the Maldives (1953–1954)

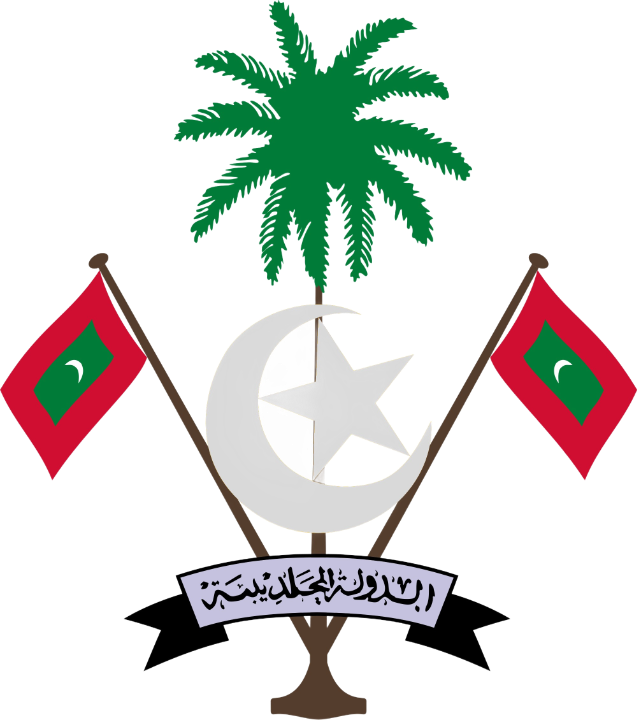

Type
- Type: Upper house
- Houses: Senate; House of People

History
- Founded: January 1953
- Disbanded: January 1954
- Preceded by: Unicameral Majlis
- Succeeded by: Unicameral Majlis

Leadership
- President: Fatima Ibrahim Didi; 1953-1954
- Seats: 18

The Senate of the Maldives was the upper house of parliament in the Maldives during the First Republic of the Maldives.

The republican constitution was adopted on 1 January 1953. It introduced a bicameral parliament including Senate as upper chamber and House of People as lower chamber. Mohamed Amin Didi was elected as the first president.

The Senate had 18 members. Nine members were elected by the House of People and nine members were appointed by the President of the Maldives. Fatima Ibrahim Didi was the President of the Senate.

The republican constitution was abolished on 5 January 1954. A subsequent referendum in January 1954 reintroduced Sultanate of the Maldives and a unicameral parliament.
