= ISO 3166-2:MV =

Entry for Maldives in ISO 3166-2

ISO 3166-2:MV is the entry for Maldives in ISO 3166-2, part of the ISO 3166 standard published by the International Organization for Standardization (ISO), which defines codes for the names of the principal subdivisions (e.g., provinces or states) of all countries coded in ISO 3166-1.

Currently for Maldives, ISO 3166-2 codes are defined for two cities and 19 administrative atolls.

Each code consists of two parts, separated by a hyphen. The first part is MV, the ISO 3166-1 alpha-2 code of Maldives. The second part is one of the following:

- three letters: Malé
- two digits: Addu City and administrative atolls

== Current codes ==
Subdivision names are listed as in the ISO 3166-2 standard published by the ISO 3166 Maintenance Agency (ISO 3166/MA).

ISO 639-1 codes are used to represent subdivision names in the following administrative languages:

- (dv): Dhivehi
- (en): English

Click on the button in the header to sort each column.

Code	Subdivision name (dv)	Local variant	Subdivision name (dv) (Note: For reference only, Dhivehi name in Dhivehi script not included in the ISO 3166-2 standard.)	Subdivision name (en)	Subdivision category
MV-01	Addu	Seenu	އައްޑޫ	Addu City	City
MV-00	Ariatholhu Dhekunuburi	Alifu Dhaalu	އަރިއަތޮޅު ދެކުނުބުރި	South Ari Atoll	Administrative atoll
MV-02	Ariatholhu Uthuruburi	Alifu Alifu	އަރިއަތޮޅު އުތުރުބުރި	North Ari Atoll	Administrative atoll
MV-03	Faadhippolhu	Lhaviyani	ފާދިއްޕޮޅު	Faadhippolhu	Administrative atoll
MV-04	Felidheatholhu	Vaavu	ފެލިދެ އަތޮޅު	Felidhu Atoll	Administrative atoll
MV-29	Fuvammulah	Gnaviyani	ފުވައްމުލައް	Fuvammulah	Administrative atoll
MV-05	Hahdhunmathi	Laamu	ހައްދުންމަތި	Hahdhunmathi	Administrative atoll
MV-28	Huvadhuatholhu Dhekunuburi	Gaafu Dhaalu	ހުވަދުއަތޮޅު ދެކުނުބުރި	South Huvadhu Atoll	Administrative atoll
MV-27	Huvadhuatholhu Uthuruburi	Gaafu Alifu	ހުވަދުއަތޮޅު އުތުރުބުރި	North Huvadhu Atoll	Administrative atoll
MV-08	Kolhumadulu	Thaa	ކޮޅުމަޑުލު	Kolhumadulu	Administrative atoll
MV-MLE	Maale		މާލެ	Male	City
MV-26	Maaleatholhu	Kaafu	މާލެ އަތޮޅު	Male Atoll	Administrative atoll
MV-20	Maalhosmadulu Dhekunuburi	Baa	މާޅޮސްމަޑުލު ދެކުނުބުރި	South Maalhosmadulu	Administrative atoll
MV-13	Maalhosmadulu Uthuruburi	Raa	މާޅޮސްމަޑުލު އުތުރުބުރި	North Maalhosmadulu	Administrative atoll
MV-25	Miladhunmadulu Dhekunuburi	Noonu	މިލަދުންމަޑުލު ދެކުނުބުރި	South Miladhunmadulu	Administrative atoll
MV-24	Miladhunmadulu Uthuruburi	Shaviyani	ޝާވިޔަނި އަތޮޅުގައެވެ	North Miladhunmadulu	Administrative atoll
MV-12	Mulakatholhu	Meemu	މުލަކަތޮޅު	Mulaku Atoll	Administrative atoll
MV-17	Nilandheatholhu Dhekunuburi	Dhaalu	ނިލަންދެއަތޮޅު ދެކުނުބުރި	South Nilandhe Atoll	Administrative atoll
MV-14	Nilandheatholhu Uthuruburi	Faafu	ނިލަންދެއަތޮޅު އުތުރުބުރި	North Nilandhe Atoll	Administrative atoll
MV-23	Thiladhunmathee Dhekunuburi	Haa Dhaalu	ތިލަދުންމަތީ ދެކުނުބުރި	South Thiladhunmathi	Administrative atoll
MV-07	Thiladhunmathee Uthuruburi	Haa Alifu	ތިލަދުންމަތީ އުތުރުބުރި	North Thiladhunmathi	Administrative atoll

== Changes ==
The following changes to the entry have been announced by the ISO 3166/MA since the first publication of ISO 3166-2 in 1998. ISO stopped issuing newsletters in 2013.

Newsletter	Date issued	Description of change in newsletter	Code/Subdivision change
Newsletter II-3	2011-12-13 (corrected 2011-12-15)	Administrative re-organization, addition of local generic administrative terms, language adjustment and source list update.	Subdivisions added: 7 provinces MV-00 Alifu Dhaalu
Online Browsing; Platform (OBP)	2016-11-15	Change of spelling of MV-05	Spelling change: MV-05
Online Browsing; Platform (OBP)	2018-11-26	Change of spelling in div of MV-00, MV-02, MV-04, MV-14, MV-17, MV-26, MV-27, MV-28; Change of spelling in eng of MV-00, MV-01, MV-02, MV-03, MV-04, MV-05, MV-07, MV-08, MV-12, MV-13, MV-14, MV-17, MV-20, MV-23, MV-24, MV-25, MV-26, MV-27, MV-28, MV-29; Addition of local variation of MV-00, MV-01, MV-02, MV-03, MV-04, MV-05, MV-07, MV-08, MV-12, MV-13, MV-14, MV-17, MV-20, MV-23, MV-24, MV-25, MV-26, MV-27, MV-28, MV-29; Change of category name from capital to city for MV-MLE; Change of category name from administrative atoll to city for MV-01; Removal of parent subdivision of MV-MLE, MV-00, MV-01, MV-02, MV-03, MV-04, MV-05, MV-07, MV-08, MV-12, MV-13, MV-14, MV-17, MV-20, MV-23, MV-24, MV-25, MV-26, MV-27, MV-28, MV-29; Deletion of provinces MV-CE, MV-NC, MV-NO, MV-SC, MV-SU, MV-UN and MV-US; Update List Source	Subdivisions deleted: MV-CE Central; MV-NC North Central; MV-NO North; MV-SC South Central; MV-SU South; MV-UN Upper North; MV-US Upper South; Category changes: MV-MLE capital → city MV-01 administrative atoll → city Spelling changes (dv): MV-00 Ari Atholhu Dhekunuburi → Ariatholhu Dhekunuburi; MV-02 Ari Atholhu Uthuruburi → Ariatholhu Uthuruburi; MV-04 Ari Atholhu Uthuruburi → Felidheatholhu; MV-14 Ari Atholhu Uthuruburi → Nilandheatholhu Uthuruburi; MV-17 Nilandhe Atholhu Dhekunuburi → Nilandheatholhu Dhekunuburi; MV-26 Maale Atholhu → MV-27 → Maaleatholhu; MV-28 Huvadhu Atholhu Dhekunuburi → Huvadhuatholhu Dhekunuburi; Spelling changes (en): MV-00 Alifu Dhaalu → South Ari Atoll; MV-01 Seenu → Addu City; MV-02 Alifu Alifu → North Ari Atoll; MV-03 Lhaviyani → Faadhippolhu; MV-04 Vaavu → Felidhu Atoll; MV-05 Laamu → Felidhu Atoll; MV-07 Haa Alifu → North Thiladhunmathi; MV-08 Thaa → Kolhumadulu; MV-12 Meemu → Mulaku Atoll; MV-13 Raa → Mulaku Atoll; MV-14 Faafu → North Nilandhe Atoll; MV-17 Dhaalu → South Nilandhe Atoll; MV-20 Baa → South Nilandhe Atoll; MV-23 Haa Dhaalu → South Thiladhunmathi; MV-24 Shaviyani → North Miladhunmadulu; MV-25 Noonu → South Miladhunmadulu; MV-26 Kaafu → South Miladhunmadulu; MV-27 Gaafu Alifu → North Huvadhu Atoll; MV-28 Gaafu Dhaalu → North Huvadhu Atoll; MV-29 Gnaviyani → Fuvammulah; Local variants added: all subdivisions

=== Former provinces ===
Provinces were abolished in 2010 and their codes removed in 2018:

Former code	Subdivision name (en)	Subdivision name (dv)
MV-CE	Central	Medhu
MV-NO	North	Uthuru
MV-NC	North Central	Medhu-Uthuru
MV-SU	South	Dhekunu
MV-SC	South Central	Medhu-Dhekunu
MV-UN	Upper North	Mathi-Uthuru
MV-US	Upper South	Mathi-Dhekunu

== See also ==
- Subdivisions of the Maldives
- FIPS region codes of Maldives
