= Muhammad Mueenuddeen II =

Sultan of the Maldives

Muhammad Mueenuddeen II Iskander
- Sultan of the Land and Sea, Lord of the Twelve-Thousand-Islands, Sultan of the Maldives
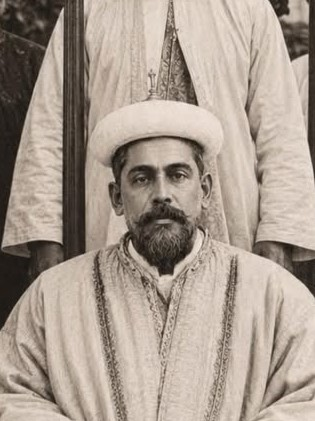
- Siri Kula Sundhura Kathiri Bavana Maharaadhun; enhanced photo based on an original B/W photo taken in December 1887

Sultan of the Maldives
- Reign: 1886–1888
- Predecessor: Sultan Ibrahim Nooraddeen
- Successor: Sultan Ibrahim Nooraddeen
- Born: Malé, Maldives
- Died: 23 September 1892
- Burial: Malé Friday Mosque
- Spouse: Kalhiharuge Dhon Didi
- Issue: Sultan Hassan Nooraddeen II HRH Prince Eggamugey Thuththu Manippulhu
- House: Muleege
- House: Maandhooge
- Dynasty: Huraa Dynasty
- Father: Al-Ameer Hassan Izzuddine (aka Maandhoogey Bodu Dhoshy Manippulhu)
- Mother: Aishath Didi (Handheygirigey Dhon Didi)
- Religion: Islam

Muhammad Mueenuddeen II (Arabic: محمد معين الدين الثاني; Dhivehi: މުހައްމަދު މުއީނުއްދީން ދެވަނަ އެވެ) was the sultan of the Maldives from 1886 to 1888. On 16th of December of 1887, he accepted British protection and the country became a British protectorate within the British Empire while retaining the local monarchy.

Preceded by Ibrahim Nooraddeen	Sultan of the Maldives; 1886–1888	Succeeded by Ibrahim Nooraddeen
