= Muhammed Ghiya'as ud-din =

Sultan of Maldives

Sultan Muhammed Ghiya'as ud-din
- Sultan of the Maldives

King of the Maldive Islands
- Reign: 1 February 1767 – 5 October 1773
- Coronation: 20 September 1767
- Predecessor: Sultan of the Maldives (Hasan 'Izz ud-din)
- Successor: Sultan of the Maldives (Muhammad Shamsuddeen II)
- Born: 15 June 1710; Malé, Maldives
- Died: 7 October 1773 (aged 63); Malé, Maldives
- Spouse: Aminath Manikufaanu (Piri)
- Issue: Prince Abdulla (Ibrahim Faamuladheyri Kilegefan)
Names
- Muhammed Manikufaanu
- House: Dhiyamigili
- Father: Ibrahim Iskander II
- Mother: Aisha Kan'baafaanu
- Religion: Islam

Muhammed Ghiya'as ud-din (Muhammed Manikufaanu; 15 June 1710 – 7 October 1774), the son of Sultan Ibrahim Iskandar II, was the sultan of the Maldives from 1767 to 1773. As per the will of his predecessor Dhon Bandaarain, Muhammed Manifufaanu ascended the throne and reigned as Sultan Al-Haj Muhammed Ghiya'as ud-din Iskandar Sri Kula Sundara Maha Radun. He was the last sultan of the Dhiyamigili Dynasty; he was deposed while away on a pilgrimage, and later, on his return trip he drowned, or was murdered by Muhammad Shamsuddeen II.

== Biography ==
The Sultan Muhammed Ghiya'as ud-din's reign was beset with many domestic troubles, which were coupled with a number of attacks by Malabars. The internal troubles were disputes that emerged between the Sultan and the family of Dhon Bandaarain. The Sultan was the son of Sultan Ibrahim Iskandhar II of the Dhiyamigili dynasty. Dhon Bandaarain was the first Sultan of the Huraage Dynasty. Therefore, Dhon Bandaarain's family was unhappy that the throne had by-passed them and had gone to the Dhiyamigili Dynasty. The leader of the disaffected group was Dhon Bandaarain's nephew, Muhammed Manikufaan, who was the son of Dhon Bandaarain's brother, Hussain Bodu Dhoshimeyna Kilegefaan. The result of this squabbling was that Dhon Bandaarain's family members were penalised. Muhammed Manikufaan and Dhon Bandaarain's sons were banished to different islands. Other members of the family were also banished. Although Dhon Bandaarain had treated Ghiyaasuddin with kindness, the new Sultan was denied the opportunity of reciprocating the same sentiments to the Huraage family. The attacks by the Malabars during this period were defeated by the Maldivians. The Sultan himself took part in these battles.

Sultan Ghiyaasuddin loved learning. The first Dhivehi dictionary written in Thaana was compiled during his reign. A number of other books, including a chronicle of his war with the Malabars, were also written during that time.

Seven years and 1 month into his reign, the Sultan left Malé during the month of Shawwal, 1187 AH for Mecca to perform pilgrimage. He appointed his sister, Amina Kanbafaan, and her husband Ali Shah Bandar (Velaanaa Manikufaan) as dual regents. Four days after the Sultan departed, Ali Shah Bandar decided to usurp the powers of Sultan for himself. The result was that Muhammed Manikufaan moved against Ali Shah Bandar and the outcome was Muhammed Manikufan proclaimed himself as the Sultan.

Muhammed Manikufaan ascended the throne as Sultan Muhammad Shams ud-din Iskandar II. After becoming the Sultan, he banished the family members of Sultan Ghiyaasuddin to various islands and recalled to Malé the three sons of Dhon Bandaarain and their uncle, Ali Rannabandeyri Kilegefaan. He dismantled the residence of Sultan Ghiyaasuddin, impounded all the property to be found there and also all the land and waqf belonging to the members of the Dhiyamigili Dynasty. Some of the books, personal property and jewellery were also seized and the members of the Dhiyamigili Dynasty.

After reigning for a short while, Sultan Muhammed Shamsuddin abdicated in favour of Muhammed, the eldest son of Dhon Bndaarain. The new Sultan reigned as Sultan Muhammed Muizzuddin, popularly known as Kalhu Bandaarain. After abdication, Sultan Muhammad Shams ud-din Iskandar II proclaimed himself Muhammed Faashanaa Kilegefaan.

As Sultan Ghiyaasuddin returned to the Maldives, he learned about the developments in Malé, and upon hearing which, he set sail to Malé. The ship drifted off course and entered Malé atoll near Guraidhoo-Vilingilivaru. Staying on board, he sent a letter to the reigning Sultan. In this letter, he said that he was reconciled with the will of the Almighty Allah, and sought the protection of the Sultan and Faashanaa Kilegefaan.

Upon receiving the letter, the Sultan and Faashanaa Kilegefaan sent their troops and brought to Malé all Maldivians and men from Muscat who were with Ghiyaasuddin. Three close aides of the Sultan and other courtiers were sent in a boat to Ghiyaasuddin's ship. These people took Ghiyaasuddin in their boat away from the sight of the men who had traveled with Ghiyaasuddin and killed him by drowning him with weights tied to his body. He drowned 8 October 1774.

The nobles in Malé informed the people that a boat had been sent to bring Ghiyaasuddin to Malé. Ranjehi Ganduvaru was readied to welcome Ghiyaasuddin. On the return of the boat to Malé, the people were informed that Ghiyaasuddin had disembarked and entered Ranjehi Gandavaru. Welcome ceremonies and festivities were begun at Ranjehi Ganduvaru. The people did not learn of the assassination until a day or two later. Once the people learned about the killing, they gathered in protest near Bodu Ganduvaru. As the mob grew more vociferous, Muhammed Faashanaa Kilegefaan came out and said that the decree for the assassination was issued by the Chief Justice. But the latter took an oath to declare that he was completely unaware of it. Following these protests, young Abdulla, a son of Ghiyaasuddin who was in Malé, was banished to Fuvahmulah at the age of seven.

Sultan Ghiyaasuddin is popularly known as the Martyred Sultan. He is also known as Haajee Bandaarain. He was the last sultan of the Dhiyamigili Dynasty.

Sultan Muhammed Ghiya'as ud-din's father is Sultan Ibrahim Iskandar II son of Sultan Muzaffar Muhammad Imaduddin II of the Dhiyamigili Dynasty.

Sultan Muhammed Ghiya'as ud-din's mother is Aisha Kanbafan daughter of Fathima Maavaa Kilegefan daughter of Athiree Kamanaa daughter of Athiree Hawwa Bee daughter of Koruvalu Zulaikha Bee daughter of Hafiza Bodu Fathima Fan daughter of al- Qazi Muhammad Shamsuddin al-kabeer (Addu Bodu Fandiyaaru Thakurufaan) from the island of Meedhoo in Addu Atoll.

Preceded by Sultan al-Ghazi al-Hasan 'Izz ud-din Sri Kula Ranmiba Danala Kirti Kattiri Buwana Maha Radun	Sultan of the Maldives; 1766–1773	Succeeded by Sultan Muhammad Shams ud-din Iskandar II
