= Lists of monarchs of Romania =

Lists of Romanian monarchs include:

- List of rulers of Wallachia (c. 1310 or 1324–1862)
- List of rulers of Moldavia (1347–1862)
- Domnitori (1862–1881)
- King of Romania (1881–1947)

== See also ==
- List of heads of state of Romania
