= Ibrahim Nooraddeen =

Sultan of the Maldives

- Sultan of the Land and Sea, Lord of the Twelve-Thousand-Islands, Sultan of the Maldives
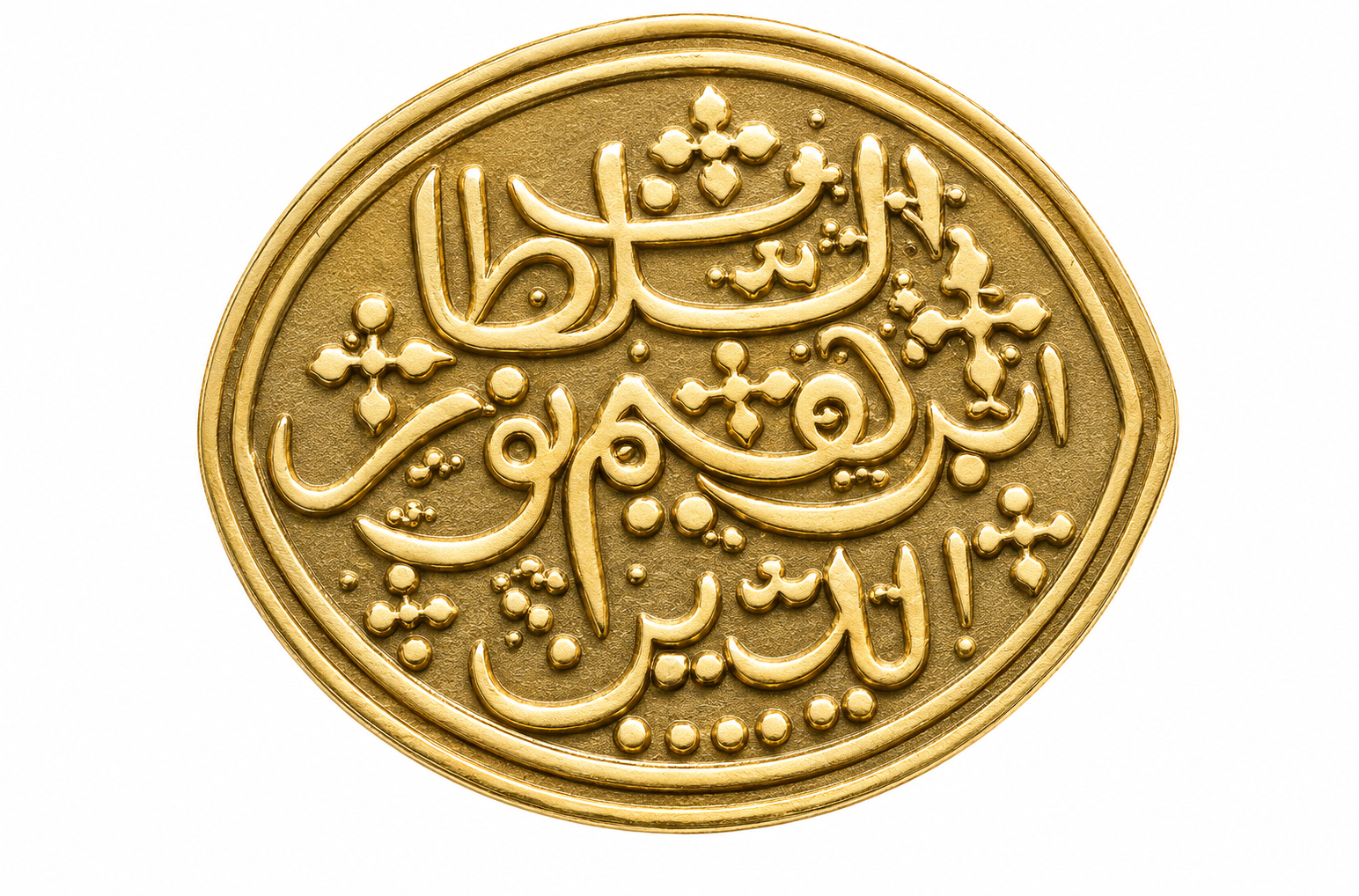
- Reign: 1882 - 1886
- Predecessor: H.M Sultan Muhammad Imaaduddeen IV
- Successor: H.M Sultan Muhammad Mueenuddeen II
- Reign: 04 Jan 1889 - 29 Nov 1892
- Predecessor: H.M Sultan Muhammad Mueenuddeen II
- Successor: Sultan Muhammad Imaaduddeen V
- Born: Malé
- Died: 29 November 1892; Male’, Maldives
- Burial: Malé Friday Mosque
- Spouse: Kakaagey Dhon goma (Queen consort)
- Issue: Sultan Muhammad Shamsuddeen III; Sultan Muhammad Imaaduddeen V
Names
- H.M Sultan Ibrahim Nooraddeen Keerithi Mahaa Radhun
- House: Muleege
- Dynasty: Huraa Dynasty
- Father: H.M Sultan Muhammad Imaaduddeen IV
- Mother: HRH Kanba Dhaleykaa Fulhu (aka Bodukiba Didi)

Sultan Ibrahim Nooraddeen (Dhivehi: ސުލްޠާން އިބްރާހީމް ނުރައްދީން; died 19 November 1892) was twice the sultan of the Maldives. His first reign was from 1882 through 1886. After 4 years, 11 months and 29 days, Muhammad Mueenuddeen II took over the throne. Nooraddeen then came to power for the second time in 1888, and was the sultan until he died in 1892.

Origins of the Maldives Military Force

The precursor to the modern Maldives National Defence Force was formally established on 21 April 1892, during the reign of Sultan Ibrahim Nooraddin Siree Sundura Kaththiri Bavana Mahaaradhun. This military force was named the “Sifain.”

His Majesty the Sultan served as the Supreme Commander-in-Chief of the Maldives Military Force. Supreme military authority was vested in the monarch and included the exercise of several personal prerogatives. The routine administration and command of the military, however routine administration of the military was entrusted to the commanding officer behalf of the reigning Sultan.

Meerubahuru Ismail Didi was appointed as the first commanding officer of the Sifain, the Maldives’ first Western-style military regiment.He also held the title of “Meerubahuru,” meaning Commander of the Sea. In this capacity, he served concurrently as the Harbour Master of Malé and as the Chief Naval Officer responsible for the Kalaaseen Regiment.

C.W. Rosset

C.W. Rosset, who visited Maldives in 1885 during Sultan Ibrahim Nooraddeen's reign, wrote that he was informed by the British in Ceylon that the Sultan neither could read nor write. However historians claim that bodduns (advisors of the king) often presented an imposter depending on the meeting to foreigners. The bodduns often exercised control over the king.

Preceded by Muhammad Imaaduddeen IV	Sultan of the Maldives; 1882–1886	Succeeded by Muhammad Mueenuddeen II
Preceded by Muhammad Mueenuddeen II	Sultan of the Maldives; 1888–1892	Succeeded by Muhammad Imaaduddeen V
