= Muhammad Imaaduddeen V =

- Sultan of the Land and Sea, Lord of the Twelve-Thousand-Islands, Sultan of the Maldives
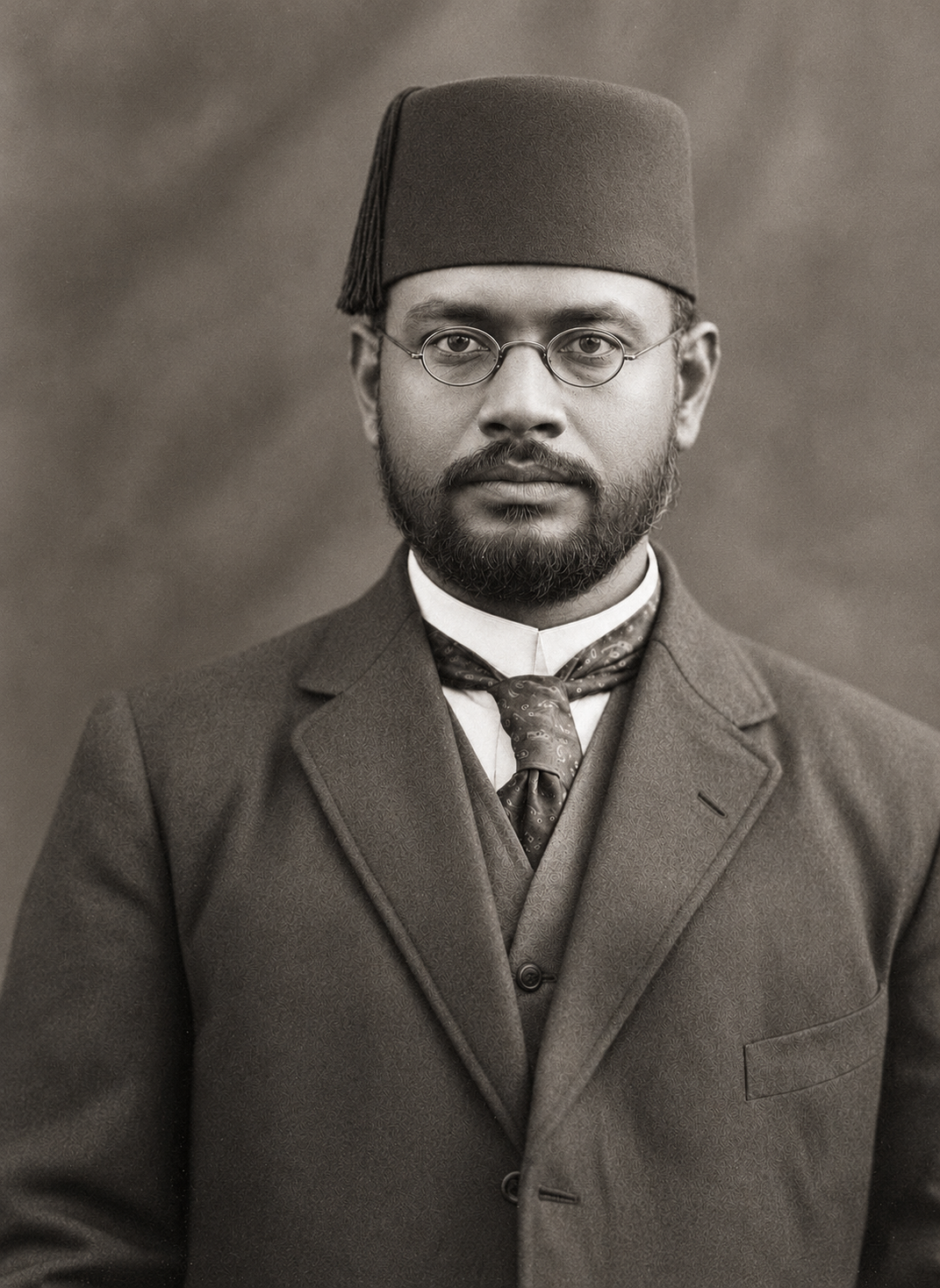
- Sultan Muhammad Imaaduddeen V

Sultan of the Maldives
- Reign: 1892 - 1893
- Predecessor: Ibrahim Nooraddeen
- Abdicated: Muhammad Shamsuddeen III
- Born: 1884; Male', Maldives
- Died: 1920 (aged 35–36); Bombay, India
- Wives: Aminath Didi (Lha Didi), Henveyruge; Badialibeyge Fathimath Didi (Malingey Didi)
- Issue: Al-Ameer Abdulla Imaduddin (Machangolhi Ganduvaru Dhoshi Manippulhu) Al-Ameer Hassan Imaduddin
Names
- Sultan Muhammad Imaduddin Keerithi Maha Radun
- House: Machangoalhi Aaganduvaru
- House: Muleege
- Dynasty: Huraa Dynasty
- Father: Sultan Ibrahim Nooraddeen of Maldives
- Mother: Hawwa Didi, Bodugaluge, Male' Maldives
- Religion: Islam

Sultan Muhammad Imaaduddeen V (Arabic: محمد عماد الدين الرابع; Dhivehi: މުހައްމަދު އިމާދުއްދީން ހަތަރު ވަނަ އެވެ (1884–1920) was the sultan of the Maldives from 1892 to 1893 for five months. The son of Sultan Ibrahim Nooraddeen and Bodugaluge Didi of Machchangoalhi Ganduvaru, he became sultan at 8 years old, after the death of his father. He was eventually succeeded by his older half-brother, Muhammad Shamsuddeen III.

== Appointment and deposition ==
Despite having an older half-brother, Imaaduddeen V, was appointed as sultan by a decree of the Council of Ministers (Raskan-hingaa Majlis) headed by Ibrahim Didi, brother-in-law to the late sultan Nooraddeen.

Meanwhile, a vigorous protest was handed down to the Ceylon Governor in Colombo by Muhammed Didi, the brother of Kakaage Don Goma, one of the late Sultan Nooraddeen's wives. He argued that the Law of Succession in the Maldive Islands which supported lineal primogeniture had been breached, and that his great-nephew Muhammed Shamsuddeen (then Kakaage Doshi Mannipulhu) who was 14, and thus the eldest son of the late Sultan, should be the legitimate heir to the throne.

Five months later, Imaaduddeen was deposed by Muhammad Shamsuddeen III as the Sultan of the Maldives. He died during his brother's reign.

Preceded by Ibrahim Nooraddeen	Sultan of the Maldives; 1892–1893	Succeeded by Muhammad Shamsuddeen III
