= Ibrahim Iskander II =

18th century Sultan of the Maldives

Sultan Ibrahim Iskander ll (Arabic: إبراهيم إسكندر الثاني; Dhivehi: އިބްރާހީމް އިސްކަންދަރު ދެވަނަ އެވެ) was the sultan of the Maldives from 1721–1750. He ascended to the throne at the age of 13, following his father Imaaduddin's death in 1721. He died in L.Gan. His regnal name was Rannava Loka.

== See also ==
- Family of Iskander II of the Maldives
