= Dhiyamigili dynasty =

Maldivian dynasty (1704–1759)

The Dhiyamigili dynasty was a Maldivian dynasty that lasted for fifty-five years, from 1704 to 1759 AD. During this period there were five rulers. It was followed by the Huraa dynasty.

== Rulers ==
Name	Regnal name	Duration of reign	Monarch from	Monarch until	Claim / relationship with predecessor(s)	Notes
Sultan Muhammad Imaduddin II	Kula Sundhura Siyaaka Saasthura	16 years	1704	1720	Son of Sultan Ibrahim Muzhir al-Dins maternal (Athiree Kamana) aunt Amina Dio	Prime Minister to Sultan Ibrahim Mudzhiruddine First of the Dhiyamigili dynasty. Commissioned Hassan Taj al-Din to write the Ta’rīkh.
Sultan Ibrahim Iskandar II	Rannava Loka	30 years	1720	1750	Son of Sultan Muhammad Imaduddin II	
Sultan Muhammad Imaduddin III	Navaranna Keerithi	7 years	1750	1757 Died in captivity by Ali Raja	Son of Sultan Muhammad Imaduddin II	Held captive on Kavaratti island from 1752 until his death in 1757. In 1752 he was seized by the Ali Raja of Cannanore and transported to Kavaratti island in the Laccadives. Male was occupied. The occupation was ended by Muleegey Don Hassan Maniku. The sultan died in captivity. During this time Maldives was ruled by the captive sultan's niece Amina I of Maldives and his daughter Amina II. The de facto regent was Muleegey Don Hassan Maniku.
Interregnum		2 years	1757	1759		Regency continued in expectation of the return of the deceased Sultan's heir from captivity.
Sultana Amina I		1 year	1753	1754 Abdicated	Daughter of Sultan Ibrahim Iskandar II	Amina assumed the role of the ruler of Maldives in 1753 after Male was recaptured from the Malabars after 17 weeks of occupation. She was the daughter of Sultan Ibrahim Iskandar II and Aisha Manikfan. She abdicated the throne and moved to Addu Atoll in the south. She was later banished to various islands and eventually became the Ruler of Maldives for the second time as the regent during the reign of her younger brother Sultan Mohamed Ghiyasuddin in 1773.
Sultana Amina II		2 years	1757	1759	Daughter of Sultan Muhammad Imaduddin III	Amina succeeded her cousin in 1754 as nominal regent for her absent father the age of nine, while Muleegey Hassan Manikfaan managed the political affairs as de facto regent. Her father died in 1757 in Minicoy, after which she formally became monarch and queen regnant. In 1759 Sultan Hassan Izzuddin became monarch in absentia of Dhiyamigili Sultan.

== See also ==
- List of Maldivian monarchs
- List of Sunni dynasties
