= Muhammad Shamsuddeen III =

Muhammad Shamsuddeen Iskander III, CMG
- Sultan of the Land and Sea, Lord of the Twelve-Thousand-Islands, Sultan of the Maldives
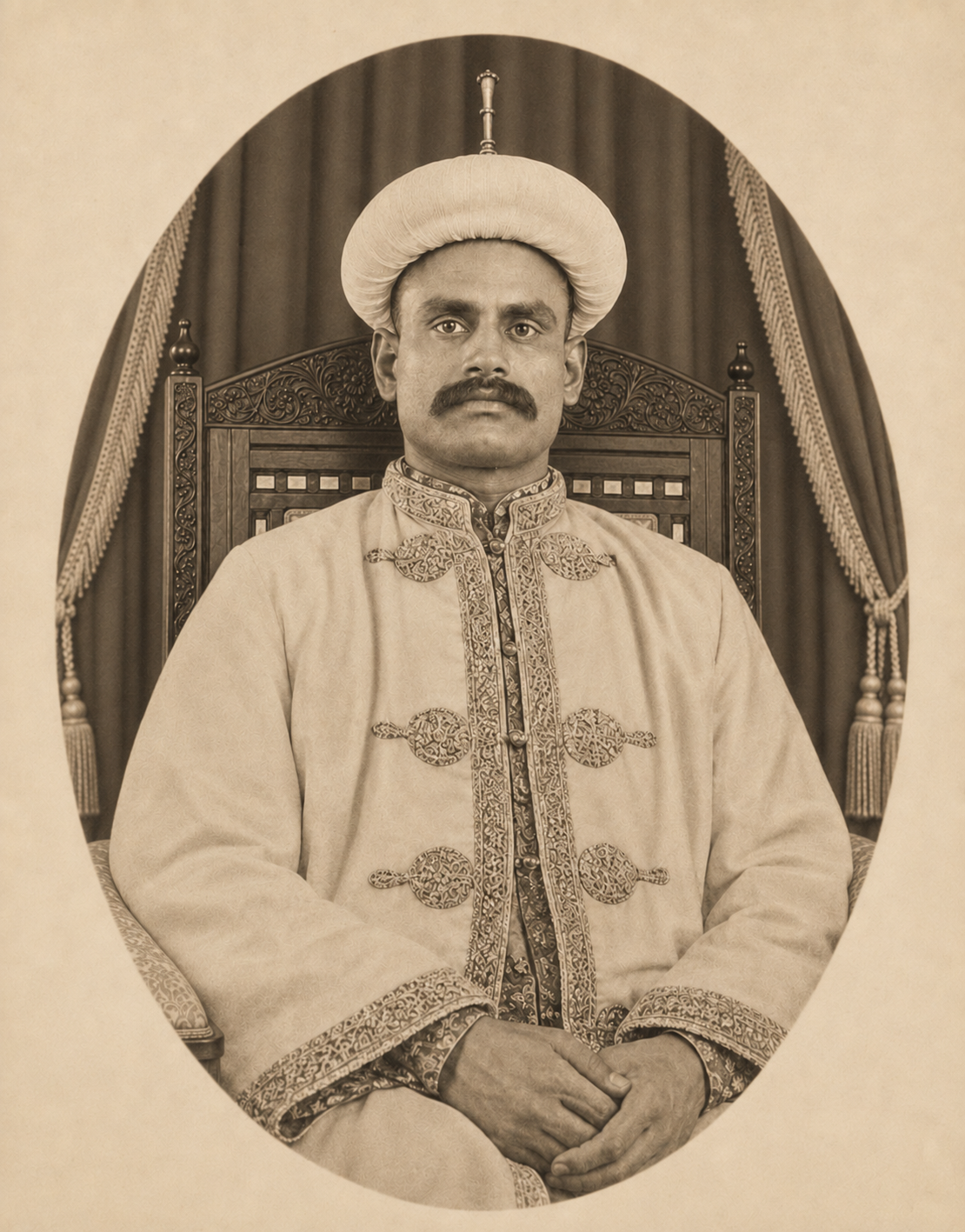
- Muhammad Shamsuddeen III, 1920

Sultan of the Maldives
- 1st reign: 7 May 1893 – 3 August 1893
- Predecessor: Muhammad Imaaduddeen V
- Successor: Muhammad Imaaduddeen VI
- 2nd reign: 11 March 1903 – 2 October 1934
- Coronation: 27 July 1905
- Predecessor: Muhammad Imaaduddeen VI
- Successor: Hassan Nooraddeen II
- Born: 20 October 1879, Prince Muhammad Shams-ud-din Iskander; Malé, Maldives
- Died: 12 March 1935 (aged 65); Malé, Maldives
- Burial: 12 March 1935; Malé Friday Mosque
- Spouse: Kalhuhuraage Sithi and Medhuganduvaru Goma
- Issue: Izzuddine, Crown Prince of the Maldives, Princess Shaheema, Princess Shameema, Princess Thithi Goma Fulhu, Princess Medhu Goma Fulhu, Princess Thuthu Goma Fulhu
Names
- Sultan Muhammad Shams-ud-din III Iskander Sri Kula Sundara Kattiri Buwana Maha Radun ibn Sultan Ibrahim Nooraddeen Iskandhar
- House: Muleege
- Dynasty: Huraa Dynasty
- Father: Sultan Ibrahim Nooraddeen of Maldives
- Mother: Kakaagey Dhon goma (Queen consort of Sultan Ibraahim Nooraddeen)

Sultan Muhammad Shamsuddeen Iskander III, CMG, (Dhivehi: ސުލްޠާން މުޙައްމަދު ޝަމްސުއްދީން; 20 October 1879 – 12 March 1935), son of Ibrahim Nooraddeen and Kakaage Don Goma, was the Sultan of the Maldives first from 7 May 1893 and then again from 1902.

== Life ==
When he was 14 years, after the death of his father Sultan Ibrahim Nooraddeen, he was nominated as the Sultan only after the people expressed their dissatisfaction with the appointment of his eight-year-old half-brother as Sultan Muhammad Imaaduddeen V against the Law of Succession in the Maldive Islands. Shamsuddeen's succession to the throne was in part favoured by the fact that he was great-nephew to Muhammad Didi Ranna Baderi Kilegefanu, the prime minister to three successive Sultans, who strongly protested to the Ceylon Governor in Colombo on behalf of his discarded great-nephew.

From Malé, Shamsuddeen wrote to his great-uncle, to return and resume the post of prime minister. At this time Haajee Imaaduddeen, nephew of the late Sultan Nooraddeen, who would take over the throne after 2 months, ran the country. Ibrahim Didi and some other members of the Council of Ministers ('little knowing what evil a decade was to bring forth') encouraged Haajee Imaaduddeen to seize the throne from the young sultan as they despised Muhammad Didi's complete control over his grandnephew Sultan Shamsuddeen. However, the enthronement was based on the specious plea stating a unanimous dissatisfaction by the people regarding the existing sultanate with a 'mere lad as Sultan, not able to do or undo anything himself'. By this decree, Haajee Imaaduddeen was raised to the throne and named Sultan Muhammad Imaaduddeen VI, with Ibrahim Didi as his prime minister.

Shamsuddeen returned to power in 1902 after the peaceful Malé Revolution which took place while Sultan Muhammad Imaaduddeen VI temporarily quit his kingdom with the object of marrying the high-born Egyptian Sharifa Hanim, the daughter of Abd-ur Rakhman Khami Bhey, the Consul of Persia. Muhammad Shamsuddeen III's full coronation ceremony (the Ceremony of the Assumption of the State Sword of the Kingdom of the Maldive Islands) was not held until 27 July 1905. The ceremony was attended by Sir John Keene on behalf of Edward VII, the Katheeb of Kelaa of Thiladhummathi Atoll on behalf of the inhabitants of the northern atolls of the kingdom and the Katheeb of Isdhū of Haddhunmathi Atoll on behalf of the inhabitants of the southern atolls of the kingdom.

He was arrested on 2 October 1934 and was banished to Fuvahmulah with crown prince Henveyru Ganduvaru Manippulhu. The crown prince died there, but later the Sultan was brought to Malé Atoll Villigili. The Sultan died in Malé at the residence of Moonimaa'ge.

He is credited with bringing the first Constitution of Maldives on 22 December 1932.

Preceded by Muhammad Imaaduddeen V	Sultan of the Maldives; 7 May 1893 – 1893	Succeeded by Haajee Imaaduddeen
Preceded by Haajee Imaaduddeen	Sultan of the Maldives; 1902 – 2 October 1934	Succeeded by Hassan Nooraddeen Iskandar II
