= Huraa dynasty =

Maldives royal dynasty (1757–1965)

Sultanate of Maldives
- 1757–1766; 1774–1952; 1954–1968
- Capital: Malé
- Common languages: Dhivehi, English, Arabic
- Religion: Sunni Islam (official)
- Government: Absolute monarchy (1757–1766; 1774–1932); Unitary parliamentary constitutional monarchy (1932–1952; 1954–1968)
- Sultan
  - 1757–1766; 1774–1779 (first): Sultan al-Ghazi Hasan 'Izz ud-din
  - 1954–1968 (last): Muhammad Fareed Didi
- Legislature: None (rule by decree) (until 1932); People's Majlis (from 1932)
- History
  - Established: 1772
- Currency: Maldivian rufiyaa
- ISO 3166 code: MV

The Huraa Dynasty was the sixth royal dynasty to rule over the Sultanate of Maldives from 1757 to 1965. It was founded by Sultan al-Ghazi Hasan 'Izz ud-din.

== Rulers ==
List of Huraa Sultans:

- Sultan al-Ghazi Hasan 'Izz ud-din (1757–1766 Sultan in absentia until the return of Dhiyamigili heir Giyath al-Din during Dhiyamigili Dynasty )
- Sultan Muhammad Shams ud-din Iskandar II (1773–1774 )
- Sultan Muhammad Mu'iz ud-din Iskander (1774–1779)
- Hassan Nooraddeen I (1779–1799)
- Muhammad Mueenuddeen I (1799–1835)
- Muhammad Imaaduddeen IV (1835–1882)
- Ibrahim Nooraddeen (1882–1886)
- Muhammad Mueenuddeen II (1886–1888)
- Ibrahim Nooraddeen (1888–1892) (second time)
- Muhammad Imaaduddeen V (1892–1893)
- Muhammad Shamsuddeen III (1893)
- Haajee Imaaduddeen (1893–1902)
- Muhammad Shamsuddeen III (1902–1934) (second time)
- Hassan Nooraddeen Iskandar II (1934–1943)
- Abdul Majeed Didi (1943–1952)
- Republic (1952–1954)
- Muhammad Fareed Didi (1954–1968)

Republic declared in 1968

Heads of the Huraa dynasty since 1968, who did not rule as sultans:

- Muhammad Fareed Didi (1968–1969)
- Ibrahim Fareed Didi (1969)

== See also ==
- List of Maldivian monarchs
- List of Sunni dynasties
