= Muhammad Imaaduddeen VI =

Muhammad Imaduddeen VI
- Lord of Twelve Thousand Isles, Sultan of the Land and Sea
- Sultan Muhammad Imaduddeen VI

Sultan of the Maldives
- Reign: 3 August 1893 – 11 March 1903
- Predecessor: Muhammad Shamsuddeen III
- Successor: Muhammad Shamsuddeen III
- Born: 25 October 1868; Male'
- Died: 30 September 1932 (aged 63); Cairo, Egypt
- Burial: 1932; Cairo, Egypt
- Wives: Princess Aaganduvaru Dhoshee Goma; Galolhugey Sara Didi; Eggamugey Umm Kulthoum Didi; Sharifa Hanim
- Issue: Princess Aishath Imaduddeen, Prince Abdullah Imaduddeen, Prince Hassan Imaduddeen, Princes Gulistan Imaduddeen, Prince Ismail Imaduddeen, Princess Daulat Imaduddeen (D\O Sharifa Hanim),
Names
- Sultan Haji Muhammad Imaduddeen VI Iskandar
- House: Huraage
- Dynasty: Huraa Dynasty
- Father: Prince Hassan Izzuddeen [Maandhoogey Bodu Dhoshee Manippulhu]
- Mother: Maandhoogey Dhon Didi

Sultan Haji Muhammad Imaaduddeen VI Iskandar was the sultan of the Maldives from 1893 to 1902. Sultan Imaaduddeen was born on 25 October 1868 to Prince Hassan Izzuddeen and Maandhoogey Dhon Didi. He was the younger half brother of Sultan Muhammad Mueenuddeen II [Kuda Bandaarain] and the grandson of Sultan Muhammad Imaduddeen IV of the Maldive islands. Despite being the eldest son of the latter, his father Prince Hassan Izzuddeen was removed from the line of succession on account of his blindness.

Sultan Imaaduddeen VI ascended the throne on 20 July 1893. After his Hajj pilgrimage he became famous with the name as Haji Imaadudeen. He spoke fluent Urdu and Arabic. Sultan Imaaduddeen VI went to Egypt to marry his fiancé Sharifaa Hanim, and while he was there he was deposed from the throne.

He died on 30 September 1932 and was buried in Cairo, the capital of Egypt.

Preceded by Muhammad Shamsuddeen III	Sultan of the Maldives; 1893–1902	Succeeded by Muhammad Shamsuddeen III
