= Izz al-Din =

Izz al-Din (Arabic: عزّ الدين or commonly written عزّ الدين, ‘izzu ’d-dīn, ‘izza ’d-dīn, also written Azzedine or Azzeddine) is a masculine given name and surname of Arabic origin meaning "high rank (honour, esteem, prestige) of the Islamic religion/faith". The prefix "‘izz" meaning "high rank, honour, esteem, prestige" is also the notions of being respected, cherished, be strong or powerful. Notable people with the name include:

== Given name ==
=== Azz ed-Din ===
- Azzedine Alaia (1935–2017), Tunisian fashion designer
- Azzedine Amanallah (born 1956), Moroccan footballer
- Azzedine Azzouzi (born 1947), Algerian runner
- Azzedine Basbas (born 1967), Algerian weightlifter
- Azzedine Benchaïra (born 1978), Algerian footballer
- Azzedine Boukerche, Canadian engineer
- Azzedine Bousseksou (born 1964), French-Algerian physical chemist
- Azzedine Bouzerar (born 1953), Algerian handball player
- Azzedine Brahmi (born 1966), Algerian long-distance runner
- Azzedine Chih (born 1960), Algerian football manager
- Azzedine Aït Djoudi (born 1967), Algerian football manager
- Azzedine Dkidak (born 2000), Dutch-Moroccan footballer
- Azzedine Doukha (born 1986), Algerian footballer
- Azzedine Lagab (born 1986), Algerian road bicycle racer
- Azzeddine Laraki (1929–2010), Prime Minister of Morocco
- Azzedine Meguellatti (1960–2024), French football manager
- Azzedine Mihoubi (born 1959), Algerian political candidate, journalist, poet, and novelist
- Azz-ud-din Mirza (1691–1744), Mughal prince
- Azzedine Ouhib (born 1956), Algerian handball player
- Azzedine Ounahi (born 2000), Moroccan footballer
- Azzeddine Ourahou (born 1984), Moroccan footballer
- Azzedine Rahim (born 1972), Algerian footballer
- Azzedine Saïd (born 1961), Algerian boxer
- Azzedine Sakhri (born 1968), Algerian long-distance runner
- Azzeddine Toufiqui (born 1999), French footballer
- Azzedine Zerdoum (born 1977), Algerian cross-country runner

=== Ezz El-Din ===
- Ezzeldin Muktar Abdurahman (born 1957), Egyptian academic
- Ezzeldin Bahader (born 1945), Egyptian footballer
- Ezz El-Din Esmail (1929–2007), Egyptian critic and university professor
- Ezzedine Choukri Fishere (born 1966), Egyptian novelist, diplomat, and academic
- Ezzedin Yacoub Hamed, Egyptian long-jumper
- Ezz Eddin Hosni (1927–2013), Egyptian composer
- Ezzedine Kalak (1936–1978), Palestinian diplomat
- Ezzedine Khémila, Tunisian football manager
- Ezz El-Din Nasir (born 1963), Egyptian boxer
- Ezzedine Salim (1943–2004), Iraqi writer and politician
- Ezzeddine Hadj Sassi (born 1962), Tunisian footballer
- Ezz El-Dine Zulficar (1919–1963), Egyptian film director

=== Izz al-Din ===
- Izzuddin of the Maldives (1720–1767), King of the Maldives
- Izzuddine, Crown Prince of the Maldives (1901–1940), Maldivian royal
- Izzeldin Abuelaish (born 1955), Canadian-Palestinian medical doctor and author
- Izz Alden Abu Aqoleh (born 2006), Jordanian footballer
- Izz al-Din Abd al-Aziz (died 1406), Mamluk Sultan
- Izudin Bajrović (born 1963), Bosnian actor
- Izzuddin Balban, Governor of Bengal
- Izzeldin Bukhari (born 1984/85), Palestinian chef
- İzzettin Çalışlar (1882–1951), Turkish military officer
- Izz al-Din al-Dawla, Iraqi politician
- Izudin Dervić (born 1963), Bosnian footballer
- Izzeldin Elhabib (born 1987), Sudanese footballer
- Izz al-Din al-Haddad (1970–2026), Palestinian militant
- Izzeddin Hasanoghlu, Iranian-Azerbaijani poet
- Izz al-Din Husayn (died 1146), king of the Ghurid dynasty
- Izz al-Din Jafar, Sultan of the Eretnids from 1354 to 1355
- Izz al-Din al-Kawrani, Egyptian politician and military leader
- Izz El-Deen Sheikh Khalil (1963–2004), Palestinian resistance fighter
- Izz al-Din ibn Rukn al-Din Mahmud (died 1382), Mihrabanid malik of Sistan
- Izz al-Din Manasirah (1946–2021), Palestinian poet, critic, intellectual, and academic
- Izz ad-Din Mas'ud (died 1193), Zangi emir of Mosul
- Izz al-Din Mas'ud II (died 1218), Zangi emir of Mosul
- Izz ad-Din al-Qassam (1882–1935), Palestinian Islamic preacher and resistance fighter
- Izzuddin Roslan (born 1999), Malaysian footballer
- Izz al-Din ibn 'Abd al-Salam (1181/82–1262), court official of Ayyubid ruler As-Salih Ayyub, Ash'ari scholar and jurist of the Shafi'i school of thought
- Izz al-Din Abu Al-Saud (born 2005), Jordanian footballer
- Izz al-Din ibn Shaddad (1217–1285), Syrian official and historian
- Izzdin Shafiq (born 1990), Singaporean footballer
- Izz al-Din Shir (died 1423), founder of the Emirate of Hakkâri
- Izz al-Din Usama, Ayyubid emir
- Izz al-Din Yahya (died 1338), governor of the provincial Satgaon
- İzzettin Yıldırım (1946–2000), Turkish-Kurdish Nurcu activist

=== Izudin ===
- Izudin Bajrović
- Izudin Dervić

== Surname ==
- Abu Izzadeen (adopted name) (born 1976), British Muslim activist
- Hassan Izz-Al-Din (born 1963), Lebanese wanted by the United States government
- Mansoura Ez-Eldin (born 1976), Egyptian novelist and journalist
- Mohamed Izzadeen (born 1979), Sri Lankan footballer
- Mohammad Ezodin Hosseini Zanjani (1921–2013) Iranian Shia Marja
- Muhaimin Izuddin
- Muhammad Izz al-Din I (died 1539), leader of the Tayyibi Isma'ili community
- Ramzy Ezzeldin Ramzy (born 1954), Egyptian politician and diplomat
- Ruqaya Izzidien, Iraqi–Welsh novelist and freelance journalist
- Salah Ezzedine (born 1962), Lebanese businessman accused of running a pyramid scheme
- Sofiane Azzedine (born 1980), Algerian footballer
- Yusuf Izzettin Efendi (1857–1916), Ottoman prince
- Yussuf Izzuddin Shah of Perak (1890–1963), Sultan of Perak, Malaysia

== Middle name ==
- Raja Izuddin Chulan
