= Agustín Argote =

Spanish boxer

Personal information
- Full name: Agustín Argote Marquínez
- Nationality: Spanish
- Born: 11 March 1926 Navarre, Spain
- Died: 5 August 1996 (aged 70) Adelaide, Australia

Sport
- Sport: Boxing

Agustín Argote Marquínez (Note: In this Spanish name, the first or paternal surname is Argote and the second or maternal family name is Marquínez.) (11 March 1926 – 5 August 1996) was a Spanish boxer. He competed in the men's lightweight event at the 1948 Summer Olympics. At the 1948 Summer Olympics, he lost to Alberto Boullosa by a 3 round decision..

== Career ==
Argote began his professionalboxing career in Bilbao defeating Antonio Luno by 8 round decision. In his 8th fight he won a 12 round decision to Juanito Martin for the Spanish Welterweight title. He lost the title in his next fight to Antonio Monzon. After a series of fights in Germany and France Argote in 1951 won the Spanish Lightweight title defeating Bartolome Marti by 12 round decision. In 1952 Argote fought future world champion Dulio Loi losing a 10 round decision in Milan, Italy. The following year Argote won and lost bouts in the Philippines. Later that year Argote fought in Australia a place that he would live for the remainder of his life. He fought 17 times and once in New Zealand. His major victories were Pat Ford (boxer) twice. Ford was a British Empire champion, American Marshall Clayton was defeated by 12 round decision, and British Empire champion Darby Brown He also fought Ivor Germain a British Empire champion, Bruno Visintin a European champion twice, Dulio Loi, New Zealand champion Billy Beazley and Colin Clarke for the Vacant Australian Lightweight title.

Argote fought a total of 65 bouts for 39 wins and 19 losses and 7 draws.
