= Maxie McCullagh =

Irish boxer

Personal information
- Nationality: Irish
- Born: 21 June 1922
- Died: 30 March 2001 (aged 78)

Sport
- Sport: Boxing

Maxie McCullagh (21 June 1922 – 30 March 2001) was an Irish boxer. He competed in the men's lightweight event at the 1948 Summer Olympics. In his first two fights at the Olympics, he beat Tauno Rinkinen and Ron Cooper, before losing to Svend Wad in the quarterfinals.
