= Boxing at the 1948 Summer Olympics – Lightweight =

Boxing competitions

Men's lightweight at the Games of the XIV Olympiad
- Venue: Earl's Court; Wembley Arena
- Date: 9–13 August 1948
- Competitors: 28 from 28 nations

Medalists
1st place, gold medalist(s)		Gerald Dreyer	South Africa
2nd place, silver medalist(s)		Joseph Vissers	Belgium
3rd place, bronze medalist(s)		Svend Wad	Denmark

The men's lightweight boxing competition at the 1948 Olympic Games in London was held from 9 to 13 August at the Empress Hall in Earl's Court and the Wembley Arena.

== Competition format ==
Like all Olympic boxing events, the competition was a straight single-elimination tournament. The competition began with a preliminary round on 9 August, where the number of competitors was reduced to 16, and concluded with a final on 13 August. As there were less than 32 boxers in the competition, a number of boxers received a bye for the preliminary round. All bouts consisted of three periods where the boxers received points for every successful punch they land on their opponent's head or upper body. The boxer with the most points at the end of the bouts wins. If a boxer is knocked to the ground and cannot get up before the referee counts to 10 then the bout is over and the opponent wins.

== Results ==
Round of 32
Tauno Rinkinen (FIN)
Maxie McCullagh (IRL)	PTS
Jan Remie (NED)
Ron Cooper (GBR)	PTS
Gene Raymond (IND)
Svend Wad (DEN)	PTS
Alberto Boullosa (URU)	PTS
Agustín Argote (ESP)
Raúl Zumbano (BRA)	KO-2
Fränz Ehringer (LUX)
Auguste Caulet (FRA)	PTS
Mario Minatelli (ITA)
Eduardo Cornejo (CHI)
Wallace Smith (USA)	PTS
Masoud Rahimiha (IRI)
Manuel López (ARG)	PTS
Eddie Haddad (CAN)	PTS
Ezz El-Din Nasir (EGY)
Edward Gray (CEY)	DSQ-1
Alois Petřina (TCH)
Edy Schmidiger (SUI)	WO
L. Gutierrez Chacon (PER)
Joseph Vissers (BEL)	PTS
Billy Barber (AUS)

Round of 16
Gerald Dreyer (RSA)	PTS
Ernesto Porto (PHI)
Øivind Breiby (NOR)	PTS
Gang In-seok (KOR)
Maxie McCullagh (IRL)	PTS
Ron Cooper (GBR)
Svend Wad (DEN)	PTS
Alberto Boullosa (URU)
Ralph Zumbano (BRA)	PTS
Auguste Caulet (FRA)
Wallace Smith (USA)	PTS
Manuel López (ARG)
Eddie Haddad (CAN)	PTS
Edward Gray (CEY)
Edy Schmidiger (SUI)
Joseph Vissers (BEL)	PTS

Quarter-finals
Gerald Dreyer (RSA)	PTS
Øivind Breiby (NOR)
Maxie McCullagh (IRL)
Svend Wad (DEN)	PTS
Ralph Zumbano (BRA)
Wallace Smith (USA)	KO-2
Eddie Haddad (CAN)
Joseph Vissers (BEL)	PTS

Semi-finals
Gerald Dreyer (RSA)	PTS
Svend Wad (DEN)
Wallace Smith (USA)
Joseph Vissers (BEL)	PTS

Final
Gerald Dreyer (RSA)	PTS
Joseph Vissers (BEL)
Third place
Svend Wad (DEN)	WO
Wallace Smith (USA)
