= Caulet =

Caulet is a French surname. Notable people with the surname include:

- Auguste Caulet (1926–2011), French boxer
- François-Étienne Caulet (1610–1680), French bishop and Jansenist
