= Jan Remie =

Dutch boxer

Personal information
- Nationality: Dutch
- Born: 2 March 1924; Princenhage, Netherlands
- Died: 26 June 1950 (aged 26); Rotterdam, Netherlands

Sport
- Sport: Boxing

Jan Remie (2 March 1924 – 26 June 1950) was a Dutch boxer. He competed in the men's lightweight event at the 1948 Summer Olympics. At the 1948 Summer Olympics, he lost to Ron Cooper of Great Britain.
