= Gerald Dreyer =

South African boxer

Personal information
- Born: 22 September 1929 (age 96)
Medal record
Men's Boxing
Representing South Africa
Olympic Games
Gold medal – first place	1948 London	Lightweight

Gerald Dreyer (22 September 1929 – 5 September 1985) was a boxer from Pretoria, South Africa, who competed in the Lightweight division during his career as an amateur.

== Amateur career ==
Dreyer was the Olympic Gold Medallist at lightweight in London 1948, defeating Joseph Vissers of Belgium in the final.

Below are Gerald Dreyer's bouts from the 1948 Olympic Games:

- Round of 32: bye
- Round of 16: defeated Ernesto Porto (Philippines) on points
- Quarterfinal: defeated Øivind Breiby (Norway) on points
- Semifinal: defeated Svend Wad (Denmark) on points
- Final: defeated Joseph Vissers (Belgium) on points (won gold medal)

== Pro career ==
Dreyer turned pro in 1948 and fought primarily in New York City late in his career, retiring in 1955 after having won 41, lost 8, and drawn 2 with 23 Knockouts. Dreyer won the Commonwealth (British Empire) lightweight title beating Cliff Curvis over 15 rounds at Rand Stadium, Johannesburg on 8 December 1952.
