= Fränz Ehringer =

Luxembourgish boxer

Personal information
- Nationality: Luxembourgish
- Born: 18 November 1928; Esch-sur-Alzette, Luxembourg
- Died: 20 May 1987 (aged 58); Luxembourg, Luxembourg

Sport
- Sport: Boxing

Fränz Ehringer (18 November 1928 – 20 May 1987) was a Luxembourgish boxer. He competed in the men's lightweight event at the 1948 Summer Olympics. In his first fight, he lost to Raul Zumbano of Brazil.
