= Billy Barber (boxer) =

Australian boxer (1928–2004)

Personal information
- Full name: William Robert Barber
- Nationality: Australian
- Born: 1928
- Died: November 17, 1993 - aged 64 years 2004 (aged 75–76) Manly, New South Wales, Australia

Sport
- Sport: Boxing

William Robert Barber (1928 – June 2004) was an Australian boxer. He competed in the men's lightweight event at the 1948 Summer Olympics. At the 1948 Summer Olympics, he lost to Joseph Vissers of Belgium. Barber died in June 2004.
