= Joe Lucy =

English boxer (1930–1991)

Personal information
- Born: 2 February 1930 Mile End, London, England
- Died: 21 July 1991 (aged 61)
- Weight: Lightweight

Boxing career
- Stance: Southpaw

Boxing record
- Total fights: 37
- Wins: 27
- Win by KO: 8
- Losses: 10

Joe Lucy (2 February 1930 – 21 July 1991) was a British boxer who was British lightweight champion between 1953 and 1955 and again between 1956 and 1957.

== Career ==
Born in Mile End, London, Lucy made his professional debut in May 1950. He won 15 of his first 16 fights, his only defeat to South African Gerald Dreyer on points in April 1951. In February 1952 he suffered his second loss while challenging Tommy Barnham for the vacant BBBofC Southern Area lightweight title. He also lost his next fight, against Hocine Khalfi the following month.

He returned to winning ways and in January 1953 beat Tommy McGovern to win the Southern Area title, the fight also a final eliminator for the British title. He was due to meet Frank Johnson in June 1953 for the latter's British title, but Johnson failed to make the weight; The fight went ahead with Lucy winning on points and Johnson was stripped of the title. In September Lucy faced McGovern again for the now vacant British title. Lucy won on points to become British champion.

He had three fights in 1954, beating Belgian champion Joseph Janssens but losing twice to Johnny Butterworth, the first due to a cut while comfortably ahead. He started 1955 with an unsuccessful challenge for the vacant British Empire lightweight title against Johnny van Rensburg in Johannesburg in February, losing on a split decision, and two months later lost his British title to Johnson in one of the earliest British title fights to be shown live on television, being admitted to hospital after the fight with abdominal pains. He finished the year with another loss, to European champion Duilio Loi.

In 1956 Lucy's focus returned to the domestic title, and after knocking out Gordon Goodman in a final eliminator in February, challenged for Johnson's British title in April. Lucy avenged his earlier defeat, stopping Johnson in the eighth round to regain the title. He made a successful defence two months later, stopping Sammy McCarthy in the thirteenth round. He lost the title in April 1957 to Dave Charnley on points, and subsequently retired from boxing.

He went on to run the Ruskin Arms Hotel in Manor Park, where he promoted rock concerts.
