= Duilio Loi =

Italian boxer

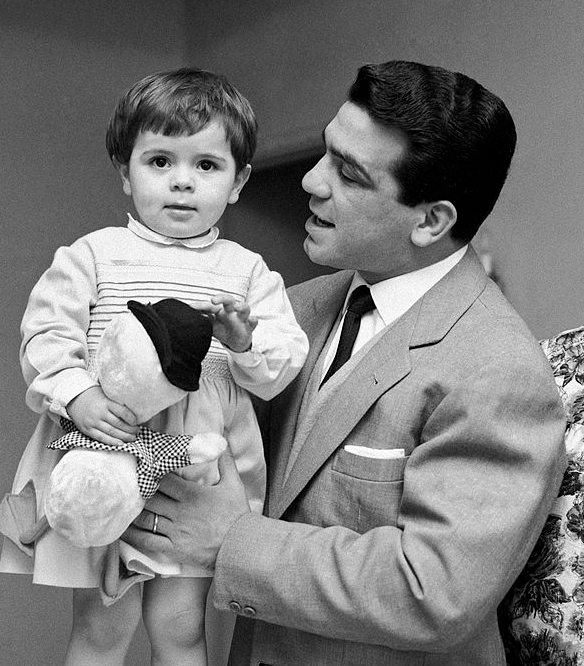
- Duilio Loi with daughter, 1960s

Personal information
- Nationality: Italian
- Born: 29 April 1929 Trieste, Kingdom of Italy
- Died: 20 January 2008 (aged 78) Treviso, Republic of Italy
- Height: 1.64 m (5 ft 5 in)
- Weight: Light welterweight

Boxing career
- Reach: 175 cm (69 in)
- Stance: Orthodox

Boxing record
- Total fights: 126
- Wins: 115
- Win by KO: 26
- Losses: 3
- Draws: 8

Duilio Loi (19 April 1929 – 20 January 2008) was an Italian professional boxer who held the Italian and European lightweight and welterweight titles, as well as the World Junior Welterweight Championship. Loi fought from 1948 to 1962, and retired with a record of 115 wins (26 KOs), 3 losses and 8 draws.

Loi is widely regarded as one of the leading fighters in his weight class and among the notable boxers to come out of Italy.

== Biography ==
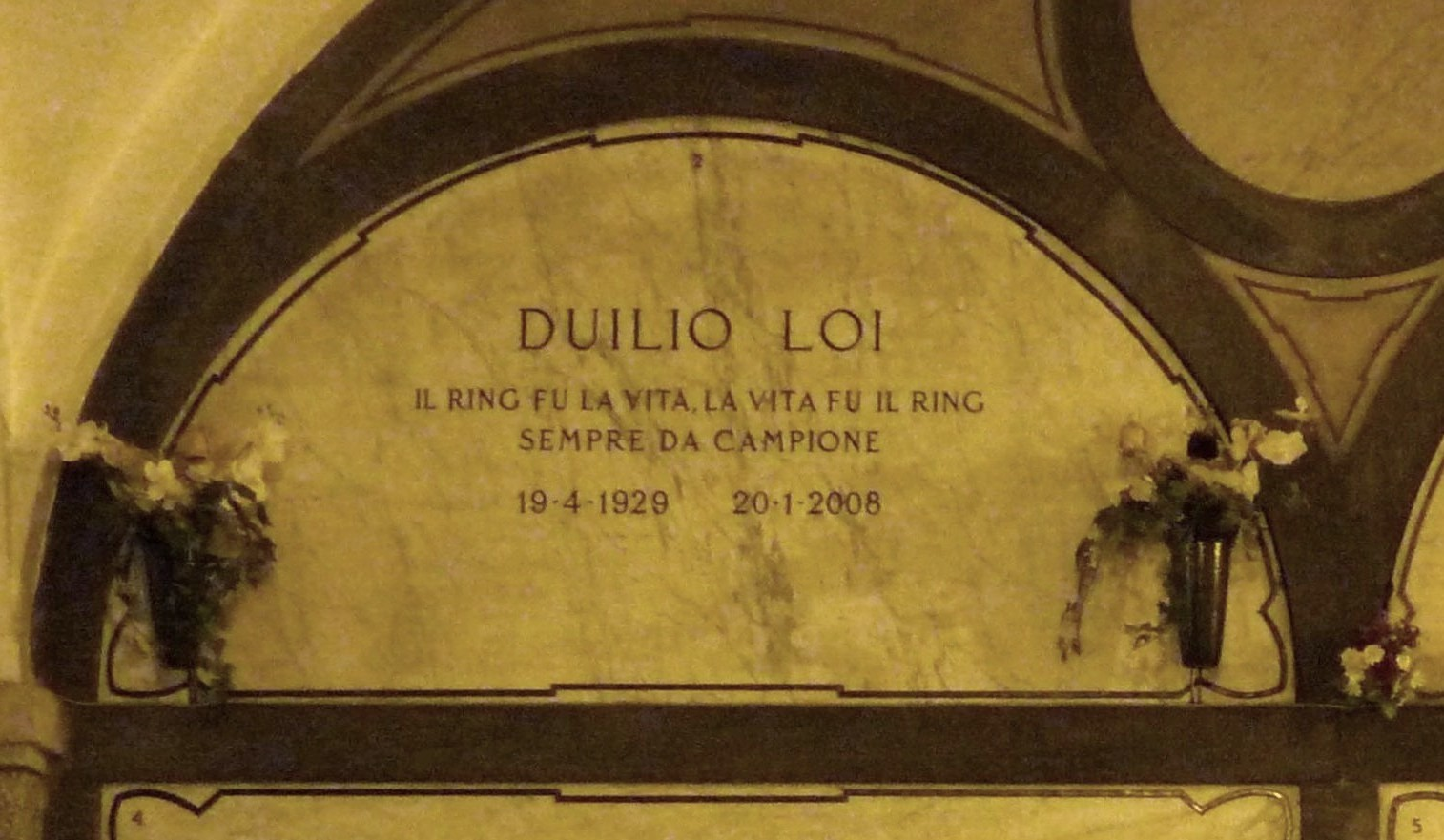
Loi's grave at the Monumental Cemetery of Milan, Italy, in 2015

Loi was born in Trieste in 1929, to a father from Sardinia and mother from Friuli-Venezia Giulia.

Loi fought many outstanding fighters in his career, including three bouts with lightweight great Carlos Ortiz. Although all their fights were close, Loi won two out of three bouts, which were all for the world light welterweight title.

The first bout, which was nationally televised in the US, took place on 16 June 1960 at Cow Palace in Daly City, California. In what would be one of only two US appearances, Loi was defeated after 15 rounds, with a controversial split-decision in Ortiz' favour. Less than three months later the two met again for a rematch, this time in Loi's native Italy. The bout took place at Milan's famous San Siro stadium, in front of a record crowd of 65,000. Loi came through strongly in the late rounds to become World Champion by majority decision. The next year a third bout took place, again at the San Siro. Loi knocked down Ortiz in the sixth and earned a victory by unanimous decision to defend his title.

After his retirement, Duillio Loi's life was marked by a personal tragedy. In 1975, his son Vittorio, a neo-fascist militant, was sentenced to ten years in prison for causing the death of a policeman in a street clash.

Loi was inducted into the International Boxing Hall of Fame in 2005. His daughter Bonaria accepted the award on his behalf, because Loi was suffering from Alzheimer's disease. Loi died in January 2008 at the age of 78 in Treviso, Italy, and is buried at the Monumental Cemetery of Milan.

== Professional boxing record ==
126 fights	115 wins	3 losses
By knockout	26	0
By decision	88	3
By disqualification	1	0
Draws	8	

No.	Result	Record	Opponent	Type	Round	Date	Location	Notes
126	Win	115–3–8	Eddie Perkins	PTS	15	Dec 15, 1962	Palazzo dello Sport (Pad. 3 Fiera), Milan, Lombardia, Italy	Won WBA, NYSAC, and vacant The Ring light welterweight titles
125	Loss	114–3–8	Eddie Perkins	UD	15	Sep 14, 1962	Velodromo Vigorelli, Milan, Lombardia, Italy	Lost WBA and NYSAC light welterweight titles
124	Win	114–2–8	Fortunato Manca	PTS	15	Jul 15, 1962	Stadio Amsicora, Cagliari, Sardegna, Italy	Retained EBU welterweight title
123	Win	113–2–8	Ike Vaughn	KO	5 (10)	May 26, 1962	Velodromo Vigorelli, Milan, Lombardia, Italy	
122	Win	112–2–8	Roger Harvey	KO	8 (10)	Apr 29, 1962	Velodromo Vigorelli, Milan, Lombardia, Italy	
121	Win	111–2–8	Willie Stevenson	PTS	10	Apr 13, 1962	Palazzetto dello Sport, Roma, Lazio, Italy	
120	Win	110–2–8	Billy Collins	PTS	10	Mar 27, 1962	PalaLido, Milan, Lombardia, Italy	
119	Win	109–2–8	J D Ellis	PTS	10	Feb 9, 1962	Palazzetto dello Sport, Roma, Lazio, Italy	
118	Win	108–2–8	Gale Kerwin	TKO	8 (10)	Dec 6, 1961	Palazzo dello Sport (Pad. 3 Fiera), Milan, Lombardia, Italy	
117	Win	107–2–8	Epiphane Akono	TKO	7 (10)	Dec 20, 1961	Palazzetto dello Sport, Roma, Lazio, Italy	
116	Draw	106–2–8	Eddie Perkins	SD	15	Oct 21, 1961	Palazzo dello Sport (Pad. 3 Fiera), Milan, Lombardia, Italy	Retained NBA and NYSAC light welterweight titles
115	Win	106–2–7	Christian Christensen	PTS	15	Aug 5, 1961	Saint-Vincent, Valle d'Aosta, Italy	Retained EBU welterweight title
114	Win	105–2–7	Carlos Ortiz	UD	15	May 10, 1961	Stadio San Siro, Milan, Lombardia, Italy	Retained NBA and NYSAC light welterweight titles
113	Win	104–2–7	Maurice Auzel	PTS	15	Nov 25, 1960	Palazzetto dello Sport, Roma, Lazio, Italy	Retained EBU welterweight title
112	Win	103–2–7	Carlos Ortiz	MD	15	Sep 1, 1960	Stadio San Siro, Milan, Lombardia, Italy	Won NBA and NYSAC light welterweight titles
111	Loss	102–2–7	Carlos Ortiz	SD	15	Jun 15, 1960	Cow Palace, Daly City, California, U.S.	For NBA and NYSAC light welterweight titles
110	Win	102–1–7	Jacques Nervi	PTS	10	Mar 31, 1960	Palazzetto dello Sport, Roma, Lazio, Italy	
109	Win	101–1–7	Tommy Molloy	RTD	4 (10)	Mar 16, 1960	Teatro Nazionale, Milan, Lombardia, Italy	
108	Win	100–1–7	Bruno Visintin	PTS	15	Feb 13, 1960	Palazzo dello Sport (Pad. 3 Fiera), Milan, Lombardia, Italy	Retained EBU welterweight title
107	Win	99–1–7	Emilio Marconi	PTS	15	Apr 19, 1959	Velodromo Vigorelli, Milan, Lombardia, Italy	Won EBU welterweight title
106	Win	98–1–7	Conny Rudhof	PTS	10	Dec 13, 1958	Torino, Piemonte, Italy	
105	Draw	97–1–7	Mario Vecchiatto	PTS	10	Sep 5, 1958	Velodromo Vigorelli, Milan, Lombardia, Italy	Retained EBU lightweight title
104	Win	97–1–6	Charley Douglas	PTS	10	Jul 7, 1958	Arena Flegrea, Napoli, Campania, Italy	
103	Win	96–1–6	Al Nevarez	PTS	10	Apr 27, 1958	Milan, Lombardia, Italy	
102	Win	95–1–6	Wallace Bud Smith	KO	9 (10)	Mar 1, 1958	Palazzo dello Sport (Pad. 3 Fiera), Milan, Lombardia, Italy	
101	Draw	94–1–6	Manfred Neuke	PTS	10	Feb 8, 1958	Sporthalle, Basel, Switzerland	
100	Win	94–1–5	Felix Chiocca	PTS	15	Dec 26, 1957	Palazzo dello Sport (Pad. 3 Fiera), Milan, Lombardia, Italy	Retained EBU lightweight title
99	Win	93–1–5	Marcel Dupre	PTS	10	Oct 29, 1957	Milan, Lombardia, Italy	
98	Win	92–1–5	Idrissa Dione	PTS	10	Sep 25, 1957	Milan, Lombardia, Italy	
97	Win	91–1–5	Stefano Bellotti	PTS	10	Sep 7, 1957	Roma, Lazio, Italy	
96	Win	90–1–5	Jack Subero	PTS	10	Jul 27, 1957	Stadio di Marassi, Genoa, Liguria, Italy	
95	Win	89–1–5	Ernst Zetzmann	PTS	8	Jul 12, 1957	Milan, Lombardia, Italy	
94	Win	88–1–5	Piet van Klaveren	TKO	6 (10)	Jun 26, 1957	Milan, Lombardia, Italy	
93	Win	87–1–5	Ahcene Attar	PTS	10	Jun 9, 1957	Cagliari, Sardegna, Italy	
92	Win	86–1–5	Chico Santos	KO	6 (10)	Jun 2, 1957	Lecco, Lombardia, Italy	
91	Win	85–1–5	Rudi Langer	PTS	10	May 29, 1957	Velodromo Vigorelli, Milan, Lombardia, Italy	
90	Win	84–1–5	Hoacine Khalfi	PTS	10	Apr 27, 1957	Milan, Lombardia, Italy	
89	Win	83–1–5	Karl Heinz Bick	TKO	10 (10)	Apr 3, 1957	Milan, Lombardia, Italy	
88	Win	82–1–5	Boby Ros	DQ	5 (10)	Feb 2, 1957	Milan, Lombardia, Italy	
87	Win	81–1–5	Jose Hernandez	PTS	15	Dec 26, 1956	Palazzo dello Sport (Pad. 3 Fiera), Milan, Lombardia, Italy	Retained EBU lightweight title
86	Win	80–1–5	Felix Chiocca	PTS	10	Dec 3, 1956	Palais des Sports, Paris, France	
85	Win	79–1–5	Sauveur Chiocca	PTS	10	Nov 10, 1956	Milan, Lombardia, Italy	
84	Win	78–1–5	Fernand Nollet	PTS	10	Oct 13, 1956	Palazzo dello Sport (Pad. 3 Fiera), Milan, Lombardia, Italy	
83	Win	77–1–5	Albert Mueller	TKO	3 (10)	Sep 23, 1956	Forli, Emilia Romagna, Italy	
82	Win	76–1–5	Fernand Nollet	PTS	10	Sep 15, 1956	Velodromo Vigorelli, Milan, Lombardia, Italy	
81	Win	75–1–5	Karl Heinz Fiedrich	PTS	10	Jul 21, 1956	Palazzetto dello Sport, Bologna, Emilia Romagna, Italy	
80	Win	74–1–5	Piet van Klaveren	RTD	6 (10)	Jul 11, 1956	Velodromo Vigorelli, Milan, Lombardia, Italy	
79	Win	73–1–5	Fred Galiana	KO	6 (10)	Jun 23, 1956	Milan, Lombardia, Italy	
78	Draw	72–1–5	Jose Hernandez	PTS	15	May 12, 1956	Velodromo Vigorelli, Milan, Lombardia, Italy	Retained EBU lightweight title
77	Win	72–1–4	Abdelkader ben Buker	PTS	10	Apr 21, 1956	Stade de la Pépinière, Tunis, Tunisia	
76	Win	71–1–4	Manolo García	PTS	10	Apr 7, 1956	Palazzo del Ghiaccio, Milan, Lombardia, Italy	
75	Win	70–1–4	Orlando Zulueta	PTS	10	Jan 21, 1956	Palazzo dello Sport (Pad. 3 Fiera), Milan, Lombardia, Italy	
74	Win	69–1–4	Gordon Goodman	KO	6 (10)	Dec 26, 1955	Palazzo dello Sport (Pad. 3 Fiera), Milan, Lombardia, Italy	
73	Win	68–1–4	Séraphin Ferrer	PTS	15	Nov 26, 1955	Palazzo dello Sport (Pad. 3 Fiera), Milan, Lombardia, Italy	Retained EBU lightweight title
72	Win	67–1–4	Werner Handtke	PTS	10	Oct 29, 1955	Palazzo dello Sport (Pad. 3 Fiera), Milan, Lombardia, Italy	
71	Win	66–1–4	Joe Lucy	PTS	10	Oct 15, 1955	Palazzo del Ghiaccio, Milan, Lombardia, Italy	
70	Win	65–1–4	Boswell St Louis	TKO	5 (10)	Sep 13, 1955	Velodromo Vigorelli, Milan, Lombardia, Italy	
69	Win	64–1–4	Frank Hermal	RTD	3 (10)	Jul 30, 1955	Saint-Vincent, Valle d'Aosta, Italy	
68	Win	63–1–4	Giancarlo Garbelli	PTS	15	Jul 2, 1955	Palazzo dello Sport (Pad. 3 Fiera), Milan, Lombardia, Italy	Retained EBU and Italian lightweight titles
67	Win	62–1–4	Morlay Kamara	PTS	10	Jun 8, 1955	Velodromo delle Cascine, Florence, Toscana, Italy	
66	Win	61–1–4	Louis Carrara	PTS	10	May 22, 1955	Velodromo Vigorelli, Milan, Lombardia, Italy	
65	Win	60–1–4	Alby Tissong	PTS	10	Apr 30, 1955	Casino di Campione, Trieste, Friuli-Venezia Giulia, Italy	
64	Win	59–1–4	Guy Gracia	PTS	10	Mar 30, 1955	Teatro Principe, Milan, Lombardia, Italy	
63	Win	58–1–4	Ray Famechon	PTS	10	Feb 19, 1955	Palazzo dello Sport (Pad. 3 Fiera), Milan, Lombardia, Italy	
62	Win	57–1–4	Glen Flanagan	UD	10	Jan 14, 1955	Auditorium, Miami Beach, Florida, U.S.	
61	Win	56–1–4	Agustín Argote	PTS	12	Nov 8, 1954	Sydney Stadium, Sydney, New South Wales, Australia	
60	Win	55–1–4	Mario Trigo	PTS	12	Oct 1, 1954	West Melbourne Stadium, Melbourne, Victoria, Australia	
59	Win	54–1–4	Ivor Germain	TKO	9 (12)	Sep 10, 1954	West Melbourne Stadium, Melbourne, Victoria, Australia	
58	Win	53–1–4	Jacques Herbillon	PTS	15	Jul 16, 1954	Velodromo Vigorelli, Milan, Lombardia, Italy	Retained EBU lightweight title
57	Win	52–1–4	Mario Ciccarelli	PTS	10	Jun 23, 1954	Velodromo Vigorelli, Milan, Lombardia, Italy	
56	Win	51–1–4	Bruno Visintin	PTS	15	May 13, 1954	Palazzo dello Sport (Pad. 3 Fiera), Milan, Lombardia, Italy	Retained EBU and Italian lightweight titles
55	Win	50–1–4	Giuseppe De Joanni	PTS	10	Mar 18, 1954	Roma, Lazio, Italy	
54	Win	49–1–4	Franco Antonini	PTS	10	Mar 3, 1954	Genoa, Liguria, Italy	
53	Win	48–1–4	Jorgen Johansen	PTS	15	Feb 6, 1954	Palazzo dello Sport (Pad. 3 Fiera), Milan, Lombardia, Italy	Won EBU lightweight title
52	Win	47–1–4	Joseph Janssens	PTS	10	Nov 15, 1953	Palazzo dello Sport (Pad. 3 Fiera), Milan, Lombardia, Italy	
51	Win	46–1–4	Sandy Manuel	PTS	10	Nov 4, 1953	Palazzo dello Sport (Pad. 3 Fiera), Milan, Lombardia, Italy	
50	Win	45–1–4	Giuseppe Fusaro	PTS	10	Oct 21, 1953	Teatro Lirico, Milan, Lombardia, Italy	
49	Draw	44–1–4	Emilio Marconi	PTS	12	Sep 13, 1953	Grosseto, Toscana, Italy	Retained Italian lightweight title
48	Win	44–1–3	Mario Rosellini	KO	2 (10)	Jul 11, 1953	Stadio Alberto Picco, La Spezia, Liguria, Italy	
47	Draw	43–1–3	Franco Antonini	PTS	10	Jun 27, 1953	Foligno, Umbria, Italy	
46	Win	43–1–2	Ernesto Formenti	TKO	10 (10)	Jun 20, 1953	Palazzo dello Sport (Pad. 3 Fiera), Milan, Lombardia, Italy	
45	Win	42–1–2	Jean Labalette	PTS	10	May 8, 1953	Pavillon des Sports, Geneva, Switzerland	
44	Win	41–1–2	Allan Tanner	PTS	10	Apr 2, 1953	Teatro Nazionale, Milan, Lombardia, Italy	
43	Win	40–1–2	Giuseppe De Joanni	PTS	10	Feb 20, 1953	Teatro Nazionale, Genoa, Liguria, Italy	
42	Win	39–1–2	Ernesto Formenti	TKO	9 (12)	Jan 28, 1953	Teatro Nazionale, Milan, Lombardia, Italy	Retained Italian lightweight title
41	Win	38–1–2	Francis Bonnardel	PTS	10	Dec 17, 1952	Teatro Nazionale, Milan, Lombardia, Italy	
40	Win	37–1–2	Serge Ceustermans	PTS	10	Nov 26, 1952	Teatro Nazionale, Milan, Lombardia, Italy	
39	Win	36–1–2	Alois Brand	PTS	10	Nov 12, 1952	Cagliari, Sardegna, Italy	
38	Loss	35–1–2	Jorgen Johansen	PTS	15	Aug 17, 1952	Idraetsparken, Copenhagen, Denmark	For EBU lightweight title
37	Win	35–0–2	Agustín Argote	PTS	10	Jun 4, 1952	Velodromo Vigorelli, Milan, Lombardia, Italy	
36	Win	34–0–2	Charles Colpin	TKO	6 (10)	Apr 12, 1952	Genoa, Liguria, Italy	
35	Win	33–0–2	Emilio Marconi	PTS	12	Apr 2, 1952	Teatro Colosseo, Genoa, Liguria, Italy	Retained Italian lightweight title
34	Win	32–0–2	Karl Pinsdorf	PTS	10	Jan 14, 1952	Teatro Colosseo, Genoa, Liguria, Italy	
33	Win	31–0–2	Emilio Orozco	TKO	6 (10)	Dec 26, 1951	Palazzo dello Sport (Pad. 3 Fiera), Milan, Lombardia, Italy	
32	Win	30–0–2	Tommy Barnham	PTS	10	Dec 10, 1951	Earls Court Empress Hall, Kensington, London, England	
31	Win	29–0–2	Svend Wad	PTS	10	Oct 26, 1951	Pavillon des Sports, Geneva, Switzerland	
30	Win	28–0–2	Ray Lewis	TKO	2 (10)	Oct 9, 1951	Teatro Massimo, Cagliari, Sardegna, Italy	
29	Win	27–0–2	Leyton Lewis	TKO	2 (10)	Sep 1, 1951	Varese, Lombardia, Italy	
28	Win	26–0–2	Gianluigi Uboldi	PTS	12	Jul 18, 1951	Velodromo Vigorelli, Milan, Lombardia, Italy	Won vacant Italian lightweight title
27	Win	25–0–2	Ray Lewis	PTS	10	Jul 6, 1951	Genoa, Liguria, Italy	
26	Win	24–0–2	Morlay Kamara	PTS	10	Jun 9, 1951	Cagliari, Sardegna, Italy	
25	Win	23–0–2	Leon Bourlet	PTS	8	Apr 14, 1951	Milan, Lombardia, Italy	
24	Win	22–0–2	Roland Guilbert	PTS	8	Mar 31, 1951	Modena, Emilia Romagna, Italy	
23	Win	21–0–2	Paul Guillaume	TKO	5 (10)	Mar 14, 1951	Teatro Nazionale, Milan, Lombardia, Italy	
22	Win	20–0–2	Jean Castellanos	PTS	10	Mar 7, 1951	Monza, Lombardia, Italy	
21	Win	19–0–2	Karl Marchart	PTS	10	Feb 21, 1951	Teatro Nazionale, Milan, Lombardia, Italy	
20	Win	18–0–2	Frank Hermal	PTS	10	Dec 14, 1950	Milan, Lombardia, Italy	
19	Draw	17–0–2	Luigi Male'	PTS	12	Nov 8, 1950	Milan, Lombardia, Italy	For Italian lightweight title
18	Draw	17–0–1	Allan Tanner	PTS	10	Sep 13, 1950	Bologna, Emilia Romagna, Italy	
17	Win	17–0	Gianluigi Uboldi	PTS	8	Jul 14, 1950	Velodromo Vigorelli, Milan, Lombardia, Italy	
16	Win	16–0	Giuseppe De Joanni	PTS	8	May 17, 1950	Gallarate, Lombardia, Italy	
15	Win	15–0	Djilali Bouaziz	PTS	8	May 8, 1950	Gallarate, Lombardia, Italy	
14	Win	14–0	Jan Nicolaas	PTS	10	Apr 15, 1950	Milan, Lombardia, Italy	
13	Win	13–0	Nicola Funari	PTS	8	Mar 22, 1950	Milan, Lombardia, Italy	
12	Win	12–0	Pedro Martinez	KO	2 (8)	Mar 15, 1950	Teatro Principe, Milan, Lombardia, Italy	
11	Win	11–0	Vittorio Costa	PTS	8	Mar 4, 1950	Bologna, Emilia Romagna, Italy	
10	Win	10–0	Vittorio Costa	PTS	8	Jan 31, 1950	Cagliari, Sardegna, Italy	
9	Win	9–0	Young Robert	PTS	10	Dec 15, 1949	Salle Communale, La Chaux-de-Fonds	
8	Win	8–0	Oreste Baiocco	TKO	8 (8)	Nov 30, 1949	Cagliari, Sardegna, Italy	
7	Win	7–0	Lucien Berthelier	PTS	6	Nov 23, 1949	Milan, Lombardia, Italy	
6	Win	6–0	Bruno Bisterzo	PTS	8	Oct 5, 1949	Milan, Lombardia, Italy	
5	Win	5–0	Giulio Di Rocco	PTS	6	Apr 24, 1949	Genoa, Liguria, Italy	
4	Win	4–0	Ruggero Grilli	PTS	6	Apr 12, 1949	Milan, Lombardia, Italy	
3	Win	3–0	Gaetano De Lucia	PTS	6	Mar 12, 1949	Genoa, Liguria, Italy	
2	Win	2–0	Georgescu	PTS	6	Feb 12, 1949	Genoa, Liguria, Italy	
1	Win	1–0	Nino Frangioni	PTS	6	Nov 1, 1948	Genoa, Liguria, Italy	

== Titles in boxing ==
=== Major world titles ===
- NYSAC light welterweight champion (140 lbs) (2×)
- NBA (WBA) light welterweight champion (140 lbs) (2×) (Note: NBA was renamed the WBA before his second reign.)

=== The Ring magazine titles ===
- The Ring light welterweight champion (140 lbs)

=== Regional/International titles ===
- Italian lightweight champion (135 lbs)
- European lightweight champion (135 lbs)
- European welterweight champion (147 lbs)

=== Undisputed titles ===
- Undisputed light welterweight champion (2×)

== See also ==
- Legends of Italian sport - Walk of Fame
- Lineal championship
- List of light welterweight boxing champions

== Notes and references ==
=== References ===
Sporting positions
World boxing titles
Preceded by Carlos Ortiz	WBA light welterweight champion 1 September 1960 – 14 September 1962	Succeeded by Eddie Perkins
Preceded by Carlos Ortiz	NYSAC light welterweight champion 1 September 1960 – 14 September 1962	Succeeded by Eddie Perkins
Preceded by Carlos Ortiz	Lineal light welterweight champion 1 September 1960 – 14 September 1962	Succeeded by Eddie Perkins
Preceded by Carlos Ortiz	Undisputed light welterweight champion 1 September 1960 – 14 September 1962	Succeeded by Eddie Perkins
Preceded by Eddie Perkins	WBA light welterweight champion 15 December 1962 – 24 January 1963; Retired	Vacant Title next held by Roberto Cruz
Preceded by Eddie Perkins	NYSAC light welterweight champion 15 December 1962 – 24 January 1963; Retired	Vacant Title next held by Eddie Perkins
Vacant Title last held by Jack Berg	The Ring light welterweight champion 15 December 1962 – 24 January 1963; Retired	Vacant Title next held by Eddie Perkins
Preceded by Eddie Perkins	Lineal light welterweight champion 15 December 1962 – 24 January 1963; Retired	Vacant Title next held by Eddie Perkins
Preceded by Eddie Perkins	Undisputed light welterweight champion 15 December 1962 – 24 January 1963; Retired	Vacant Title next held by Eddie Perkins
