= Medhu Ziyaaraiy =

Mausoleum in Malé, Maldives

- މެދު ޒިޔާރަތް (Dhivehi)
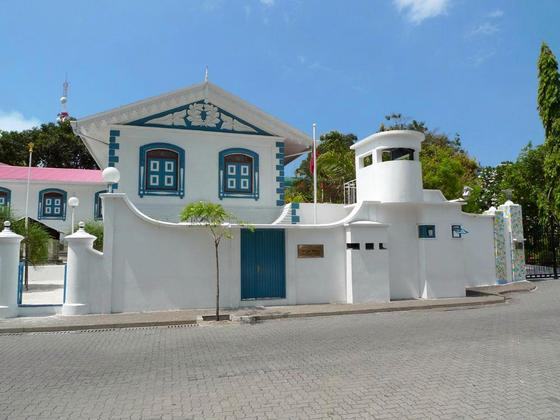
- Medhu Ziyaaraiy in 2009
- Interactive map of Medhu Ziyaaraiy
- 4.177583°N 73.512653°E
- Location: Medhuziyaarai Magu, Henveiru, Malé, Maldives

History
- Built: 1902
- Built for: Abu al-Barakat Yusuf al-Barbari

Site notes
- Owner: Government of the Maldives

Medhu Ziyaaraiy (lit. 'Central Tomb') is a historical site and mausoleum located next to Muliaage and across the street from Malé Friday Mosque.

== History ==
Medhu Ziyaaraiy was built in 1906 during the reign of Muhammad Shamsuddeen III.

Medhu Ziyaaraiy currently holds the body of Abu al-Barakat Yusuf al-Barbari, the person who converted the king of the Maldives, Dhovemi Kalaminja Siri Thiribuvana-aadiththa Maha Radun in 1153 AD.

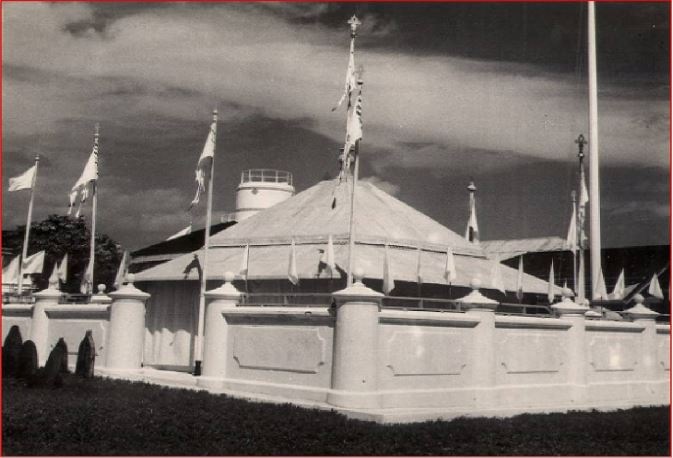
Medhu Ziyaaraiy in 1958

On 29 March 2009, it was reopened to the public which was met with criticism.

On 11 November 2022, the flag was raised at Medhu Ziyaaraiy after 30 years of not hoisting it.
