= Henveiru =

Henveiru ހެންވޭރު
- District of Malé
- Country: Maldives

Government
  - Council: Malé City Council

Population (2022)
  - Total: 34,012
- Time zone: UTC+05:00 (MST)

Henveiru (Dhivehi: ހެންވޭރު) is a district of Malé, Maldives. It is located to the east of Malé Island, and has an estimated area of 59 hectares and 34,012 inhabitants according to the 2022 Census.

== Location within Malé City ==
Henveiru is on the eastern portion of Malé Island:

== Notable Places ==
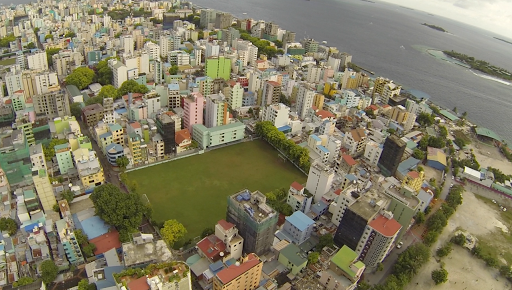
Drone shot of Henveiru Stadium

- Artificial Beach
- Henveiru Sahara (Cemetery)
- Henveiru Stadium
- Hukuru Miskiy (Friday Mosque)
- Islamic Centre
- King Salman Mosque
- Lonuziyaaraiy Park
- Maldives Police Service
- Muliaage
- People's Majlis
- President's Office
- Republic Square
- Sinamalé Bridge
- Victory Monument
