= Edy Schmidiger =

Swiss boxer

Personal information
- Full name: Ernst Schmidiger
- Nationality: Swiss
- Born: 30 November 1916

Sport
- Sport: Boxing

Edy Schmidiger (born 30 November 1916, date of death unknown) was a Swiss boxer. He competed in the men's lightweight event at the 1948 Summer Olympics.
