= Muliaage =

Official residence of the president of the Maldives

Muliaage palace
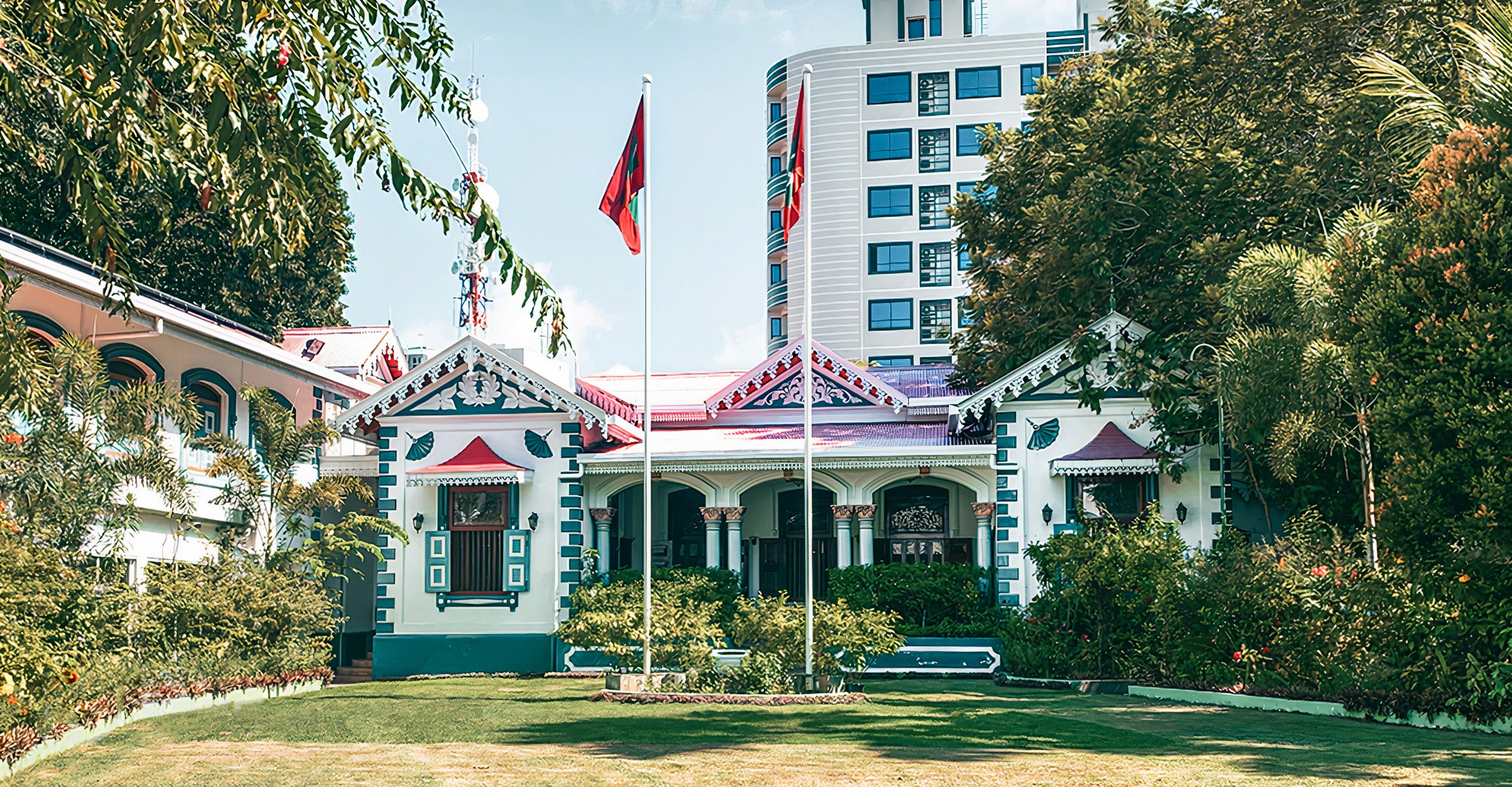
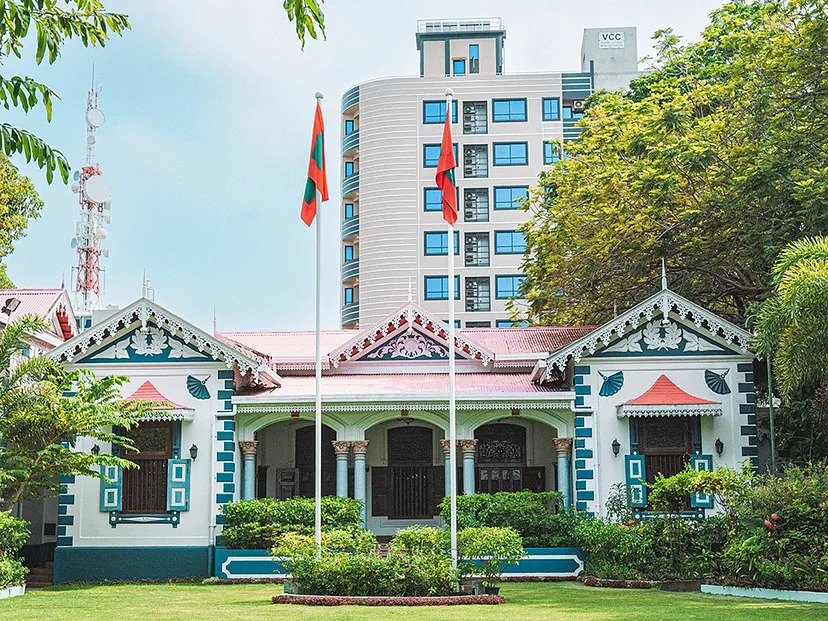
- Front view of Muliaage
- Interactive map of the Muliaage palace area
- Former names: Muleege; Henveiru Ganduvaru

General information
- Architectural style: Colonial bungalow
- Location: Muliaage, Medhuziyaarai Magu, Henveiru, Malé 20115, Maldives
- Coordinates: 4°10′39″N 73°30′45″E
- Current tenants: Mohamed Muizzu, President of the Maldives and the First Family
- Construction started: 10 February 1914; 112 years ago
- Completed: 7 December 1919; 106 years ago
- Owner: Government of the Maldives

Design and construction
- Architect: Ahmed Dhoshimeyna Kilegefan

Website
- presidency.gov.mv

The Muliaage palace (Note: Dhivehi: މުލިއާގެ, pronounced [muliˈəːɡe], also transliterated as Mulee Aage, Mulee-age, Mulee'aage, or Muleeaage. The palace was originally the house of King Hasan 'Izz ud-din's father, who was from the island of Muli in Meemu Atoll, and the house was known as Muleege (Mulige) or the Mulee House. Both Muleeaage and Muliaage has been used and both are correct.) or Muliaage is the official residence of the president of the Maldives. Muliaage, situated in Henveiru within the historic center of Malé, is located on Medhuziyaarai Magu, near significant landmarks, the Medhu Ziyaaraiy, the Malé Friday Mosque, and the Munnaru.

The residence was designed by Ahmed Dhoshimeyna Kilegefan, father of Mohamed Amin Didi in 1913, at the request of King Muhammad Shamsuddine III, for his son and heir, Hassan Izzuddine, Crown Prince of the Maldives.

== History ==
=== The Beginning ===
The construction of Muliaage was initiated in the year 1914 and completed in 1919. It was commissioned by Sultan Muhammad Shamsuddeen III for his son and heir Prince Hassan Izzuddin. It was built on the style of bungalows, in vogue during the colonial era in Ceylon and completed in preparation for the return of Prince Hassan Izzuddin to Male' in 1920 after completing his education at the Royal College of Colombo.

Muliaage, meaning the "new house of Muli", was built on the site of Mulee'ge, the ancestral home of Shamsuddeen. Muliaage was also the home of the Sultan Hasan 'Izz ud-din (or "Dhon Bandaarain" 1759–66). It was the private residence of Dhon Bandaarain's mother, Amina Dhiyo daughter of Mohamed, the Katheeb of Muli. It remained with the Huraa Dynasty rulers throughout its history. The last occupant of Muliaage was Prince Mulee'ge Manippulhu, who later ascended the throne as Sultan Muhammad Shamsuddeen III in 1892.

Neither Muliaage nor Mulee'ge ever served as a Royal Palace. However, it is located just a stone's throw away from the site of the former royal palace, now the Sultan's Park and the National Museum of Maldives. Most of the buildings in the royal palace grounds were demolished during Ibrahim Nasir's presidency in the late 1960s. As such, today the nearest one could get to a royal Maldivian palace is Muliaage in Male’ and the Utheemu Ganduvaru on the island of Utheemu.

Muliaage was occupied by Prince Hassan Izzuddin between 1920 and 1934. The house did not prove auspicious for the prince, though apparently he spent a lot of time there. It was famous throughout Male' as a place for merriment and gaiety with numerous music and dance performances organized by the young prince for his entertainment. Izzuddin however soon became the victim of a smear campaign organized by his uncle Al Ameer Abdul Majeed Rannabandeyri Kilegefaanu and cousin Hassan Fareed. Ultimately he was discredited and banished in 1934 to the isolated southerly island of Fuvahmulah where he died in 1938.

=== Rise and Fall of the First Republic ===
Following Prince Izzudin's arrest, Muliaage remained abandoned and in disuse until the second World War, when it was used as the Ministry of Home Affairs by Mohamed Amin Didi. Following the abolition of the Maldivian Monarchy in 1952, the new President Mohamed Amin Didi officially made Muliaage the Presidential Palace on January 1, 1953. Following Amin's ouster later that year it became the Prime Minister's Office under Ibrahim Faamuladheyri Kilegefaanu after the restoration of the monarchy under Sultan Muhammad Fareed Didi.

Between 1960 and 1964 Muliaage served as the residence and office of the British Government Political Agent, Humphrey Arthington-Davy. He was the first British official posted to Male. Following demonstrations and acts of sabotage directed against Arthington-Davy, he later lived mainly at his retreat in Dhoonidhoo Island across the lagoon from Male.

=== During the Second Republic ===
After a long period of disuse, the first president of the second republic, Ibrahim Nasir Rannabandeyri Kilegefan once again declared Muliaage as the Presidential Palace in 1968. Although it was the official residence of the president, Nasir only took temporary residence at Muliaage while his own house, Velaanaa'ge, was under construction. Initially, President Maumoon Abdul Gayyoom resided at Muliaage for the first two decades of his presidency. However, deeming Muliaage insufficient, Maumoom commissioned Theemuge to be built and declared it the official Presidential Palace in 1998. Muliaage was under much neglect and it served as the President's Office and later the Supreme Court during the latter years of Maumoon's presidency.

In 2008, after defeating Maumoon Abdul Gayyoom in the Maldives' first democratic multi-party elections, Mohamed Nasheed became the third president of the second republic. Nasheed was a strong critic of Maumoon's government and its alleged overspending. On these grounds, president Nasheed refused to use Theemuge because of the high costs of maintaining it as a house of residence and stayed at his own house Yaagoothu'ge for the first few months of his presidency. However, on February 4, 2009, Nasheed moved to Muliaage, once again declaring it the official residence of the Maldivian president. In 2011, Nasheed installed a solar photovoltaic energy system on the roof of Muliaage with the aim of promoting sustainable energy and sending a global message on climate leadership. After the resignation of Nasheed in February 2012, the palace became vacant.

Famous guests who stayed at Muliaage include Prime Minister Rajiv Gandhi of India under President Maumoon. Queen Elizabeth II and her husband, Prince Philip, the Duke of Edinburgh were entertained at an evening reception in 1972 by President Nasir during the couple's 2-day state visit to Male on board the Royal Yacht Britannia.

== Usage of building ==
Title	Duration	Ruler	Notes
Residence of Crown Prince Hassan Izzuddin	1920–1934	Sultan Muhammad Shamsuddeen III	
Ministry of Home Affairs	1939–?	Abdul Majeed Didi (Regent: Hassan Fareed Didi); Mohamed Amin Didi	
Presidential Palace	1953–1954	Mohamed Amin Didi	
Prime Minister's Office	1954–1968	Sultan Muhammad Fareed Didi	
Presidential Palace	1968–1998	Ibrahim Nasir; Maumoon Abdul Gayoom	Office moved to Theemuge
President's Office	?	Maumoon Abdul Gayoom	
Supreme Court of the Maldives	2008–2009	Maumoon Abdul Gayoom	Office moved to Theemuge
Official Residence of the President	2009–present	Mohamed Nasheed (2009–2012); Dr. Mohamed Waheed Hassan Manik (2012–2013) (Note: Although it was the official residence of the president, Waheed didn't live in Muliaage because it was being used as the headquarters of the Commission of National Inquiry.); Abdulla Yameen (2013–2018); Ibrahim Mohamed Solih (2018–2023); Mohamed Muizzu (2023–present)	

== Medhu Ziyaaraiy ==
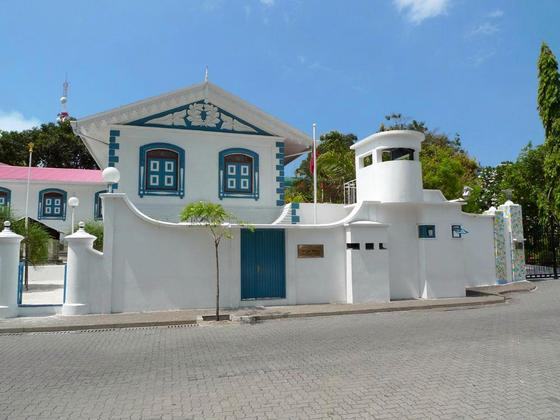
View of Medhu Ziyaaraiy tomb, with the gates of Muliaage visible on the right.

Medhu Ziyaaraiy (literally 'Central Tomb') was a part of the original Muliaage building. Today, it is an exclave of Muliaage; separate from the building. It houses the tomb of Abu al-Barakat Yusuf al-Tabrizi, who is believed to have introduced Islam to the nation in 1153. This name is mentioned in several historical artifacts and scriptures, such as the Shihabuddin Filaa Kolhu (A wooden piece with Kufic Style Arabic Scriptures on it, mentioning the name of the one who introduced Islam to Maldives in the year 1153 AD) that was placed at Hukuru Miskiyth by Sultan Shihabuddin, and is presently visible in the inscriptions in the Male Friday Mosque (The black and white scriptures at the entrance to the "Mihuraabuge" where the Imam Leads the prayer, and the lacquer work present on the top left of the entrance to the "Medhu ge", the middle section, from the Ablution area) . Furthermore, the notion that a Moroccan scholar introduced Islam to Maldives has been disproven by many historians in the past and even today, as the only source that supports the claim, which was written by Ibn Battuta in his Rihla, was proven to have false information regarding the Shahabuddin Filaa, which Ibn Battuta claimed he had read. Ibn Battuta stated in his Rihla, that he read "Al-Maqribi" in the scripture, but there is no such scripture in the Shihabuddin Filaa, which is currently Displayed in the Maldives National Museum in Male' City.

== See also ==
- Theemuge
- Hilaaleege
- History of the Maldives
- President of the Maldives
- List of Maldivian monarchs
- Royal Palaces of the Maldives
