= Alois Petřina =

Czechoslovak boxer

Personal information
- Nationality: Czechoslovak
- Born: 1926 or 1927
- Died: 17 January 1968 (aged 41)

Sport
- Country: Czechoslovakia
- Sport: Boxing

Alois Petřina (1926 or 1927 – 17 January 1968) was a Czechoslovak boxer. He competed for Czechoslovakia in the men's lightweight event at the 1948 Summer Olympics.
