= Mario Minatelli =

Italian boxer

Personal information
- Nationality: Italian
- Born: 29 June 1925; Dubrovnik, Kingdom of Serbs, Croats and Slovenes
- Died: 11 January 1990 (aged 64)

Sport
- Sport: Boxing

Mario Minatelli (29 June 1925 – 11 January 1990) was an Italian boxer. He competed in the men's lightweight event at the 1948 Summer Olympics.
