= Theemuge =

- ތީމުގެ
- Interactive map of the Theemuge area

General information
- Type: Office
- Location: Theemuge, Orchid Magu, Maafannu, Malé 20208, Maldives, Malé City, Maldives
- Coordinates: 4°10′44″N 73°30′31″E
- Current tenants: Supreme Court & High Court
- Construction started: 1992
- Completed: 1994
- Cost: $17 million
- Owner: Government of Maldives.

Technical details
- Floor count: 3

Theemuge should not be confused with the House of Theemuge - the first dynasty of Maldives.

Theemuge (Dhivehi: ތީމުގެ) is the site of the former presidential palace of Maldives in the Maafannu Ward of the capital, Malé. Upgraded to presidential standards in 1992 by then-president Maumoon Abdul Gayyoom, Theemuge served as the presidential palace until 2008, when Gayyoom was overthrown in the country's first democratic election. Mohamed Nasheed, the newly elected president deemed Theemuge of too high maintenance and re-declared Muliaage, the old presidential palace as the new Official Residence of the Maldives. Today, Theemuge houses the Supreme Court of the Maldives.

== Naming ==
Theemuge is named after the dynasty of some of the first Muslim rulers of the Maldives from the late Lunar Dynasty (1141 to 1388). Theemuge dynasty was from Soamavansa (Handhuvanha) descent. Many historians say that 'Theemuge family' was the first family to rule Maldives. If so, 17 Kings ruled in this Dynasty. According to some 'Raadhavalhi', the first King of this Dynasty is known to be 'Mahaabarana Mahaaradhun' also known as 'Koimala Kalo'.

== Legacy and Icon ==
Theemuge had become a common household name during Maumoon's reign and icon of pride for the Maldivians. The palace hosted numerous receptions on special occasions, including opening up to guests to greet the president every eid. After the former president Ibrahim Nasir's death in November 2008, he was laid in Theemuge, in a public funeral for people to come and give their respects. In 2009, after the presidential palace was moved back to Muliaage, Theemuge was opened to the public to visit and tour for that day only. It was the very first time Theemuge was opened to the public to visit and explore.

Theemuge is also a frequently visited attraction of Malé.

== See also ==
- Muliaage
