= Gene Raymond (boxer) =

Indian boxer

Personal information
- Full name: Gene Vivienne Raymond
- Nationality: Indian
- Born: 15 April 1919; Kandy, British Ceylon
- Died: 1983 (aged 63–64); Melbourne, Australia

Sport
- Sport: Boxing
- Club: Rangers Boxing Club

Gene Raymond (15 April 1919 – 1983) was an Indian boxer of Anglo-Ceylonese origin. He competed in the men's lightweight event at the 1948 Summer Olympics.
