= Manuel López (boxer) =

Argentine boxer (c. 1929–1954)

Personal information
- Nationality: Argentine
- Born: c. 1929
- Died: 9 April 1954

Sport
- Sport: Boxing

Manuel López (c. 1929 – 9 April 1954) was an Argentine boxer. He competed in the men's lightweight event at the 1948 Summer Olympics.
