= Gang In-seok =

South Korean boxer

Personal information
- Nationality: South Korean
- Born: 13 September 1926

Sport
- Sport: Boxing

Gang In-seok (born 13 September 1926) was a South Korean boxer. He competed in the men's lightweight event at the 1948 Summer Olympics.
