= Governor's Bodyguard =

- Active: 1795 - 1948
- Country: Ceylon
- Allegiance: Governor Ceylon
- Branch: Cavalry
- Role: household cavalry
- Size: Troop

The Governor's Bodyguard were the household cavalry troop of the Governor of Ceylon.

== History ==
The troop's origins lay in the practice of the British Military Governors utilising mounted escorts from British Army units in an ad hoc basis when moving around the country since 1795 for their personal protection during times of war and peace. With the formation of the Ceylon Mounted Rifles in 1887, the troopers for a permanent Governor's Bodyguard was provided from the CMR. The Troop adopted a full dress uniform, which consisted of white helmet, scarlet tunic, white breeches, jack boots and were armed with lancers. The unit became a ceremonial guard, escorting the Governor on state occasions. After the Ceylon Mounted Rifles were disbanded in 1938 as part of the conversion of horsed regiments to mechanised cavalry in the British Army; mounted troopers for the Governor's Bodyguard were supplied by the Ceylon Police Force which continued to maintain horses for mounted policing and transport. They retained the same uniform and lancers. In 1948, the unit took part in the independence celebrations. With the office of Governor-General replacing that of Governor, the unit was no longer referred to as the Governor's Bodyguard.

The tradition continues to this day by the Sri Lanka Police Mounted Division, which provides ceremonial mounted escorts to the President of Sri Lanka on state occasions, visiting heads of state and for Ambassadors when presenting credentials to the President. Mounted Police officers wear a red tunic, a dark blue pith helmet, golden cross belt, dark blue pantaloons, white gauntlets and carry lances with the national flag.
