= Billy Thompson (boxer) =

British boxer (1926–2009)

Personal information
- Nickname: The Pocket Adonis
- Nationality: British
- Born: 20 October 1926 New Silksworth, Sunderland, County Durham, England
- Died: 4 January 2009 (aged 85) Denaby Main, South Yorkshire, England
- Weight: Lightweight

Boxing career

Boxing record
- Total fights: 63
- Wins: 46
- Win by KO: 21
- Losses: 13
- Draws: 4

Billy Thompson (20 October 1926 – 4 January 2009) was a British boxer who was British lightweight champion between 1947 and 1951, and European champion from 1948 to 1949.

== Career ==
Born in New Silksworth, Sunderland, Thompson lived for most of his life in Thurnscoe, South Yorkshire where he found work as a miner. He boxed out of the Hickleton Main ABC and won a national schoolboy title at the age of 13, the Northern Counties ABA flyweight championship, and the Air Training Corps title, and the ABA 1944 lightweight title before turning professional.

He made his professional debut in October 1945 after joining Solomon's Gym in London, and won his first 20 fights, all within the space of a year. In September 1946 he met Stan Hawthorne for the vacant Northern Area title at Anfield, the fight also an eliminator for the British title, losing a points decision.

In October 1947, after Ronnie James had vacated, he met Hawthorne again at Anfield for the British title. This time Thompson dominated the fight, knocking Hawthorne down three times in the second round, and the referee stopped the fight in the third round, making Thompson the new British champion. On his return to Thurnscoe he was greeted by a cheering crowd and a street procession from his house to Hickleton Colliery where he gave a speech to the crowd that had gathered. He became known as 'The Pocket Adonis' due to his impressive physique.

In February 1948, Thompson challenged for Roberto Proietti's European title at the Harringay Arena; The fight went the full 15 rounds, with Thompson taking a points decision to become European champion. He defended the title in July against Pierre Montane at White City Stadium, the fight ending in a draw. Three months later he faced Canadian Arthur King for the vacant British Empire title in Manchester, but Thompson retired at the end of the seventh round with a cut above his eye impairing his vision. In January 1949 he made a second defence of his European title against Belgian Joseph Preys, winning on points over 15 rounds. The two met again two months later in a non-title fight, the bout ending in a draw. In May 1949 he defended both his British and European titles against Harry Hughes at Celtic Park, stopping the challenger in the fifth round. In July he made a fourth defence of the European title against Kid Dussart, losing it after being disqualified in the sixth round for hitting low after being warned three times. The disqualification was followed by a £750 fine, which was reduced to £500 on appeal.

Thompson attempted to regain the European title in January 1950 against Roberto Proietti, but lost on points. After adopting a meat-free diet to get down the lightweight limit, he successfully defended his British title for a second time in July against Tommy McGovern, winning the Lonsdale Belt outright. He made a second attempt to regain the European title in February 1951 when he met Montane again after Proietti vacated, but was knocked out by the Frenchman in the twelfth round. In August 1951 he faced McGovern at Wandsworth Stadium to try to regain his British title, but was knocked out after 45 seconds of the first round, after a struggle to make the weight that had reportedly led him to spending four hours in a Turkish bath the night before the fight had left him weakened. He was subsequently suspended by the BBBofC for six months for not being in a fit condition to fight, and declared that he would never fight again at lightweight.

Thompson fought five more times, now at welterweight, before announcing his retirement on 21 January 1954 due to recurring eye problems. He went on to become a boxing trainer, working with Brian Blessed among others. He continued to work as a miner at Hickleton and Houghton Main collieries until a chest infection forced him to retire.

Thompson married Marjorie Lloyd at Doncaster Register Office on 5 May 1948. He died on 4 January 2009 at the Flower Park Residential Home in Denaby Main, aged 85.
