= Eddie Grey =

Sri Lankan boxer and police officer

Edward Ian "Eddie" Gray
- Born: 21 December 1918; Ceylon
- Died: 21 September 2004 (aged 85); Melbourne, Australia
- Other name: Eddie
- Police career
- Allegiance: Ceylon
- Department: Ceylon Police Force
- Service years: 1937 to 1957
- Rank: Inspector of Police
- Other work: Executive at Mercantile Credit

Edward Ian Gray (21 December 1918 – 21 September 2004) was a Sri Lankan sportsman and a police officer. Gray was a former Inspector of Police (IP) and the first Ceylonese head of the Police Mounted Section. He also served as the Secretary of the National Olympic Committee of Ceylon.

== Education ==
He was educated at Royal College, Colombo, where he was a Senior Prefect and Captain of the Athletics team, Boxing team and Rugby team.

== Police career ==
After completing his schooling he joined the Ceylon Police Force and was appointed as a Sub-Inspector of Police at his first duty station in Kandy. When World War II broke out Gray was the Officer in Charge (OIC) of the Koggala police station, where the RAF Koggala was situated and served as a critical base for Allied operations in the Indian Ocean. He later served as OIC of the harbor police at the Colombo port.

Joining the Police Stables he went on to become the first Ceylonese to head the unit as its OIC. On the morning of 22 March 1952 Prime Minister D. S. Senanayake was riding the police mare ‘Chitra’ on the Galle Face Green when he suffered a stroke and fell. He was accompanied by IGP Sir Richard Aluwihare, G.G. Ponnambalam and Inspector Eddie Gray at the time who took him to a nursing home, where he died several hours later.

Prior to his early retirement he served as the OIC of Colombo Fort police station. During his police service he received the Ceylon Police Medal for Meritorious Service, Defence Medal 1939-45, Ceylon Police Independence Medal and the Service Medal of the Order of St John. After his retirement he was an executive at Mercantile Credit until 1974 when he left for Australia.

== Sports ==
A boxer he won his weight class at the Stubs Shield Boxing Meet for schools and retained the title of Light Weight Champion of Ceylon for many years. Gray was a member of the Ceylon contingent to the 1948 Olympic Games in London, where he competed in lightweight boxing competition and was a team mate of Duncan White, who won silver in the Men's 400 metres hurdles event. Gray went on to represent Ceylon in the lightweight boxing competition at the 1950 British Empire Games in Auckland.

He served as the Secretary of the National Olympic Committee of Ceylon and was also an excellent Horseman and Polo player.

== 1948 Olympic results ==
Below are the results of Edward Gray, a lightweight boxer from Ceylon, who competed at the 1948 London Olympics:

- Round of 32: defeated Ezz El-Din Nasir (Egypt) by a first-round disqualification
- Round of 16: lost to Eddie Haddad (Canada) by decision
