= Tommy McGovern =

English boxer (1924–1989)

Personal information
- Nationality: British
- Born: Thomas Henry McGovern; 5 February 1924 Lambeth, London, England
- Died: 1 February 1989 (aged 64)
- Weight: Lightweight

Boxing career

Boxing record
- Total fights: 67
- Wins: 46
- Win by KO: 11
- Losses: 17
- Draws: 4

Thomas Henry McGovern (5 February 1924 – 1 February 1989) was a British boxer who was British lightweight champion between 1951 and 1952 and fought for the European title.

== Career ==
=== Amateur career ===
Born in Lambeth, London, and based in Bermondsey where he worked selling fish, McGovern was a successful amateur, competing internationally, was British Army lightweight champion, and in 1944 was described by Joe Louis as the finest British prospect he had seen after seeing him fight in services competitions in Italy.

He won the 1943 Amateur Boxing Association British lightweight title, when boxing out of the Fitzroy Lodge & Lynn ABC.

=== Professional career ===
After consideration of his application for a professional licence was deferred from December 1946 until three months later, causing the cancellation of his planned debut fight, he started his pro career in the United States in April 1947 with a points win over Ben Melendez. He won 11 of 15 fights in North America before returning to the UK.

In August 1948 he beat George Daly on points at Selhurst Park and again in July 1949 at the same venue, this time stopping him in the sixth round, to take the British South Eastern Area Lightweight Title. In January 1950 he beat Finnish champion Elis Ask. In April 1950 he beat Peter Fallon at the Royal Albert Hall in a British title eliminator, setting up a challenge for Billy Thompson's title in July. Thompson won on points to retain the title. McGovern closed the year with a points win over Tommy Barnham to take the vacant BBBofC Southern Area lightweight title.

He got another shot at Thompson's British title in August 1951 when the two met at Wandsworth Stadium. This time McGovern knocked Thompson out in just 45 seconds to win the title.

In March 1952 McGovern challenged for Jorgen Johansen's European title in Copenhagen; The fight went the full 15 rounds, ending in a draw, with even the Danish press believing McGovern should have been given the verdict. A month later he lost to Hocine Khalfi, and in June beat Cliff Anderson in a final eliminator for the British Empire title.

McGovern made the first defence of his British title in July 1952 against Frank Johnson at the King's Hall in Manchester. Johnson took him the full 15 rounds and got the points verdict to take the title. In January 1953 he faced Joe Lucy in a final eliminator for the British title, but lost on points, a decision that reportedly led him consider writing to his MP to challenge. In April 1953 he lost a close fight on points to French champion Jacques Prigent. He got a second chance to regain the title in September 1953 when he faced Lucy again, but once more lost on points. This was his final fight. In his 67-fight professional career he was never stopped by an opponent.

McGovern made his acting debut, playing himself, in the 1949 boxing themed British film, No Way Back.

In 1954 McGovern was imprisoned for six months after being found guilty of three counts of receiving stolen goods.
