= Eduardo Cornejo =

Chilean boxer (c. 1929–1998)

Eduardo Cornejo Diaz
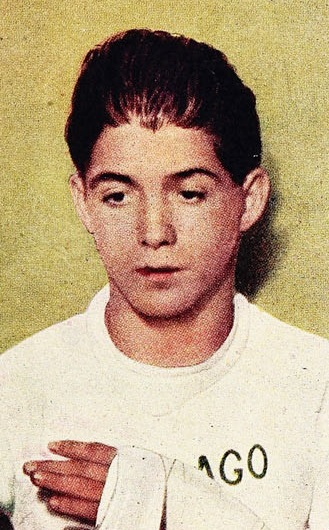

Personal information
- Nationality: Chilean
- Born: c. 1929
- Died: 23 November 1998 Santiago, Chile

Sport
- Sport: Boxing

Eduardo Cornejo (c. 1929 – 23 November 1998) was a Chilean boxer. He competed in the men's lightweight event at the 1948 Summer Olympics.
