= Tauno Rinkinen =

Finnish boxer

Personal information
- Nationality: Finnish
- Born: 23 July 1924; Sortavala, Russia
- Died: 3 February 1993 (aged 68); Helsinki, Finland

Sport
- Sport: Boxing

Tauno Rinkinen (23 July 1924 – 3 February 1993) was a Finnish boxer. He competed in the men's lightweight event at the 1948 Summer Olympics. At the 1948 Summer Olympics, he lost to Maxie McCullagh of Ireland.
