= Izzuddine, Crown Prince of the Maldives =

Hassan Izzudheen
- Crown Prince of the Maldives
- Hassan Izzuddine, Crown Prince 1931
- Born: Hassan Izzudheen; 11 July 1901; Royal palace, Fura Malé, Maldive Islands
- Died: 25 September 1940 (aged 39); Fuvahmulah
- Burial: 27 September 1940; Fuvahmulah Friday Mosque
- Issue: Fareeda Izzudheen; Saeeda Izzudheen
Names
- Hassan Izzudheen ibn Sultan Muhammad Shamsuddine Iskandar
- Dynasty: Huraa
- Father: Muhammad Shamsuddeen III
- Mother: Sitti
- Religion: Islam

Al Ameer Hassan Izzudheen, Crown Prince of the Maldives (Hassan Izzudheen; 11 July 1901 – 25 September 1940) was the son of the Sultan Muhammad Shamsuddeen III. He was named the Crown Prince of the Maldives on February 8, 1931, by his father.

He studied at Royal College Colombo in Ceylon. After spending several years in Ceylon (Sri Lanka), he came back in 1920 and took up residence at Muliaage.

Muliaa’ge was occupied by Prince Hassan Izzudheen between 1920 and 1934. The house did not prove auspicious for the prince, though he apparently spent a lot of time there. It was famous throughout Male’, as a place for merriment and gaiety with numerous music and dance performances organised by the young prince for his entertainment. Izzudheen however soon became the victim of a smear campaign organized by his uncle Al Ameer Abdul Majeed Rannabandeyri Kilegefaanu and cousin Hassan Fareed. Ultimately he was discredited and banished in 1934 to the isolated southerly island of Fuvahmulah where he died in 1938.
