= Izudin Dervić =

Icelandic footballer

Personal information
- Full name: Izudin Daði Dervić
- Date of birth: 22 February 1963 (age 63)
- Place of birth: Banja Luka, SFR Yugoslavia
- Position: Defender

Senior career*
Years	Team	Apps	(Gls)
1989–1990	Olimpija Ljubljana	6	(0)
1990	Selfoss	15	(8)
1991	FH	17	(1)
1992	Valur	17	(0)
1993–1995	KR	51	(9)
1996–1997	Leiftur	34	(5)
1998–1999	Þróttur R.	20	(0)
1999	Valur	10	(0)
2001	Barðaströnd	8	(0)
2002	Fjölnir	7	(0)

International career
1993–1995	Iceland	14	(0)

Managerial career
- 2004–2005: Haukar
- 2010: Afturelding
- 2011–2013: Leiknir Fáskrúðsfirði
- * Club domestic league appearances and goals

Izudin Daði Dervić (born 22 February 1963) is a former footballer. Born in Bosnia, he represented Iceland at international level.

== Early life and career ==
Dervić was born in Bosnia and grew up in Prnjavor where he first started playing football. He later moved to Slovenia where he played for NK Olimpija Ljubljana before moving to Iceland in 1990 to play for Selfoss.

== International career ==
Dervić received an Icelandic citizenship in May 1993 and took up the middle name Daði. Three weeks later he was selected to the Icelandic national team. He debuted for the team against Russia on 2 June 1993, becoming the first naturalized citizen to play for Iceland. He earned a total of 14 caps, scoring no goals. His final international was an August 1995 European Championship qualification match against Switzerland.
