= Ivor Germain =

Barbados boxer (1923–1982)

Personal information
- Nickname: Kid German
- Born: Ivan Burton Massiah; 8 July 1923 Barbados
- Died: 1982 Manchester, England
- Weight: light/welterweight

Boxing career
- Stance: Southpaw

Boxing record
- Total fights: 54
- Wins: 31 (KO 13)
- Losses: 20 (KO 6)
- Draws: 3

Ivor Germain (8 July 1923 – 1982) was a Barbadian professional light/welterweight boxer of the 1940s and 1950s who won the Barbados lightweight title, and British Empire lightweight title, his professional fighting weight varied from 133 lb (60 kg; 9 st 7 lb), i.e. lightweight to 143 lb (65 kg; 10 st 3 lb), i.e. welterweight.

Germain died in Manchester, England in 1982.
