= Joseph Vissers =

Belgian boxer

Olympic medal record

Men's Boxing

Representing Belgium
Silver medal – second place	1948 London	Lightweight

Joseph ("Jos") Vissers (28 November 1928 – 18 April 2006) was a Belgian boxer who competed in the Lightweight division during his career.

== Amateur career ==
Vissers was the Olympic Silver Medalist at lightweight in London in 1948, losing to Gerald Dreyer of South Africa in the final.

== 1948 Olympic results ==
Below are the results of Joseph Vissers, a Belgian lightweight boxer, who competed at the 1948 London Olympics:

- Round of 32: defeated Billy Barber (Australia) on points
- Round of 16: defeated Edy Schmidiger (Switzerland) on points
- Quarterfinal: defeated Eddie Haddad (Canada) on points
- Semifinal: defeated Wallace Smith (United States) on points
- Final: lost to Gerald Dreyer (South Africa) on points (was awarded the silver medal)

== Pro career ==
Vissers turned pro in 1948 and fought primarily in Belgium, retiring in 1951 after an unsuccessful pro career, having won 5 and lost 6 with 3 KO.
