= Eddie Haddad =

Canadian boxer (1928–1978)

Eddie Haddad (February 20, 1928 in Winnipeg, Manitoba – August 14, 1978 in Chilliwack, British Columbia) was a boxer primarily active in the 1940s in Manitoba and British Columbia. His first major international tournament was at the 1948 Olympic Games as a lightweight boxer where he lost in the quarterfinals to the eventual gold medalist, Joseph Vissers of Belgium. Haddad was also a Canadian team member of the 1950 British Empire Games (now called the Commonwealth Games).

In local amateur boxing in British Columbia one of his important achievements was the 1948 Golden Boy award.

== 1948 Olympic results ==
Below are the results of Eddie Haddad, a Canadian lightweight boxer who competed at the 1948 London Olympics:

- Round of 32: defeated Ezz El-Din Nasir (Egypt) on points
- Round of 16: defeated Edward Grey (Ceylon) on points
- Quarterfinal: lost to Joseph Vissers (Belgium) on points

Haddad is an inductee in the Military, Manitoba and the Greater Victoria Sports Halls of Fame.

== Hall of Fame inductions ==
In 2010, Haddad was one of 15 to be the core group of inductees to the BC Amateur Boxing Hall of Fame. Some others of note were Freddy Stephen Fuller, Frank Albert Scott and Dale Walters in the boxer category

Haddad was inducted into the Manitoba Sports Hall of Fame in 2008.
