= Øivind Breiby =

Norwegian boxer

Personal information
- Nationality: Norwegian
- Born: 15 November 1917; Oslo, Norway
- Died: 5 November 1990 (aged 72); Oslo, Norway

Sport
- Sport: Boxing

Øivind Breiby (15 November 1917 – 5 November 1990) was a Norwegian boxer. He competed in the men's lightweight event at the 1948 Summer Olympics.
