= Piet van Klaveren =

Dutch boxer (1930–2008)

Van Klaveren in 1952

Pieter ("Piet") van Klaveren (born 1 September 1930 in Rotterdam, South Holland, died 28 April 2008) was a boxer from the Netherlands, who competed for his native country at the 1952 Summer Olympics in Helsinki, Finland. There he was stopped in the quarterfinals of the Men's Light Welterweight (-63.5 kg) division by Terence Milligan of Ireland. He is the younger brother of Bep van Klaveren, Olympic boxing champion in 1928. Both Van Klaveren and his twin Wim made it to the 1947 lightweight finals of the province of South Holland, in which he bested his brother.
