= Azzedine Boukerche =

Canadian electrical engineer

Azzedine Boukerche is a Distinguished University Professor [Professeur Eminent] and Senior Canada Research Chair at the University of Ottawa, Ontario, Canada.

== Career ==
Boukerche is a founding director of PARADISE Research Laboratory at Ottawa University. Prior to it, he served as a faculty of the McGill University School of Computer Science, the University of North Texas, and was a visiting professor to Polytechnique Montréal and senior scientist at the Simulation Sciences Division of the Metron Corporation. Boukerche serves as an Associate Editor for the International Journal of Wireless Communication & Mobile Computing, the IEEE Wireless Communication Magazine, the Journal of Parallel and Distributed Computing, and the SCS Transactions on Simulation.

== Awards and recognitions ==
Boukerche is a fellow of the American Association for the Advancement of Science (2012) and the Engineering Institute of Canada (2013). In 2015, the Institute of Electrical and Electronics Engineers have awarded Boukerche with the C. C. Gotlieb Computer Medal for his important contributions to the field of mobility management for wireless networks and mobile systems at the Canadian Conference on Electrical and Computer Engineering.

Boukerche was named a Fellow of the Institute of Electrical and Electronics Engineers (IEEE) in 2015 for his contributions to communication protocols for distributed mobile computing and wireless sensor networks.
