= Alberto Boullosa =

Uruguayan boxer (1925–1986)

Personal information
- Full name: Alberto Luis Boullosa Dobal
- Born: 17 May 1925 Montevideo, Uruguay
- Died: 4 May 1986 (aged 60) Montevideo, Uruguay

Sport
- Sport: Boxing

Alberto Luis Boullosa Dobal (17 May 1925 – 4 May 1986) was a Uruguayan boxer. He competed in the men's lightweight event at the 1948 Summer Olympics. Boullosa died in Montevideo on 4 May 1986, at the age of 60.
