= Raúl Zumbano =

Brazilian boxer

Personal information
- Born: 14 October 1925; São Paulo, Brazil
- Died: 8 November 2001 (aged 76)

Sport
- Sport: Boxing

Raúl Zumbano (14 October 1925 – 8 November 2001) was a Brazilian boxer. He competed in the men's lightweight event at the 1948 Summer Olympics.
