= Wallace Smith (boxer) =

American boxer

Wallace "Bud" Smith

Personal information
- Nationality: American
- Born: April 2, 1929 Cincinnati, Ohio, U.S.
- Died: July 10, 1973 (aged 49) Cincinnati, Ohio, U.S.
- Height: 5 ft 6 1/2 in (169 cm)
- Weight: Lightweight

Boxing career
- Stance: Orthodox

Boxing record
- Total fights: 61
- Wins: 31
- Win by KO: 18
- Losses: 24
- Draws: 6
- No contests: 0

Wallace "Bud" Smith (April 2, 1924 – July 10, 1973) was an Undisputed World lightweight boxing champion in 1955, who also competed in the 1948 Olympic Games. His trainer was John Joiner of Cincinnati, and his manager was Vic Marsillo. Smith was murdered in 1973.

== Amateur career ==
Born in Cincinnati, Ohio, Smith was the 1947 A.A.U. Featherweight Champion. He won Chicago's 1948 lightweight Golden Gloves inter-city tournament with a furious attack against Luis Ortiz, achieving a knockout in 2:45 of the second round. He represented the United States at the 1948 Olympic Games in the lightweight division. Smith defeated Chuck Davey of Michigan State University, to earn a spot on the team.

On August 24, 1949, he defeated Joe Discepoli in a ten-round unanimous decision in Cincinnati to take the USA Ohio State Lightweight Championship. He reportedly ended his amateur career with a 52–4 record.

== Professional career ==
Smith turned pro on November 29, 1948, with a first-round knockout of Torpedo Tinsley at Music Hall in Cincinnati. Over the next seven years, Smith established himself as one of the world's top lightweights with victories over top-rated Red Top Davis, Orlando Zulueta, and Arthur Persley.

On November 20, 1954, Smith knocked out Arthur Persley in nine rounds in Miami on his way to his 1955 title shot.

=== Defeating Orlando Zulueta, May, December 1953 ===
On May 5, 1953, Smith first defeated Cuban prodigy Orlando Zulueta in a ten-round unanimous decision at Cincinnati Gardens. On December 11, 1953, Smith defeated Zulueta again in a ten-round Unanimous Decision at Madison Square Garden. The win helped Smith earn his much desired title bout against Jimmy Carter, as Zuleta was the number two contender for the lightweight crown at the time. In a somewhat close match before a small crowd of only 2,991, Smith's aggressiveness and solid punching won him the match, though Zulueta scored frequently with quick left jabs to the head and rights to the body.

=== Taking the World Lightweight Championship, June 1955 ===
On June 29, 1955, Smith beat the 4-1 odds against him and defeated 3-time world lightweight champion Jimmy Carter in a fifteen-round split decision at Boston Garden to take the title. The fight was fierce and bloody and only 1,983 fans turned out for the contest between the black contestants who were not especially well known. Carter needed fifteen stitches over his eyes to mend from the rough bout, in which he likely took the worst damage of his career. Even Smith needed three stitches to recover from the bout.

==== Single defense of the title, October 1955 ====
Four months later on October 19, 1955, he successfully defended the title against Carter in Cincinnati, winning in a fifteen-round unanimous decision. A national TV audience was unable to see the announcement of the final decision, because one of the judges, Joe Blink, had difficulty in adding up his scorecard, in what Sports Illustrated described as "the long, long count"

=== Losing the World Lightweight Championship, August 1956 ===
On August 24, 1956, Smith lost his title in an upset to Joe Brown in a fifteen-round split decision in New Orleans. Smith was down twice in the fourteenth round. The Associated Press had Smith ahead eight rounds to seven, though the officials gave him a greater lead, and Smith may have won the bout if not for suffering a broken right hand in the second round. In a rematch with Brown on February 13, 1957, Smith lost to Brown in an eleventh-round TKO in Miami. Smith went on to fight one more year, ending his career after losing 11 straight fights, half by knockout.

== Life after boxing ==
Smith formally retired from boxing in 1959. The years passed by, and Smith dropped out of the public spotlight. His life was far from an easy one, with several brushes with the law, but the good-natured Smith was a popular figure in his neighborhood.

== Murder ==
On July 10, 1973, Smith saw a man beating up a woman in Cincinnati and stepped in. After a struggle, the man pulled a gun and shot Smith in the head, killing him.

== Professional boxing record ==
61 fights	31 wins	24 losses
By knockout	18	7
By decision	13	17
Draws	6	

No.	Result	Record	Opponent	Type	Round	Date	Location	Notes
61	Loss	31–24–6	Gomeo Brennan	TKO	5 (10)	Apr 1, 1958	Auditorium, Miami Beach, Florida, U.S.	
60	Loss	31–23–6	Duilio Loi	KO	9 (10)	Mar 1, 1958	Palazzo dello Sport (Pad. 3 Fiera), Milan, Lombardia, Italy	
59	Loss	31–22–6	Al Nevarez	UD	10	Feb 11, 1958	Auditorio Municipal, Ciudad Juarez, Chihuahua, Mexico	
58	Loss	31–21–6	Bobby Scanlon	TKO	10 (10)	Oct 31, 1957	Civic Auditorium, San Francisco, California, U.S.	
57	Loss	31–20–6	Cisco Andrade	TKO	9 (10)	Jul 25, 1957	Olympic Auditorium, Los Angeles, California, U.S.	
56	Loss	31–19–6	Mickey Crawford	UD	10	May 23, 1957	I.M.A. Auditorium, Flint, Michigan, U.S.	
55	Loss	31–18–6	Joe Brown	TKO	11 (15)	Feb 13, 1957	Auditorium, Miami Beach, Florida, U.S.	For NYSAC, NBA, and The Ring lightweight titles
54	Loss	31–17–6	Joe Brown	SD	15	Aug 24, 1956	Municipal Auditorium, New Orleans, Louisiana, U.S.	Lost NYSAC, NBA, and The Ring lightweight titles
53	Loss	31–16–6	Joe Brown	UD	10	May 2, 1956	Sam Houston Coliseum, Houston, Texas, U.S.	
52	Loss	31–15–6	Tony DeMarco	TKO	9 (10)	Mar 5, 1956	Boston Garden, Boston, Massachusetts, U.S.	
51	Loss	31–14–6	Larry Boardman	SD	10	Feb 7, 1956	Boston Garden, Boston, Massachusetts, U.S.	
50	Win	31–13–6	Jimmy Carter	UD	15	Oct 19, 1955	Cincinnati Gardens, Cincinnati, Ohio, U.S.	Retained NYSAC, NBA, and The Ring lightweight titles
49	Win	30–13–6	Jimmy Carter	SD	15	Jun 29, 1955	Boston Garden, Boston, Massachusetts, U.S.	Won NYSAC, NBA, and The Ring lightweight titles
48	Draw	29–13–6	Johnny Gonsalves	SD	10	Jan 8, 1955	Bayfront Park Auditorium, Miami, Florida, U.S.	
47	Win	29–13–5	Arthur Persley	KO	9 (10)	Nov 20, 1955	Bayfront Park Auditorium, Miami, Florida, U.S.	
46	Loss	28–13–5	Joe Miceli	SD	10	Sep 11, 1955	Auditorium, Miami Beach, Florida, U.S.	
45	Win	28–12–5	Rafel Lastre	KO	7 (10)	Aug 31, 1955	Auditorium, Miami Beach, Florida, U.S.	
44	Win	27–12–5	Rafel Lastre	TKO	9 (10)	Jul 27, 1955	Auditorium, Miami Beach, Florida, U.S.	
43	Loss	26–12–5	Johnny Gonsalves	MD	10	May 1, 1955	Madison Square Garden, New York City, New York, U.S.	
42	Loss	26–11–5	Joe Miceli	KO	5 (10)	Feb 20, 1955	Madison Square Garden, New York City, New York, U.S.	
41	Win	26–10–5	Orlando Zulueta	UD	10	Dec 11, 1954	Madison Square Garden, New York City, New York, U.S.	
40	Win	25–10–5	Billy Hazel	KO	1 (8)	Nov 5, 1954	Laurel Garden, Newark, New Jersey, U.S.	
39	Win	24–10–5	Arthur King	TKO	5 (10)	Sep 14, 1954	Eastern Parkway Arena, Brooklyn, New York City, New York, U.S.	
38	Win	23–10–5	Charley Spicer	RTD	6 (10)	Aug 24, 1954	Eastern Parkway Arena, Brooklyn, New York City, New York, U.S.	
37	Win	22–10–5	Carl Coates	TKO	6 (10)	Aug 3, 1954	Eastern Parkway Arena, Brooklyn, New York City, New York, U.S.	
36	Win	21–10–5	Johnny Williams	KO	1 (6)	Jun 26, 1954	Madison Square Garden, New York City, New York, U.S.	
35	Draw	20–10–5	Luther Rawlings	MD	10	May 19, 1954	Auditorium, Miami Beach, Florida, U.S.	
34	Win	20–10–4	Orlando Zulueta	UD	10	May 5, 1954	Cincinnati Gardens, Cincinnati, Ohio, U.S.	
33	Loss	19–10–4	Orlando Zulueta	SD	10	Mar 23, 1954	Eastern Parkway Arena, Brooklyn, New York City, New York, U.S.	
32	Draw	19–9–4	Johnny Saxton	SD	10	Mar 15, 1954	Auditorium, Miami Beach, Florida, U.S.	
31	Win	19–9–3	Len Dittmar	TKO	5 (12)	Sep 15, 1953	Sydney Stadium, Sydney, New South Wales, Australia	
30	Loss	18–9–3	George Barnes	PTS	12	Aug 18, 1953	Sydney Stadium, Sydney, New South Wales, Australia	
29	Loss	18–8–3	George Barnes	PTS	12	Jun 6, 1953	West Melbourne Stadium, Melbourne, Victoria, Australia	
28	Win	18–7–3	Frank Flannery	PTS	12	May 16, 1953	West Melbourne Stadium, Melbourne, Victoria, Australia	
27	Win	17–7–3	James Montgomery	PTS	8	Apr 7, 1953	Rhode Island Auditorium, Providence, Rhode Island, U.S.	
26	Win	16–7–3	Miguel Mendivil	TKO	2 (8)	Mar 4, 1953	Laurel Garden, Newark, New Jersey, U.S.	
25	Win	15–7–3	Teddy Davis	SD	8	Jan 1, 1953	Laurel Garden, Newark, New Jersey, U.S.	
24	Loss	14–7–3	Miguel Mendivil	PTS	8	Nov 27, 1951	Laurel Garden, Newark, New Jersey, U.S.	
23	Loss	14–6–3	Tommy Campbell	MD	10	Sep 11, 1951	Municipal Stadium, Davenport, Iowa, U.S.	
22	Draw	14–5–3	Orlando Zulueta	PTS	8	Jul 23, 1951	Meadowbrook Bowl, Newark, New Jersey, U.S.	
21	Loss	14–5–2	Virgil Akins	PTS	8	Apr 17, 1951	Kiel Auditorium, Saint Louis, Missouri, U.S.	
20	Draw	14–4–2	Dave Marsh	PTS	8	Apr 10, 1951	Cincinnati Gardens, Cincinnati, Ohio, U.S.	
19	Loss	14–4–1	Virgil Akins	PTS	10	Apr 4, 1951	Arena, Saint Louis, Missouri, U.S.	
18	Win	14–3–1	Frankie Betts	TKO	2 (6)	Mar 6, 1951	Cincinnati Gardens, Cincinnati, Ohio, U.S.	
17	Loss	13–3–1	Danny Womber	PTS	8	Nov 8, 1950	Chicago Stadium, Chicago, Illinois, U.S.	
16	Draw	13–2–1	Jesse Underwood	MD	10	Jun 14, 1950	Cincinnati Gardens, Cincinnati, Ohio, U.S.	
15	Win	13–2	Jay Watkins	UD	10	May 3, 1950	Cincinnati Gardens, Cincinnati, Ohio, U.S.	
14	Loss	12–2	Jimmy Carter	UD	10	Mar 28, 1950	Music Hall Arena, Cincinnati, Ohio, U.S.	
13	Win	12–1	Giuseppe Colasanti	UD	10	Feb 7, 1950	Cincinnati Gardens, Cincinnati, Ohio, U.S.	
12	Win	11–1	Paulie Brooks	KO	4 (10)	Dec 13, 1949	Music Hall Arena, Cincinnati, Ohio, U.S.	
11	Win	10–1	Tommy Campbell	MD	10	Nov 14, 1949	Music Hall Arena, Cincinnati, Ohio, U.S.	
10	Loss	9–1	Paulie Brooks	MD	10	Oct 25, 1949	Cincinnati Gardens, Cincinnati, Ohio, U.S.	
9	Win	9–0	Jay Watkins	KO	4 (10)	Oct 5, 1949	Music Hall Arena, Cincinnati, Ohio, U.S.	
8	Win	8–0	Don Bowman	KO	1 (10)	Sep 20, 1949	Parkway Arena, Cincinnati, Ohio, U.S.	
7	Win	7–0	Joe Discepoli	UD	10	Aug 24, 1949	Parkway Arena, Cincinnati, Ohio, U.S.	Won Ohio State lightweight title
6	Win	6–0	Jesse Underwood	UD	8	Jul 11, 1949	Parkway Arena, Cincinnati, Ohio, U.S.	
5	Win	5–0	Don Keeling	KO	2 (6)	May 23, 1949	Cincinnati Gardens, Cincinnati, Ohio, U.S.	
4	Win	4–0	Doug Medley	PTS	8	Mar 28, 1949	Music Hall Arena, Cincinnati, Ohio, U.S.	
3	Win	3–0	Doug Medley	PTS	6	Feb 28, 1949	Cincinnati Gardens, Cincinnati, Ohio, U.S.	
2	Win	2–0	Joe Kelly	TKO	1 (6)	Jan 24, 1949	Music Hall Arena, Cincinnati, Ohio, U.S.	
1	Win	1–0	Torpedo Tinsley	KO	1 (6)	Nov 9, 1948	Music Hall Arena, Cincinnati, Ohio, U.S.	

== Titles in boxing ==
=== Major world titles ===
- NYSAC lightweight champion (135 lbs)
- NBA (WBA) lightweight champion (135 lbs)

=== The Ring magazine titles ===
- The Ring lightweight champion (135 lbs)

=== Regional/International titles ===
- Ohio State lightweight champion (135 lbs)

=== Undisputed titles ===
- Undisputed lightweight champion

== See also ==
- Lineal championship
- List of lightweight boxing champions

Sporting positions
World boxing titles
Preceded by Jimmy Carter	NYSAC lightweight champion June 29, 1955 – August 24, 1956	Succeeded by Joe Brown
Preceded by Jimmy Carter	NBA lightweight champion June 29, 1955 – August 24, 1956	Succeeded by Joe Brown
Preceded by Jimmy Carter	The Ring lightweight champion June 29, 1955 – August 24, 1956	Succeeded by Joe Brown
Preceded by Jimmy Carter	Undisputed lightweight champion June 29, 1955 – August 24, 1956	Succeeded by Joe Brown
