= Ezz El-Din Nasir =

Egyptian boxer

Personal information
- Nationality: Egyptian
- Born: Cairo, Egypt
- Died: 5 April 1963

Sport
- Sport: Boxing

Ezz El-Din Nasir (died 5 April 1963) was an Egyptian boxer. He competed in the men's lightweight event at the 1948 Summer Olympics. He was killed when his Egyptian Air Force plane was shot down during the North Yemen civil war.
