= Auguste Caulet =

French boxer

Personal information
- Nationality: French
- Born: 15 October 1926; Montpellier, France
- Died: 16 April 2011 (aged 84)

Sport
- Sport: Boxing

Auguste Caulet (15 October 1926 – 16 April 2011) was a French boxer. He competed in the men's lightweight event at the 1948 Summer Olympics.
