= Svend Wad =

Danish boxer (1928–2004)

Olympic medal record

Men's Boxing
Bronze medal – third place	1948 London	Lightweight

Svend Wad (3 February 1928 in Bov near Haderslev, Denmark – 4 December 2004 in Haderslev, Denmark) was a boxer from Denmark, who competed in the Lightweight division during his career.

== Amateur career ==
Wad was the Olympic Bronze Medalist at lightweight in London in 1948. Below are his results from that tournament:

- Round of 32: defeated Gene Raymond (India) on points
- Round of 16: defeated Alberto Boullossa (Uruguay) on points
- Quarterfinal: defeated Maxie McCullagh (Ireland) on points
- Semifinal: lost to Gerald Dreyer (South Africa) on points
- Bronze Medal Bout: won by walkover versus Wallace Smith (USA).

== Pro career ==
Wad turned pro in 1949 and fought primarily in Denmark. In 1951 he fought Jorgen Johansen for the Danish lightweight title but lost a decision. Later that year he lost a decision to Duilio Loi in Switzerland, his only fight outside of Denmark. He retired for good in 1958, having won 14 and lost 2 with 0 KO.
