= Ron Cooper (boxer) =

British boxer (1928–2023)

Personal information
- Nationality: British
- Born: 5 February 1928; London, England
- Died: 15 March 2023 (aged 95)

Sport
- Sport: Boxing

Ronald Dennis Cooper (5 February 1928 – 15 March 2023) was a British boxer. He fought as Ron Cooper and competed in the men's lightweight event at the 1948 Summer Olympics.

Cooper won the 1948 Amateur Boxing Association British lightweight title, when boxing out of the Royal Navy BC.

Cooper died on 15 March 2023, at the age of 95.
