= Bangladeshi (disambiguation) =

Bangladeshi are the citizens and nationals of Bangladesh, a South Asian country centred on the transnational historical region of Bengal along the eponymous bay.

Bangladeshi or variations may also refer to:

- Bengalis
- Bangladeshi American
- Bangladeshi Australian
- British Bangladeshi
- Bangladeshi Canadian

== People associated with Bangladesh ==
- Demographics of Bangladesh
- List of Bangladeshis

=== Diaspora communities ===
- Bangladeshis in India - often referred to as Bangladeshi Indian.
- Bangladeshis in Italy - often referred to as Bangladeshi Italian.
- Bangladeshis in Japan - often referred to as Japanese Bangladeshi.
- Bangladeshis in Malaysia - often referred to as Malaysian Bangladeshi.
- Bangladeshis in Maldives - often referred to as Bangladeshi Maldivian.
- Bangladeshis in the Middle East
  - Bangladeshis in Saudi Arabia
  - Bangladeshis in the United Arab Emirates
- Bangladeshis in Pakistan - often referred to as Pakistani Bangladeshi.

== Other ==
- Languages of Bangladesh
- Bangladeshi cuisine

== See also ==
- Bangladesh (disambiguation)
- Culture of Bangladesh
