= Bangladeshi immigration to Brazil =

Bangladeshi Brazilians
Total population
- 6,000

Regions with significant populations
- Paraná (state); Brasília; São Paulo; Passo Fundo

Languages
- Bengali; Brazilian Portuguese

Religion
- Islam

Related ethnic groups
- Asian Americans; Bangladeshi diaspora; Bangladeshis

Bangladeshi immigration to Brazil is a new trend, as the South American country has no tradition of receiving the Bengali people. Most of Bangladeshi immigrants to Brazil ask for political asylum and protection from the Brazilian government. Most of the countries declare them as "refugees", although for the first time, Bangladeshis started to arrive in Brazil in the late 2000s and the migratory wave started to go upwards in the early 2010s. One of the reasons for choosing Brazil as a new home for these immigrants is their vision of the country being 'welcoming and full of opportunities', which they do not find in their home country, beyond the poverty, political and religious persecution in Bangladesh.

== Illegal immigration ==
Brazilian police found connections of trafficking Bangladeshi nationals into the country. Saifullah Al-Mamun, a Bangladeshi was arrested by Brazilian federal police who was believed to be one of the world's most notorious human traffickers. He is involved with smuggling into Brazil, and then to the United States, people from Afghanistan, Bangladesh, India, Nepal and Pakistan', the Brazilian police report.

Some immigrants have been victims of exploitation being deceived by international human trafficking, but those who work legally in the country tend to be employed in factories where halal slaughter (a type of meat preparation that follows Islamic precepts) is required.

Only between the months from January to April 2018, the Bangladeshi were the fifth group of foreigners who requested refuge in the Latin American country, only being overcome by Venezuelans, Haitians, Cubans and Chinese.

== See also ==
- Bangladesh–Brazil relations
- Bangladeshi diaspora
- Immigration to Brazil
