= Hedayet Ahmed =

His Excellency Hedayet Ahmed
- Born: Hedayet Ahmed Chowdhury; 20 March 1933; East Bhadeshwar Union, Golapganj, Sylhet, Bangladesh
- Died: 5 June 2001
- Education: University of Dhaka (BA) University of Oxford (Postgraduate diploma) Harvard University (MPA) Jahangirnagar University (MA)
- Predecessor: Lieutenant General Mir Shawkat Ali (Egypt), Mohammed Mohsin (diplomat) (Saudi Arabia)
- Successor: M Siddiqur Rahman (Egypt), Quazi Golam Dastgir (Saudi Arabia)
- Relatives: Tassduq Ahmad (brother)

Hedayet Ahmed (20 March 1933 – 5 June 2001) was a Bangladeshi civil servant, diplomat, and international official, who served as ambassador to Egypt from 7 February 1983 to 25 July 1985 before being transferred to Saudi Arabia, where he held the position from 1 August 1985 to 30 January 1988. He also served as secretary in the Ministry of Civil Aviation and Tourism and as director of UNESCO's Principal Regional Office for Asia and the Pacific. He was a secretary of the Ministry of Civil Aviation and Tourism. He was a brother of British-Bangladeshi politician Tassaduq Ahmed.

== Early life and education ==
Ahmed was born in East Bhadeswar, Golapgonj, Sylhet to Modoris Akik Chowdhury and Begum Sufia Khatun Chowdhury. He lost his mother in early childhood and was subsequently raised by his maternal uncle.

He completed his bachelor's in business studies from the University of Dhaka in 1954. He then got a diploma in Political Science and Public Administration from the University of Oxford in 1959, and a Masters Degree in Public Administration from the Harvard Kennedy School in 1970. In 1976, Ahmed obtained a second master's degree from Jahangirnagar University. He is a member of the Bangladesh Economics Association.

== Career ==
Ahmed was a deputy secretary in the civil service of Pakistan in 1971 at the time of the Bangladesh Liberation War.

On 7 February 1983, Ahmed was appointed as the Ambassador of Bangladesh to Egypt, replacing Lieutenant General Mir Shawkat Ali. Ali was then appointed ambassador of Bangladesh to Germany. On 6 August 1985, M Siddiqur Rahman replaced him as the Ambassador of Bangladesh to Egypt.

Ahmed was appointed ambassador of Bangladesh to Saudi Arabia on 1 August 1985, replacing Mohammed Mohsin. Quazi Golam Dastgir succeeded him as the ambassador on 2 February 1988. During his time as ambassador in Saudi Arabia, he founded Bangladesh International School, Dammam that opened on 1 February 1987.

Ahmed was also president of the University of Asia Pacific. He had worked for UNESCO in Bangkok.
