= Bangladeshi diaspora =

People of Bangladeshi origin living outside Bangladesh

প্রবাসী বাংলাদেশী
- Flag of Bangladesh

Total population
- 8.7 million + (2024); ~15 Million (2026 est.)

Regions with significant populations
- Pakistan: 3,000,000-4,000,000 (2023)
- India: 3,100,000–3,700,000 (2001 census) (Note: based on the 2001 census of India.)
- Saudi Arabia: 3,500,000 (2025 estimate)
- UAE: 1,200,000 (2013)
- United Kingdom: 700,000 ~ 1,000,000
- Oman: 680,242 (2018)
- Malaysia: 800,000 ~ 1,000,000 (2023)
- Qatar: 400,000 (2019)
- Kuwait: 350,000 (2020)
- South Africa: 300,000 (2019)
- United States: 600,000 (2024)
- Italy: 213.622 (2025)
- Singapore: 150,000 (2020)
- Lebanon: 100,000 (2024)
- Canada: 120,000
- Maldives: 80,000
- Greece: 35,000 ~ 50,000 (2025)
- Spain: 50,000 ~ 80,000
- Australia: 70,000 ~ 85,000 (2024)
- Brunei: 30,000
- Portugal: 50,000
- Mauritius: 25,000 (2021)
- Japan: 40,000 (2026)
- South Korea: 22,000 (2020)
- Libya: 20,000 (2019)
- Germany: 20,000 (2020)
- Brazil: 7,388 (2025)
- Norway: 5,000 (2025)

Religion
- Majority: Islam; Minority: Hinduism, Christianity, Buddhism
- Note: Populations under 20,000 are intentionally omitted.

The Bangladeshi diaspora (Bengali: প্রবাসী বাংলাদেশী) are people of Bangladeshi birth, descent or origin who live outside of Bangladesh. According to the United Nations International Organization for Migration there are almost 8.7 million Bangladeshis living abroad, the sixth highest country of origin for international migrants in the world. Annual remittances transferred to Bangladesh were almost $30.04 billion in 2024, third highest in South Asia.

The largest Bangladeshi diaspora population is in Pakistan. There are also significant migrant communities across various Arab states of the Persian Gulf, particularly in Saudi Arabia, The United Arab Emirates and Oman, where Bangladeshis are primarily employed as foreign workers. The United Kingdom is home to the largest Bangladeshi community in Europe. British Bangladeshis are mainly concentrated in London boroughs such as (Tower Hamlets and Newham); the migration to Britain is mainly attributed with chain migration from the Sylhet Division. In addition to the UK and the Middle East, Bangladeshis also have a significant presence in the United States. Other countries where there are significant Bangladeshi communities include Malaysia, South Africa, Singapore, Italy, Canada, and Australia. The majority of the Bangladeshi diaspora are Muslim, with a significant Hindu minority.

Bangladeshi diaspora movements and settlements abroad have divergent histories and challenges, with the diaspora in the Gulf Cooperation Council states focused on ensuring continuous labor migration flows and reducing labor-related abuses, while in the US and UK, a major challenge is the growing intergenerational divides.

== South Asia ==
=== Maldives ===
According to the Maldivian foreign ministry; some 50,000 Bangladeshi were working in there in 2011, a nation of only around 400,000 people, with a third having no valid documents or registration.

== Middle East ==
Bangladeshis in the Middle East form the largest part of the worldwide Bangladeshi diaspora. Between 2.3 million and 2.9 million live within the Middle East.

More than two million are in Saudi Arabia. The United Arab Emirates is home to 706,000. Oman has about 680,242 Bangladeshis as of 2018. There is a Bangladeshi school in the city of Muscat, in Oman, called Bangladesh School Muscat. Qatar has about 400,000 Bangladeshis as of 2019. Bangladeshis in Qatar make more than 12.5% of the Qatar population. Kuwait has about 350,000 Bangladeshis as of 2020. Bahrain has about 180,000 Bangladeshis as of 2017.

=== Saudi Arabia ===
The introduction of Islam to the Bengali people has generated a connection to the Arabian Peninsula, as Muslims are required to visit the land once in their lifetime to complete the Hajj pilgrimage. Several Bengali sultans funded Islamic institutions in the Hejaz, which popularly became known by the Arabs as Bangali Madaris. It is unknown when Bengalis began settling in Arab lands though an early example is that of Haji Shariatullah's teacher Mawlana Murad, who was permanently residing in the city of Mecca in the early 1800s. There are about three major Bangladeshi schools in Saudi Arabia in Riyadh, Jeddah and Dammam.

=== United Arab Emirates ===
There are 706,000 Bangladeshis residing in the United Arab Emirates as of 2020. There is one Bangladeshi school in UAE called Shaikh Khalifa Bin Zayed Bangladesh Islamia School in Abu Dhabi. Bangladeshis make up around 7% of the UAE population and are 3rd largest community in the UAE.

== East and Southeast Asia ==
=== Malaysia ===
The Bangladeshi population in Malaysia is 400,000 as of 2023.

=== South Korea ===
In South Korea, there are more than 12,678 Bangladeshi foreign workers in the country as of 2013. A few of them include illegal immigrants. The 2009 Korean film Bandhobi, directed by Sin Dong-il, depicts a Bangladeshi migrant in South Korea.

As of 2023, the population had increased to 25,000. 3500 of them are students.

=== Japan ===
Bangladeshis in Japan (在日バングラデシュ人, Zainichi Banguradeshujin) form one of the smaller populations of foreigners in Japan. As of 2010, Japan's Ministry of Justice recorded 10,175 Bangladeshi nationals among the total population of registered foreigners in Japan.

== Western world ==
=== United States ===
The census in 2000 found up to 95,300 were born in Bangladesh. It was until the 1990s when Bangladeshis, many from Dhaka, Chittagong, and Sylhet, started to move to the United States, and settled in urban areas such as New York, Paterson in New Jersey, Philadelphia, Atlantic City, New Jersey, Washington D.C., and Los Angeles. Although recent findings claim that Bangladeshis started arriving during the late 19th centuries from the southern part of current Bangladesh. In some parts of Queens and Manhattan in New York City, there are Bangladeshi restaurant owners of Indian restaurants, Pakistani restaurants, and Bangladeshi restaurants. The Baishakhi Mela celebration of the Bengali New Year is also held by the Bangladeshi American communities in New York, Paterson, Philadelphia, Washington, D.C., Atlantic City and other cities annually. The street of 3rd Street, Los Angeles has a large history of Bangladeshis and has officially been dubbed as "Little Bangladesh". In "Little Bangladesh", Bengali Muslims arrange Chaand Raat celebrations by performing classic, lively Bengali folk songs with the crowds singing along and selling Fuskas (a Bangladeshi street snack of fried semolina dough filled with spicy chickpeas, potatoes and toppings). However, some Bangladeshis residing in New York have settled in newer areas, such as Hamtramck, Michigan, Buffalo, New York, Paterson, New Jersey, and many other nearby states due to lower living costs and better job opportunities. Many Bangladeshis in New York City are often Taxi Drivers, Fast-Food Chain Workers, Restaurant Workers, software developer, computer scientists, medical doctors, attorneys, accountants, business owners, company CEO etc. In Atlantic City many work in casinos.

According to the U.S. Census Bureau's 2018 American Community Survey, there were 213,372 people of Bangladeshi origin living in the US.

=== Canada ===
Bangladeshi Canadian refers to a person of Bangladeshi background born in Canada or a Bangladeshi that has migrated to Canada. Before 1971 about 150 Bengali people came to Canada as East Pakistani. The main influx of migration of Bangladeshis started in the early 1980s. Back in 1988, about 700 Bangladeshi families lived in Toronto, though about another 900 families were living in Montreal. Now, Toronto has a sizeable Bangladeshi community significantly larger than Montreal's, with over 50,000 in the city proper and over 65,000 in the Greater Toronto Area. Toronto's eastern boroughs of East York and Scarborough on Danforth Avenue have a sizable Bangladeshi population. The area around Danforth east and west of Victoria Park Avenue has many Bangladeshi stores and restaurants. The Crescent Town neighbourhood just north of Danforth, which consists of many high-rise apartment buildings, has primarily a Bengali population. In 2019, a petition was started to rename Danforth Avenue, or at least a part of it, to Bangladesh Avenue. This request was made to honour the large Bangladeshi community that was established there. In July 2023, the City of Toronto officially designated Danforth Avenue, between Pharmacy Avenue and Main Street as "Banglatown". Under the Investor Category, about 100 families moved to Canada since 2015.

Bangladeshi Canadians have participated in local civic organizations, including Doly Begum who, in 2018, was the first person of Bangladeshi descent to be elected to any legislative body in the North American.

=== Australia ===
Bangladeshis in Australia are one of the smallest immigrant communities living in Australia. There are around 41,000 Bangladeshis in Australia. The largest Bangladeshi communities are mainly present in the states of New South Wales and Victoria, with large concentrations in the cities of Sydney and Melbourne.

=== Norway ===
The Bangladeshi immigrant population in Norway has gradually increased over the past two decades, with an estimated 5,000 individuals living primarily in major cities such as Oslo, Bergen, Trondheim, and Stavanger. The Bangladeshi immigrant population in Norway has gradually increased over the past two decades, with an estimated 5,000 individuals living primarily in major cities such as Oslo, Bergen, Trondheim, and Stavanger. While the Bangladeshi community in Norway is smaller compared to those in countries like the United Kingdom or Italy, it consists largely of international students, skilled professionals in fields such as IT, healthcare, and telecommunications, as well as their family members. Many are also employed in sectors like hospitality, transportation, and retail.

=== Brazil ===
Bangladeshis started arriving in Brazil in the 1980s. There are around 2,000 people of Bangladeshi origin in Brazil with most of them living in São Paulo as of 2021. Bangladeshi nationals, who live in Brazil, mainly depend on fabrics, clothing and garment trade. But many are service holders and some work in poultry farms, grocery shops and restaurants.

=== United Kingdom ===
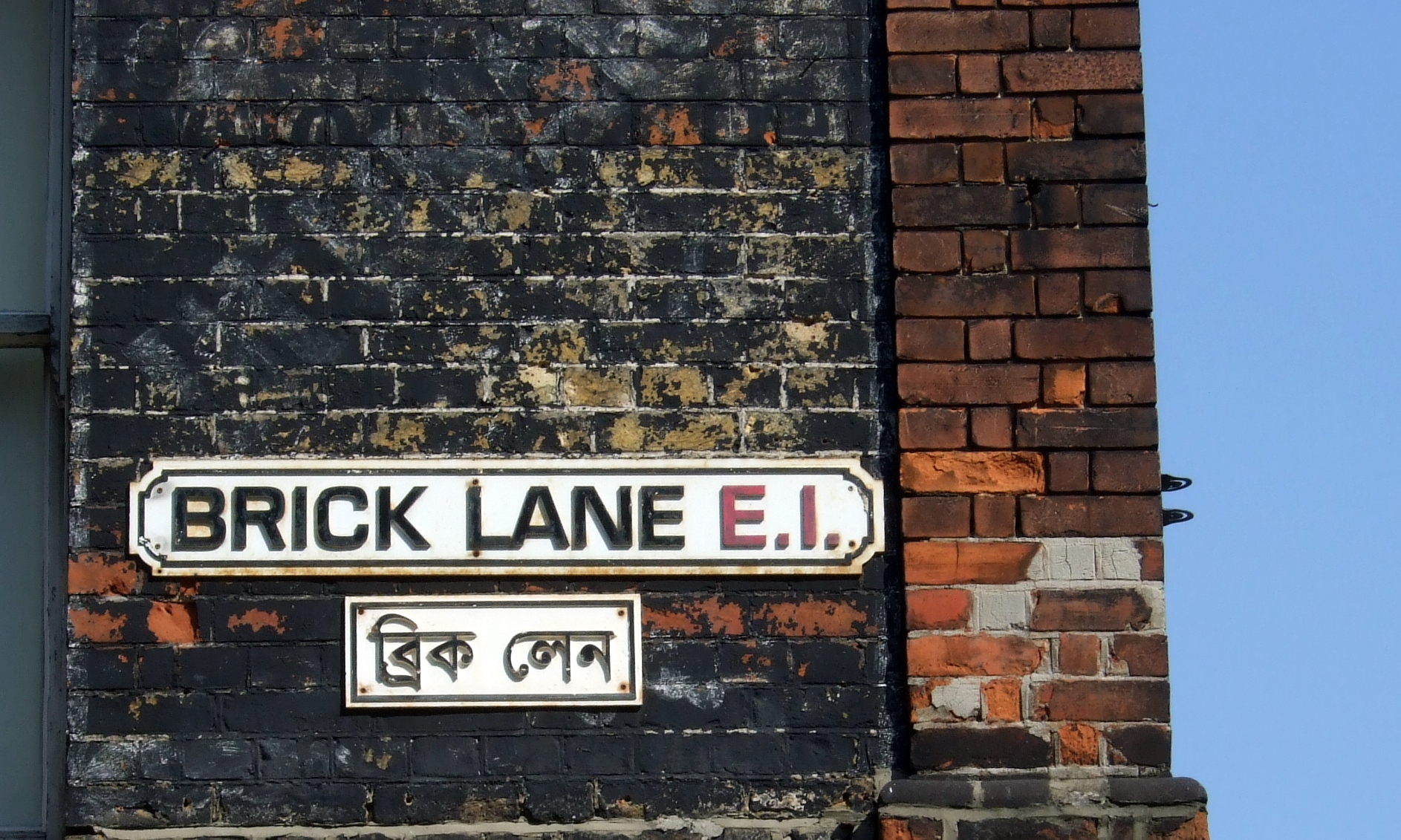
Brick Lane has become the centre of London's Banglatown

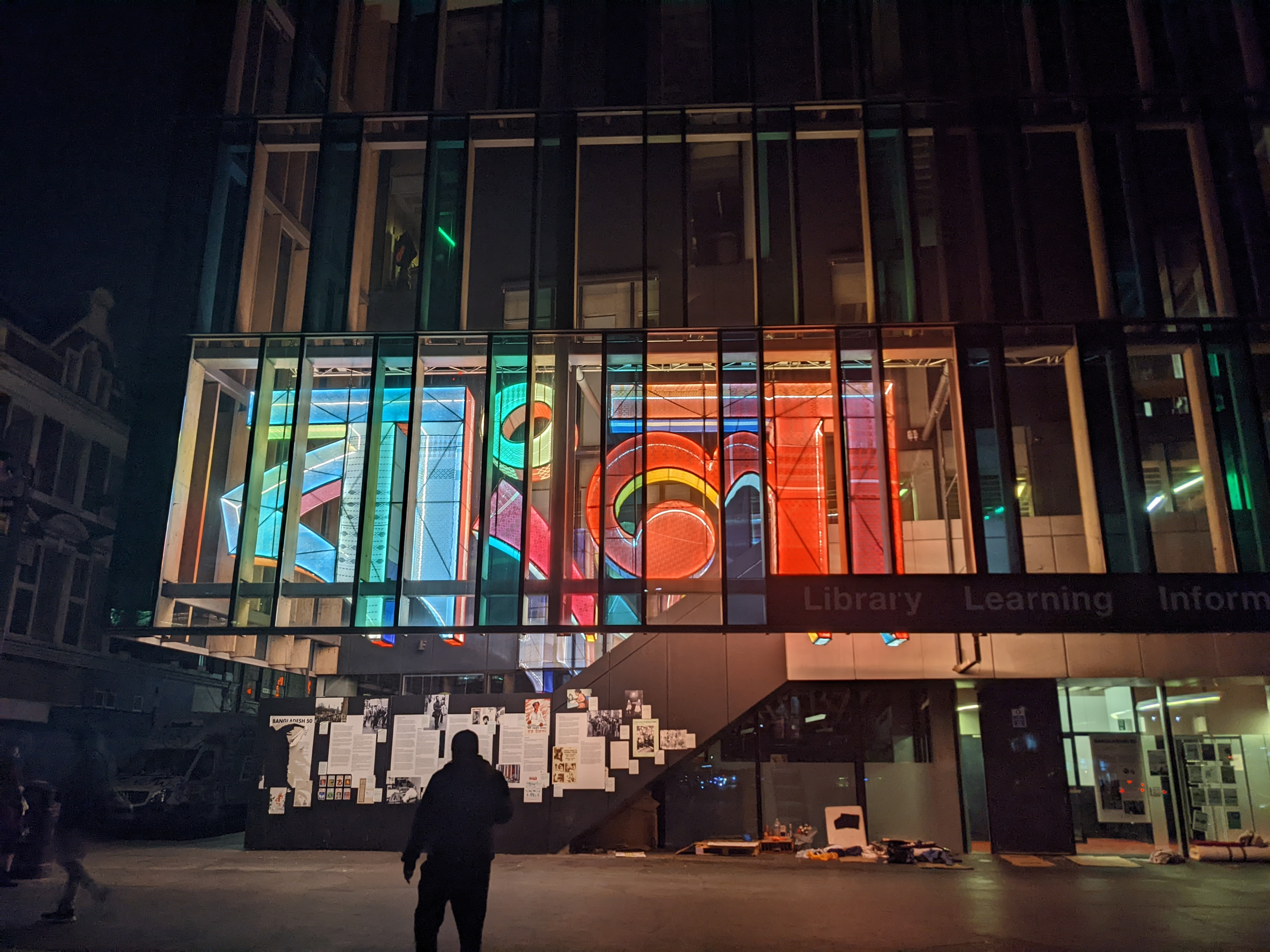
Whitechapel library illuminated with the word Bangla

Earliest records of Bengalis in the European continent date back to the reign of King George III of England during the 18th century. One such example is of James Achilles Kirkpatrick's hookah-bardar (hookah servant/preparer) who was said to have robbed and cheated Kirkpatrick, making his way to England and stylising himself as the Prince of Sylhet. The man was waited upon by the prime minister of Great Britain William Pitt the Younger, and then dined with the Duke of York before presenting himself in front of the King. Mass migration started since the days of the British Raj, where lascars from Sylhet were often sent to the United Kingdom. Some of these lascars lived in the United Kingdom in port cities, and even married British women. Since then, mass migration has occurred, specifically from Sylhet. Today, the British Bangladeshis are a naturalised community in the United Kingdom, running 90% of all South Asian cuisine restaurants and having established numerous ethnic enclaves across the country – most prominent of which is Banglatown in East London.

The street of Brick Lane in East London, has a large history of Bangladeshis and has officially been dubbed as "Banglatown", and has hundreds of "Indian" restaurants nearly all owned by Sylheti Bangladeshis. Many British Bangladeshis have made their presence in the UK, often becoming doctors, engineers, and lawyers, but also many have become politicians for the Labour party, such as Rushanara Ali, and Tulip Siddiq, as well as London Borough Mayors, such as Lutfur Rahman and Nasim Ali.

=== Italy ===
Bangladeshis are one of the largest immigrant populations in Italy. As of 2025, there were 213.622 Bangladeshis in Italy. Most of the Bangladeshis in Italy are based in Lazio, Lombardy and Veneto and the largest community in Rome with 39.078 Bangladeshis.

== See also ==
- Bengali people
- Bengali language
- Little Bangladesh
- Culture of Bangladesh
- Deshi
