= Bangladesh International School, Dammam =

- বাংলাদেশ আন্তর্জাতিক বিদ্যালয়, দাম্মাম; المدرسة العالمية البنجلاديشية، الدمام

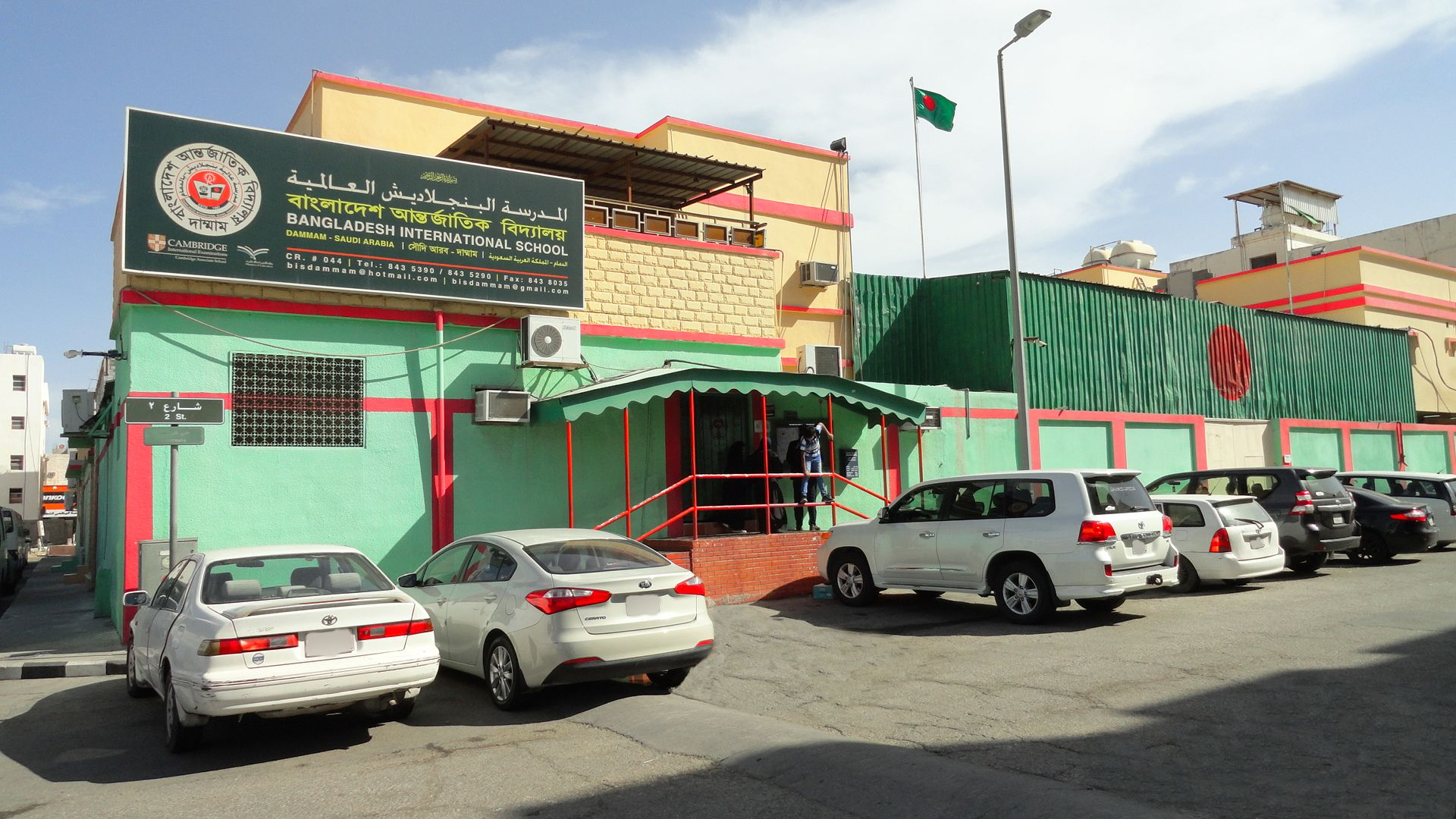
- Front office and boys' gate of BISD facing 2 St

Location
- 6376 Muath Bin Muslim St, Granada District, Dammam 32243 (Short address: EDJA6376); Dammam, Eastern Province; Saudi Arabia

Information
- Type: International
- Motto: Enter to learn, leave to lead
- Established: 1 February 1987; 39 years ago
- Founder: H. E. Hedayet Ahmed
- Status: Operating
- School board: List below
- Principal: G. M. Nizam Uddin
- Teaching staff: 80+
- Gender: Coeducational (kindergarten) Gender segregated (1st to 12th grade)
- Age: 4 to 18
- Language: English
- Schedule: July to June
- Hours in school day: 6 hours
- Colors: White and navy blue
- Web Portal: onlinecampus.bisdammam.com
- Website: bisdsa.com
- Last updated: 20 October 2024

Bangladesh International School, Dammam is a CAIE embassy school in Dammam, Eastern Province, Saudi Arabia.

== Establishment ==
The school was established on 1 February 1987 by H. E. Hedayet Ahmed, the ambassador of Bangladesh to Saudi Arabia at the time, who proposed the school as part of the education and cultural wing of the Bangladesh Embassy in Saudi Arabia. The school has since remained central to expatriate education in the region. The school has nearly 1,400 students from Bangladesh, India, Sri Lanka, Egypt, Eritrea, Ethiopia, Pakistan, Sudan, Nigeria, Yemen and Morocco among other countries. The school is run by a management committee elected by the students' parents.

The school has two sections:

- school: kindergarten to 10th grade
- college: 11th grade to 12th grade

== Neighborhood ==
The school is uniquely located in a quiet residential neighborhood, in a repurposed mid-century institutional residence facing a municipal park and mosque. This setting has made the school central among local expatriates and helped build a strong "school area" community over decades. The city's central Eid mosque is also on the other side of the street a few minutes west of the school, drawing in families who live outside the immediate neighborhood and further expanding the school's community.

== Curriculum ==
BISD follows the University of Cambridge Local Examination Syndicate for its course structure. Students sit for the IGCSE examination as they graduate the 10th grade, and their AS & A-level examination over two years as they complete the 11th and 12th grade. Both examinations take place under the supervision of the British Council in the Eastern Province. The school has teachers who come from countries including Bangladesh, India, Pakistan, Sri Lanka, and Nigeria. While the main language of instruction is English, Bengali and Arabic are also taught as mandatory subjects until the 8th grade.

== Online campus ==
The new website

The school executives launched a web portal to help the students get lecture notes, worksheets, and other necessary academic materials. It is also possible to see the examination marks and the report cards of the students. The system is managed by the system's admin, Mr. Imran Shahid. The web portal was published along with a new website in 2016.

== Hosting of Cambridge International Examinations ==
BISD has been hosting IGCSE and AS/A Level Cambridge International Examinations and has been a Cambridge Affiliate school since 2015. It is an official IELTS test and training center and also hosts Cambridge primary and upper secondary checkpoint exams.

Since March 2024, the school is also an approved Pearson Edexcel examinations center, hosting IGCSE, A Levels, iPrimary and iLower Secondary exams.

== Achievements ==
=== Inter-school achievements ===
In 2016, BISD participated in the Inter-school Speech Competition along with Inspire International Academy, Manarat Al Dammam National Schools, and other Dammam-based schools. BISD came in second place, secured by a Grade IX pupil.

=== IGCSE exams ===
At the 2006 British Council annual awards ceremony, Muhammad Ehsanul Hoque received awards for first place in A-Level mathematics and economics, while Akil Muhammad Habibullah ranked first in O-Level chemistry. During the May 2007 graduation ceremony, it was noted that the student body achieved a 100 percent passing rate in their final examinations for the 2006 academic year.

At the graduation ceremony in May 2007, Arab News announced that in 2006 the school had a 100 percent success rate for students in their final examinations.

In 2011, student Fahim Abdullah received three Cambridge awards for scoring highest globally in IGCSE Additional Mathematics and Mathematics, as well as highest in Dammam for IGCSE Physics. That same year, Maleeha Choudhury received awards for the highest combined score across four Cambridge A-Levels and the highest score in Saudi Arabia for A-Level Chemistry

Maleeha Choudhury, who had been a pupil since 1998, also achieved Best Across Four Cambridge A Levels and Top in Saudi Arabia in Chemistry. She is currently a student of medicine at Batterjee Medical College in Jeddah.

In 2018, Abdullah bin Joynal achieved the highest global score in IGCSE General Mathematics and was subsequently awarded an academic scholarship by the institution.

== Notable alumni ==
- Elita Karim, singer, journalist, performer, anchor and voice artist.

== See also ==
- Bangladeshis in Saudi Arabia
- List of schools in Saudi Arabia
