= Desi =

Endonym for the Indian subcontinent and diaspora

A map of the Indian subcontinent, depicting the republics of Bangladesh, India, and Pakistan from which Desis originate

Desi (Note: Pronounced /ˈdeɪsi, ˈdɛsi/ DAY-see, DESS-ee) (Hindustani: देसी, دیسی), (Note: written in Devanagari and Nastaliq, respectively; pronounced [d̪eːsiː]) also Deshi (Note: The tadbhava-form of the word is "desi", and the corresponding tatsama-form is "deshi".) (Bengali: দেশী), is a term used to describe the peoples, cultures, and products of the Indian subcontinent and their diaspora, derived from Sanskrit देश (dēśá), meaning 'land' or 'country'. Desi traces its origin to the people of India, Pakistan, and Bangladesh, and reflects a shared cultural and historical identity that predates the Partition of India in August 1947. (Note: The modern-day independent countries of Bangladesh, India, and Pakistan were included within the boundaries of colonial India prior to the Partition of India in August 1947.)

The term is occasionally extended to include Bhutan, Maldives, Nepal, and Sri Lanka.

== Etymology and history ==
The ethnonym belongs in the endonymic category (i.e., it is a self-appellation). Desi (देसी/دیسی desī) is a Hindustani (Hindi-Urdu) word, meaning 'national', ultimately from Sanskrit dēśīya, derived from dēśá (देश) 'region, province, country'. The first known usage of the Sanskrit word is found in the Natya Shastra (~200 BCE), where it defines the regional varieties of folk performing arts, as opposed to the classical, pan-Indian margi. Thus, svadēśa (Sanskrit: स्वदेश) refers to one's own country or homeland, while paradēśa (Sanskrit: परदेश) refers to another's country or a foreign land.

The word "Desi" is used to refer to something "from the country" and with time its usage shifted towards referring to people, cultures, and products of a specific region; for example, desi food, desi calendars, and desi dress.

Desi contrasts with the Bengali and Hindustani language word wilāyati (Anglicised as "Blighty") meaning 'foreign', which more specifically came to mean 'European', and 'British'/'English' during the time of the British Raj in colonial India. The word is a loan of Indian Persian wilāyatī (ولایاتی), from wilāyat (ولایت) usually to mean 'Iran' and later 'Europe' or 'Britain'/'England', ultimately from Arabic wilāyah ولاية meaning 'state, province'.

After the passage of the Immigration and Nationality Act of 1965, the United States dramatically increased immigration from the subcontinent. As increasing numbers of students from the subcontinent arrived in the US and UK (and other Anglophonic countries such as Australia, Canada, New Zealand, etc.), their countries of origin were colloquially referred to as dēś. For example, all things Indian including Indian expatriates were referred to as "desi".

== Usage ==
The word Desi is widely used by South Asians, as well as those of the South Asian diaspora, to describe themselves; those of South Asian origin, especially Indians, Pakistanis and Bangladeshis, use the term "as a means of asserting or reclaiming a sense of pride" in being South Asian, "particularly in the face of racism, discrimination, and stigmatization" of minorities in various parts of the world. With regard to usage of the word Desi, Helen Kim writes:

Desiness imagines a more cohesive, pan-South Asian American community that goes beyond nation, class, and religion. Instead, a 'desi' South Asian American community comes together over its shared experiences of being positioned as non-White 'others', often cutting across differences in caste, class, religion, and gender. In the UK, the term 'desi' is commonly used to describe British [South] Asian forms of cultural production such as music, literature, and television programming. For example, shows such as Desi DNA, featured on the BBC and BBC Asian Network, cover all areas of current British [South] Asian popular culture such as film, music, and the visual arts, including fashion and style. Club nights that feature [South] Asian music such as bhangra and [South Asian] hip hop, as previously mentioned, are often billed as 'desi' nights. The Internet radio station DesiHits.com, rivaling the BBC Asian Network in cultural significance as well as in the number of young [South] Asian listeners, plays all the current [South] Asian hits, which allows one to browse online by artist and by genre, listing them under categories such as 'desi beats', 'Bollywood', and 'hip hop'.

Among teenagers who have ancestral roots in the Indian subcontinent, the term Desi is "embraced to elucidate a new inclusive identity of South Asians in the US, who participate as 'public consumers and producers of a distinctive, widely circulating cultural and linguistic forms'." To this end, channels such as MTV Desi have recognized "the transnational nature of Desi youth culture, writers, producers, and VJs" and have shared "a range of topics relating to life in South Asia and the South Asian diaspora worldwide".

"Desi" is sometimes perceived as offensive among some South Asian expatriates, as they claim that it erases the diversity of cultural identities within the South Asian community, and that it primarily identifies the dominant North Indian community while excluding other South Asian groups. Some resist the label, citing historical Indian imperialism and cultural hegemony. They believe that terms like "Desi" impose a homogenous identity and fail to acknowledge the pluralistic nature of South Asian communities. Alternatives like "South Asian" or "Brown" have been proposed, but they also have their limitations and can be perceived as misleading or exclusive. While some individuals find the term "South Asian" inclusive and encompassing, others feel it does not fully capture their specific backgrounds. The complexity and diversity of the diaspora necessitate recognizing multiple identities and resisting the tendency to homogenize or erase particular communities.

Among non-diasporic South Asians, the term Desi is sometimes used to indicate that a person is rural, unexposed to foreign/modern culture, and more deeply steeped in native South Asian culture.

== Culture ==
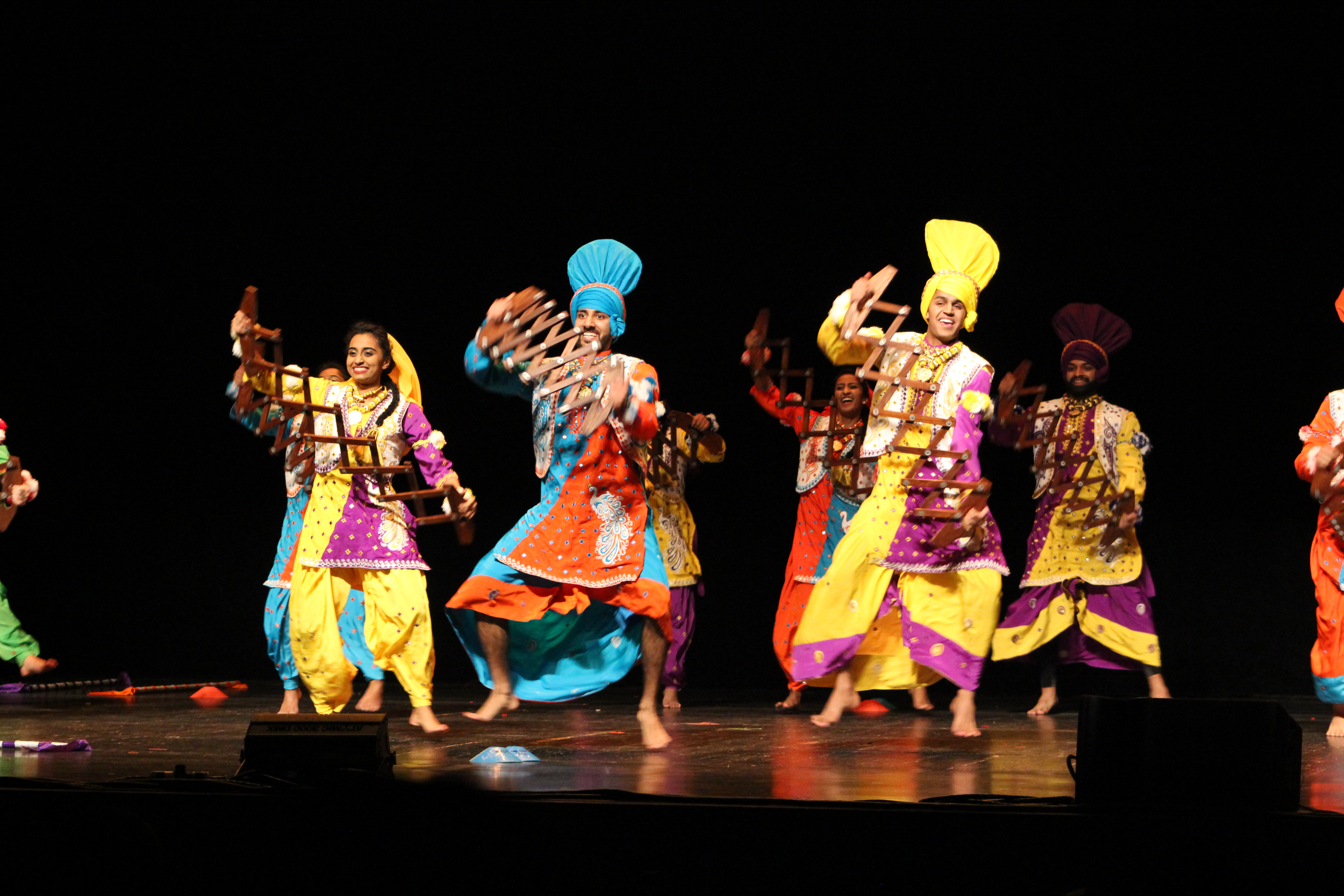
South Asian university students celebrate Desi culture through dance at the Ohio State University.

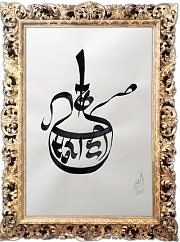
"Surahi" written in Samrup Rachna calligraphy used to write Hindustani, which is widely spoken throughout the northern part of the Indian subcontinent as a lingua franca.

Frank Anthony, an Anglo-Indian Christian leader who helped write the Constitution of India stated that unlike Europe, “[colonial] India had achieved a basic ethnic and cultural unity.” (The boundaries of colonial India include the modern-day republics of independent India, as well as what is now Pakistan and Bangladesh.)

In the United States, as in other countries, some diaspora desis are creating a "fusion" culture, in which foods, fashions, music, and the like from many areas of South Asia are "fused" both with each other and with elements from Western culture. For example, Urban Desi is a genre of music formed by the fusion of traditional South Asian music and Western urban music. The growing demand of popular programming for South Asians caused MTV to launch the desi-targeted television channel MTV Desi.

In the United Kingdom, desi communities have continued the fusion culture which first emerged during the 89 year rule of the British Raj in colonial India, influencing British music, art, fashion and food. There are now dedicated radio stations catering to British-South Asians such as the BBC Asian Network.

In Canada, desis have established sizable ethnic enclaves in areas such as Brampton, Ontario (suburban Toronto) and Surrey, British Columbia (suburban Vancouver).

=== Performing arts ===
The Natya Shastra refers to the regional varieties of folk dance and music elements as desi, and states that these are meant as pure entertainment for common people, while the pan-Indian margi elements are to spiritually enlighten the audience. The medieval developments of the classical Indian dance and music led to the introduction of desi gharanas, in addition to the classical gharanas codified in Natya Shastra. The desi gharanas further developed into the present-day adavus. There is raga in Indian classical music known as "Desi".

=== Food and drink ===
In regions of South Asia, desi in the context of food, implies "native" or "traditional". For example, "Desi chicken" may refer to a native breed of chicken. This word is also usually restricted to Sanskrit-derived (Indo-Aryan) languages.

Heritage varieties of vegetables and other produce can also be qualified as "desi". "Desi diet" refers to a diet and food choices followed by Indians around the world. Desi daru refers to "country liquor", such as fenny, toddy and arrack. It is differentiated from Indian-made foreign liquor such as Indian-made whisky, rum, or vodka.

=== Desi pubs ===
In the United Kingdom, the term Desi pub is used to describe a pub which is owned or managed by an Indian landlord, or which serves Punjabi food. They developed during the 1960s and 1970s at a time when some British pubs enforced color bars to prevent Indians and other immigrants from drinking there. Desi pubs are especially common in the Black Country and surrounding areas of the West Midlands. As well as drinking places, they also act as community hubs and meeting places for people from different backgrounds and are considered to be an example of successful integration of Indian immigrants into British culture.

== See also ==
- American-born confused desi
- Ganga-Jamuni tehzeeb
- Greater India
- Little Bangladesh
- Little India
- Little Pakistan
- South Asian Heritage Month
- Pravasi Bharatiya Divas
- Indian Arrival Day
- Pinoy, an analogous term for Filipinos
- Habesha, an analogous term for Ethiopians and Eritreans
