= Bangladeshis in the Middle East =

People of Bangladeshi birth or origin who reside in the Middle East

Bangladeshis in the Middle East (Bengali: মধ্যপ্রাচ্যে বাংলাদেশি, romanized: Madhyaprācyē Bānlādēśi; Arabic: البنغلاديشيون في الشرق الأوسط, romanized: al-Banġlādīšīyūna fī al-Šarq al-ʾĀūsaṭ; Persian: بنگلادشی‌ها در خاورمیانه, romanized: Banglâdeshi-hâ dar Khâvar-e Miane; Turkish: Ortadoğu'daki Bangladeşliler), form the largest part of the worldwide Bangladeshi diaspora. Although Bangladesh only came into existence in 1971, the land of East Bengal which is today Bangladesh has strong ties to the Middle East. Out of the 13 Million Bangladeshis abroad approximately 8 million live within the Middle East, with 2.5 million in Saudi Arabia and a 1 million of them in the United Arab Emirates. Bangladeshis who come to the Middle East are primarily guest workers or day labourers. Bangladesh is one of the largest labour suppliers to Saudi Arabia. In 2007, Bangladeshi workers obtained the biggest share, with 23.50 per cent of the 1.5 million Saudi Arabia visas issued.

Flag of Bangladesh

== History ==
The introduction of Islam to the people of Bengal region in the Indian subcontinent has generated a connection to the Arabian Peninsula, as Muslims are required to visit the land once in their lifetime to complete the Hajj pilgrimage. Several Bengali sultans funded Islamic institutions in the Hejaz, which popularly became known by the Arabs as Bangali Madaris. It is unknown when Bengalis began settling in Arab lands though an early example is that of Haji Shariatullah's teacher Mawlana Murad, who was permanently residing in the city of Mecca in the early 1800s.

== Communities by country ==
=== Bangladeshis in Saudi Arabia ===
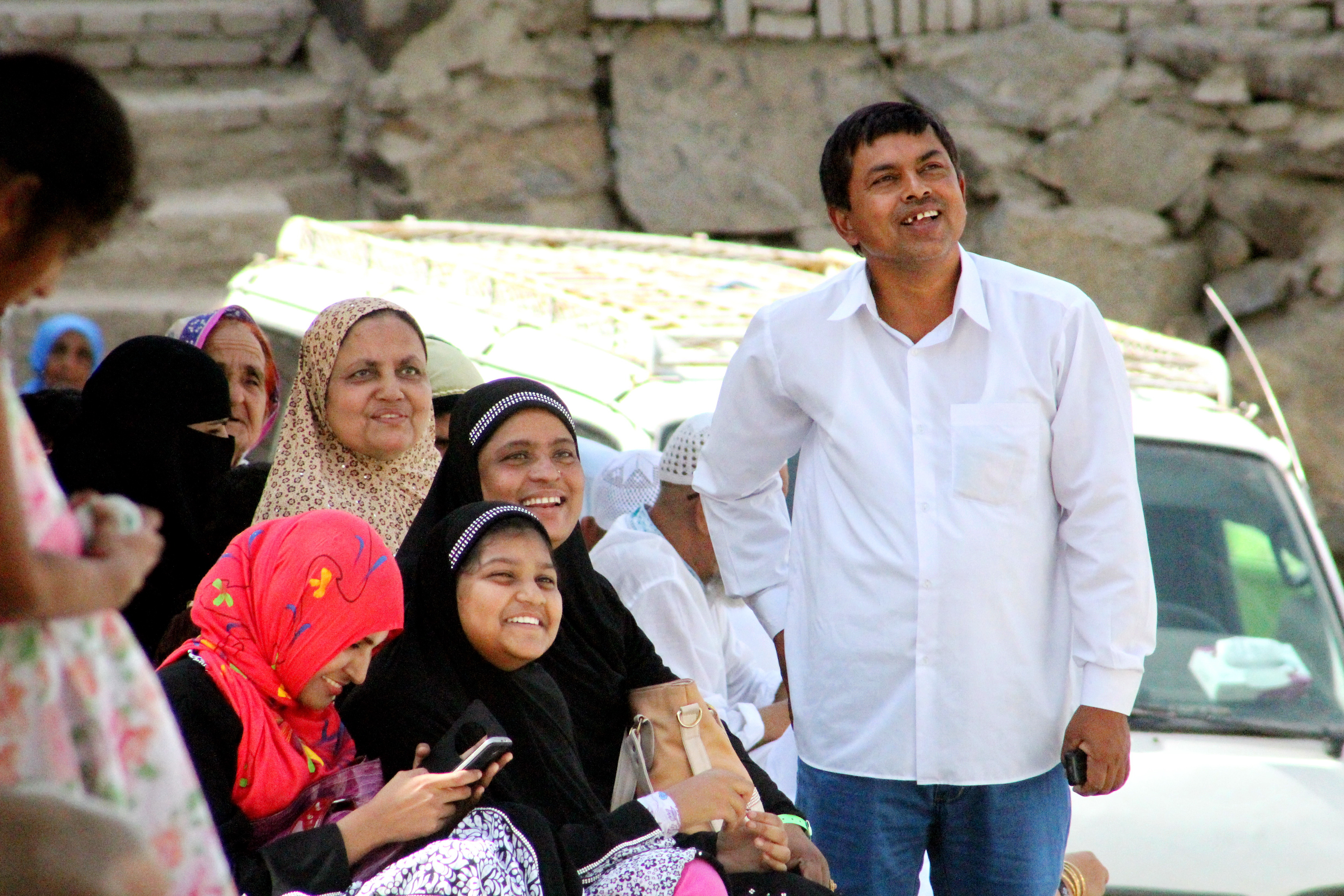
A Bangladeshi family at Jabal al-Nour in the Mecca area

Saudi Arabia is the largest Middle Eastern destination for Bangladeshi migrant workers. Around 3.5 million Bangladeshis live and work in Saudi Arabia. Bangladeshi migrants in Saudi Arabia are concentrated in low-skilled labor, including construction, domestic work, maintenance, driving, and service-sector employment. Saudi Arabia remains one of the most important sources of remittances for Bangladesh, but it has also been associated with concerns over unpaid wages, abuse, and deportations affecting Bangladeshi workers.

=== Bangladeshis in the UAE ===
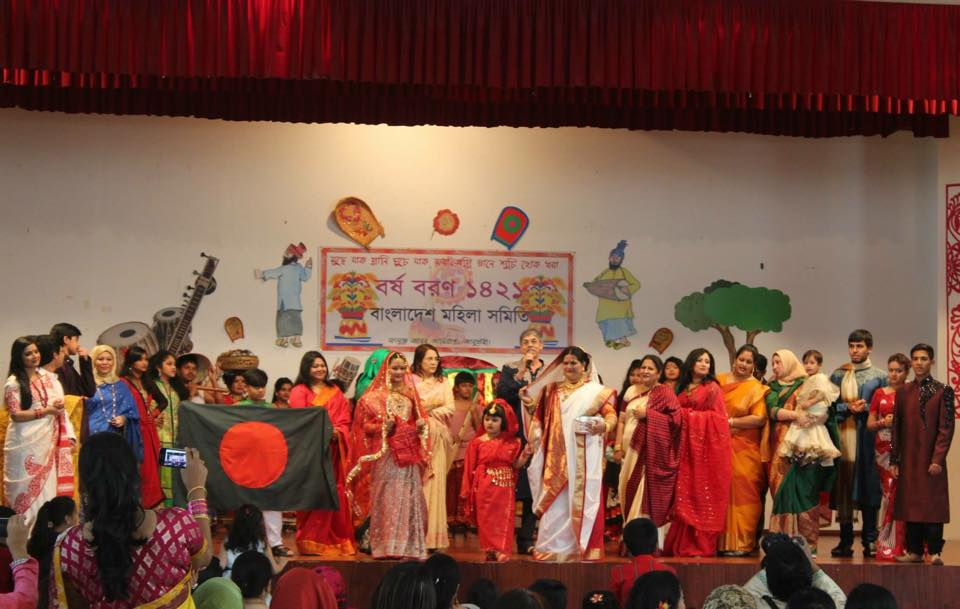
Pohela Boishakh celebration by the Women's Association in Abu Dhabi, United Arab Emirates, 2014

The UAE is one of the major destinations for Bangladeshi migrants. The UAE is home to around 1.2 million Bangladeshi migrants and Bangladeshis are the third largest expatriate community in the country after Indians and Pakistanis. Bangladeshi workers in the UAE are present across construction, hospitality, transport, retail and domestic work, alongside a smaller number of professionals and business owners. The size and composition of the community make it one of the most prominent Bangladeshi expatriate populations in the Middle East.

=== Bangladeshis in Qatar ===
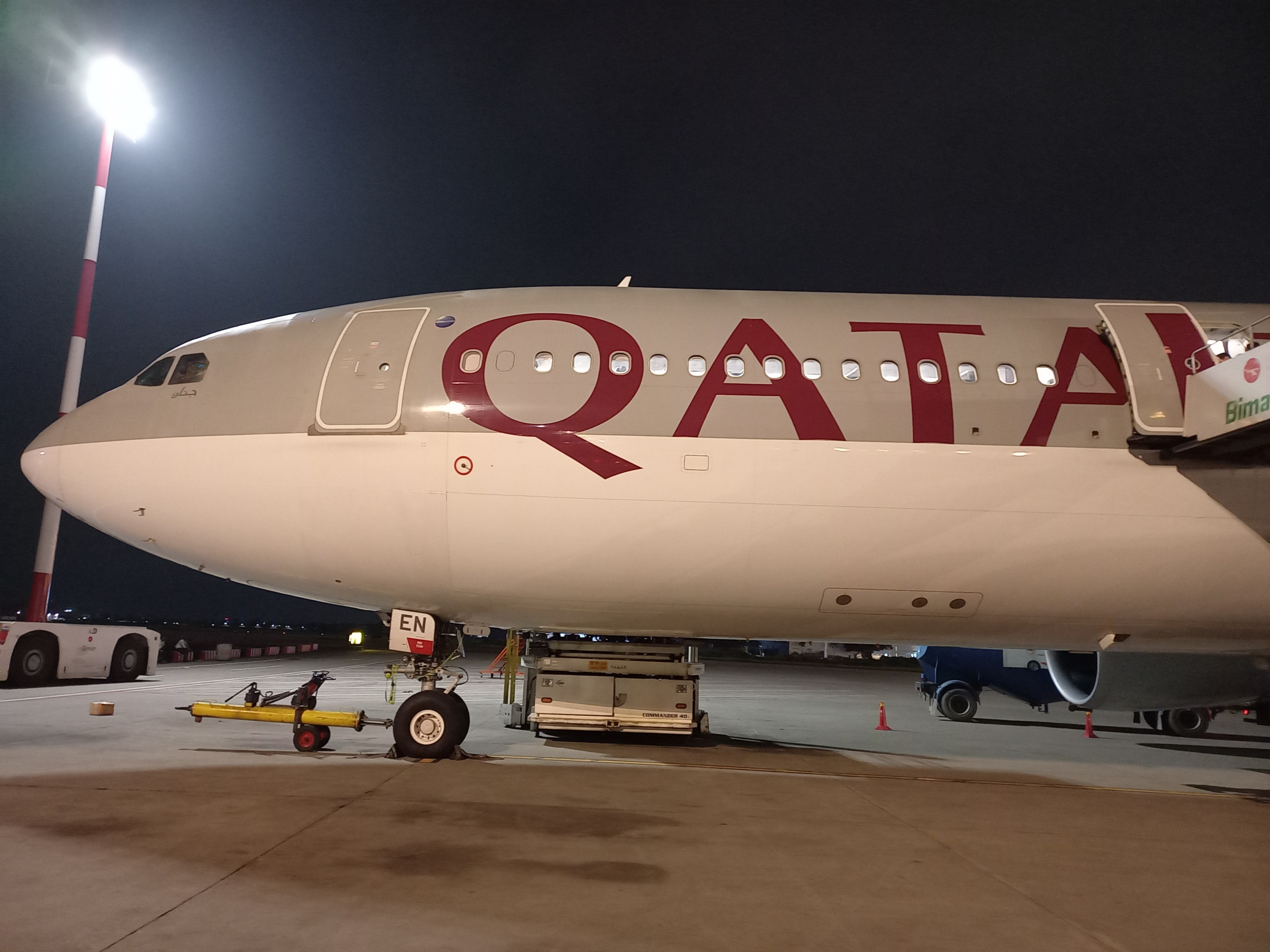
A Qatar Airways aircraft landing in Bangladesh from Qatar

Bangladeshis in Qatar form one of the country's larger expatriate communities, numbering around half a million people. Many Bangladeshi workers in Qatar are employed in construction and other labor-intensive sectors, including cleaning, transport and service work. During the build-up to the 2022 FIFA World Cup, labor conditions affecting Bangladeshi migrant workers in Qatar received international attention.

=== Bangladeshis in Kuwait ===
Kuwait has long been an important destination for Bangladeshi labor migration. There are 350,000 Bangladeshi migrant workers in Kuwait. Bangladeshi workers in Kuwait are commonly employed in driving, cleaning, construction, domestic work and other service jobs.

=== Bangladeshis in Oman ===
Oman hosts a substantial Bangladeshi community. Oman has over 700,000 Bangladeshis. Bangladeshi women have also been studied in domestic work arrangements in the country. The community is often discussed in relation to overseas employment, consular services, and migrant welfare.

=== Bangladeshis in Lebanon ===
Lebanon has one of the more visible Bangladeshi migrant communities in the Levant. IOM's 2024 round reported that Bangladeshi nationals were the second-largest migrant group identified in Lebanon and represented 21 percent of the migrants recorded in that exercise, around 30,406 Bangladeshi nationals were identified in the monitoring round. Many Bangladeshi migrants in Lebanon work in domestic and service sectors and the community has been affected by economic crisis and wartime displacement.

=== Bangladeshis in Bahrain ===
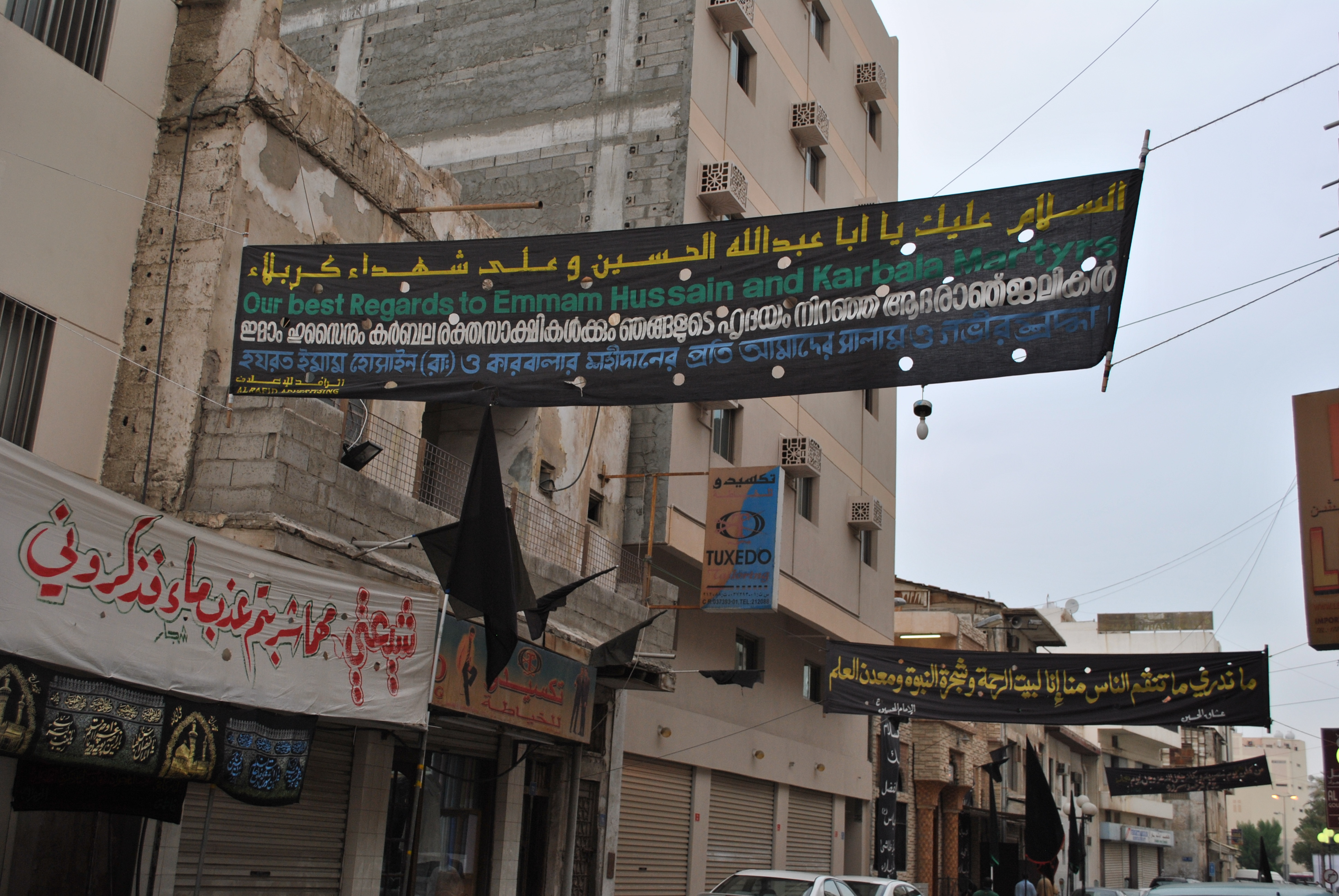
The use of the Bengali language in Bahrain

Bangladeshis are among Bahrain's larger expatriate communities and the Bangladeshi government has described the country as an important destination for Bangladeshi workers. The Bangladeshi community in Bahrain constitutes one of the largest expatriate communities in Bahrain, numbering around 130,000 people. Bangladeshi migrants in Bahrain have commonly worked in construction, cleaning, retail, tailoring, driving, fishing and hotel services. Labor rights organizations have documented cases of wage withholding, passport confiscation, and other abuses affecting migrant workers in Bahrain.

=== Bangladeshis in Jordan ===
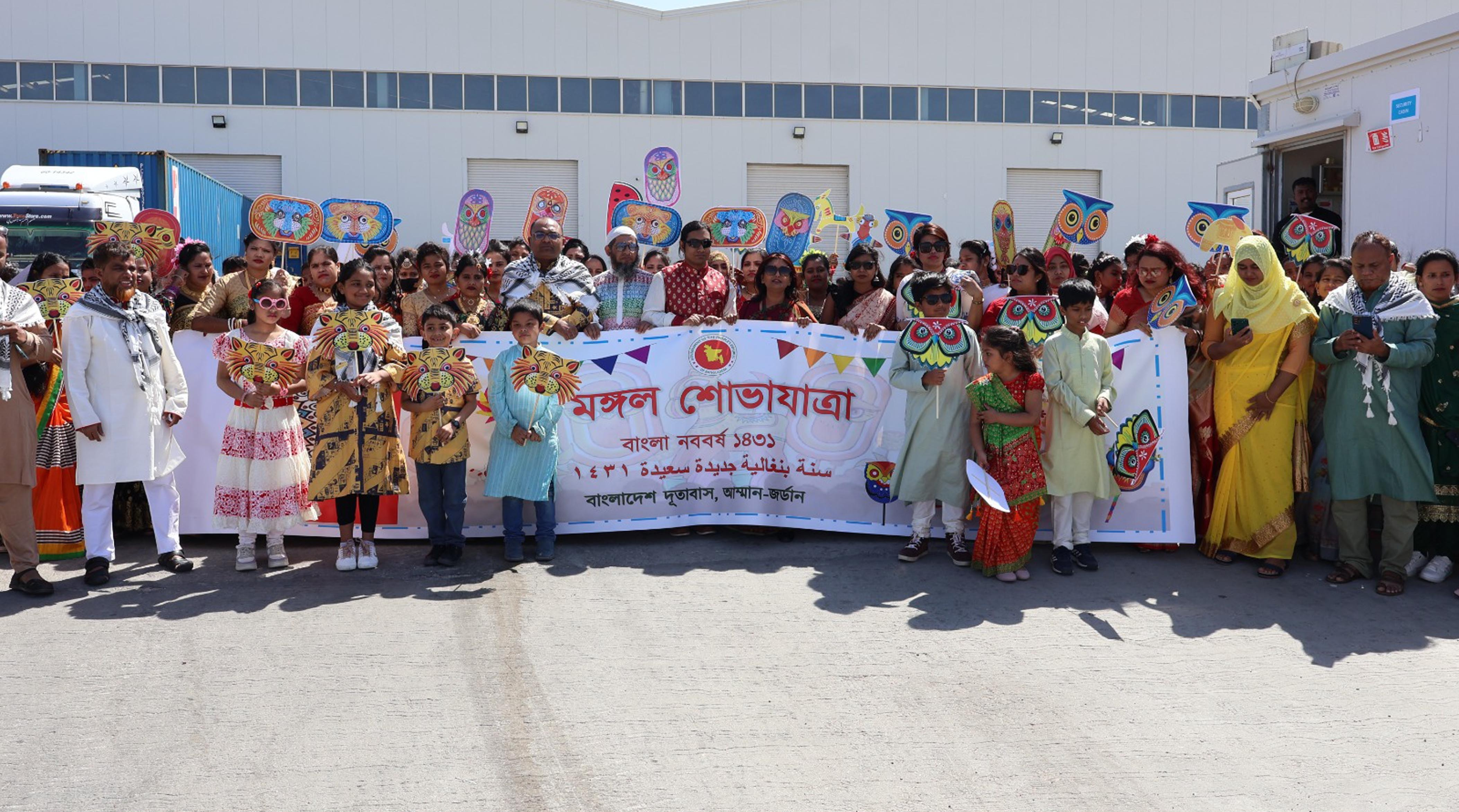
Mangal Shobhajatra at the Bangladesh Embassy in Jordan on the Bengali New Year

Jordan has a smaller Bangladeshi community than the Gulf's largest labor destinations, but Bangladeshi migrants are present in the country, particularly in the garment sector. IOM's 2024 report puts Bangladeshi migrants in Jordan at 8,626. ILO material on Jordan's garment industry notes the importance of migrant labor in factory production with Bangladeshi workers forming part of that workforce. Jordan has also periodically carried out regularisation or amnesty measures affecting undocumented migrant workers, including Bangladeshis.

=== Other Middle Eastern countries ===
Outside the largest Gulf destinations, Bangladeshi communities in the Middle East are usually smaller and more transitory.

Iraq has seen Bangladeshi labor migration as well as undocumented movement, and one estimate put the number of Bangladeshis there at around 50,000.

Iran has also been involved in emergency return movements, with IOM and the Government of Bangladesh facilitating evacuations of Bangladeshi nationals from Iran during crisis periods, recent reporting said around 2,000 Bangladeshis were believed to be in Iran, including about 400 in Tehran.

Bangladeshi presence in Syria is undocumented and is often discussed in connection with labor migration routes and evacuation corridors rather than a large settled diaspora. A foreign ministry report said the number of Bangladeshis still living in Syria was less than 100.

Turkey has often functioned as a transit country for Bangladeshi migrants heading toward Europe, and IOM has documented Bangladeshi migrants stranded there during irregular migration routes. The Embassy of Bangladesh in Ankara maintains services for Bangladeshi diaspora members and non-resident Bangladeshis in Türkiye.

Bangladeshi presence in Egypt is smaller than in the Gulf, but the Bangladesh embassy in Cairo has said that Egypt hosts around 4,000 to 5,000 Bangladeshi semi-skilled workers, most of whom are employed in the RMG and textile sectors. The embassy also describes its role in serving the Bangladeshi community through consular work and related services.

== Living conditions ==
Migrant labour in the region, from which Bangladeshi citizens form a sizable minority, are brought in through the kafala system, which provides employment-based visas and bars workers from attaining longer-term residency. Like other Asian expatriates, Bangladeshi citizens have sought work in the region primarily to send remittances back to their families and share little in common culturally with their host societies. Many have additionally been motivated by the proximity to Mecca in hopes of performing the rites of the Hajj.

Human rights organizations continue to report on widespread violations of labour and human rights of migrant workers in the Gulf region. Reported abuses include the confiscation of passports, mobility restrictions, excessive working hours, delayed or absent salary payments, sub-par working and living conditions, as well as sexual, physical and psychological abuse of workers by their employers.

== Notable people ==
- Syed Neaz Ahmad, academic, writer, journalist, and critic
- Rabiul Hoque, cricket umpire
- Elita Karim, singer, journalist, performer, anchor and voice artist.
- Emad Mostaque, founder and CEO of Stability AI
- Aamer Rahman, stand-up comedian

== See also ==
- Bangladeshis in Saudi Arabia
- Bangladeshis in the United Arab Emirates
- Demographics of Saudi Arabia
- Demographics of United Arab Emirates
- Demographics of Kuwait
- Demographics of Oman
- Demographics of Qatar
- Demographics of Bahrain
- Demographics of Jordan
- Demographics of Egypt
