= Bangladesh (disambiguation) =

Bangladesh is a country in South Asia.

Bangladesh or Bangla Desh may also refer to:

- "Bangla Desh" (song), a 1971 song by George Harrison
- Bangladeš, a Roma settlement in Novi Sad, Serbia
- Bangladesh: A Legacy of Blood, a 1986 book by Anthony Mascarenhas
- Bangladesh (record producer), Shondrae Lee Crawford (born 1978), American record producer, songwriter, and rapper

== See also ==
- Little Bangladesh (disambiguation)
- Bengal, the historic socio-cultural region in South Asia
