= MTV Desi =

Logo of broadcast channel

MTV Desi is a digital platform from MTV that targeted Desis (people of South Asian origin) in the United States, as the name implies. The network features various styles of music such as electronic tabla music and English-Gujarati hip-hop, interspersed with Bollywood videos. It also broadcasts brief documentary clips profiling Desis/famous Indians in music, comic skits about South-Asian American generational conflicts, interviews with bi-cultural artists and Desi house parties, live performances and animated series. It launched as a cable network on July 12, 2005 and was shut down in 2007. It was relaunched as a digital platform in 2012.

Rabbi Shergill's video "Bullah Ki Jaana" was the first video played on MTV Desi.
