= Bangladeshis in India =

Indians of Bangladeshi heritage

Bangladeshis in India are members of the Bangladesh diaspora who currently reside in India. The mass migration into India since Bangladesh independence has led to the creation of anti-foreigner movements, instances of mass violence and political tension between Bangladesh and India, but it has also created measurable economic benefits for both nations.

Estimates of the number of Bangladeshis in India vary widely. According to the 2001 Census of India, there were in India 3.1 million Bangladeshis based on place of last residence, and 3.7 million Bangladeshis based on place of birth. A different 2009 estimate claimed that there were 15 million Bangladeshis who had taken residence in the country. In 2007 the Indian government stated that there were up to 12 million Bangladeshis living in India illegally, though Samir Guha Roy of the Indian Statistical Institute called these estimates "motivatedly exaggerated". After examining the population growth and demographic statistics, Roy instead states that many of the presumed illegal Bangladeshis are actually Indian citizens migrating from neighbouring states.

== Pre partition – 1970s ==
Before the Partition of India internal migration was commonplace between the region which is now Bangladesh and the regions of Assam and West Bengal. While under colonial rule Assam was sparsely populated and the British, who wanted to exploit the resources from the region, wished to see it settled. Through internal migration labour was brought from the northern regions of India, West Bengal and the region which now comprises Bangladesh.

During the Bangladesh liberation war it is estimated that up to 10 million people fled from East Pakistan to India so as to escape the genocidal actions being carried out by the West Pakistan armed forces. There were outbreaks of cholera throughout the refugee camps, the World Health Organization estimated 51,000 cases and it is estimated that 3000 people died from the disease.

== Anti-immigrant reaction ==
In 1978, observers noticed the names of an estimated 45,000 Bengali illegal immigrants on the electoral rolls in Assam. This led to a popular movement against undocumented immigrants known as the Assam Movement, which insisted on striking the names of illegal immigrants from the electoral register and advocated for their deportation from the state. The movement demanded that anyone who had entered the state illegally since 1951 be deported, though the central government insisted on a cutoff date of 1971. There was widespread support for the movement, though it tapered off between 1981 and 1982.

Toward the end of 1982 the central government called elections, and the Assam Movement called for people to boycott them. This resulted in the 1983 Nellie massacre, described by Antara Datta, as one of the largest and most severe pogroms since the Second World War. Previously, the All Assam Students Union (AASU) had emphasised economic reasons for the protests and had employed only nonviolent methods. The Nellie massacre, a result of a buildup of resentment over immigration, claimed the lives of at least 2,191 people, though unofficial figures run to more than 5,000. No investigation of the incident has ever been launched. The AASU denied any involvement in the massacre, and since then there have been no instances of communal violence in Upper Assam.

In India and Pakistan, the word Kanglu is used online as a derogatory insult targeting Bangladeshis in a mocking and demeaning way.

== Estimates of Bangladeshis in India ==
Samir Guha Roy of the Indian Statistical Institute called the government estimates of illegal Bangladeshis "motivatedly exaggerated". After examining the population growth and demographic statistics, Roy instead states that a significant numbers of internal migration is sometimes falsely thought to be illegal immigrants. An analysis of the numbers by Roy revealed that on average around 91000 Bangladeshi nationals might have crossed over to India every year during the years 1981–1991, but how many of them were identified and pushed back is not known. It is possible that a large portion of these immigrants returned on their own to their place of origin.

Most of the Bengali speaking people deported from Maharashtra as illegal immigrants are originally Indian citizens from West Bengal. In Assam, Muslims are usually targeted by the protesters, being branded as illegal immigrants, "though many have lived in the region for generations". There were also reports of harassment of Muslims in the char areas by policemen despite submitting proof of citizenship.

In 2004, Sriprakash Jaiswal, India's minister of state for home affairs, stated in the Indian parliament that, there were 12 million illegal Bangladeshis in the country, of whom 5 million were in Assam, as of 31 December 2001. However, according to Prateek Hajela, the NRC's coordinator in Assam, the number of identified illegal immigrants in the state were "in thousands" after covering a third of the total population in 2016. According to Prodyut Bora, a former Bharatiya Janata Party leader, "Bangladeshis would have very little, if any motivation to migrate to Assam, since all indicators of development in Bangladesh are better than Assam."

As per the insights shared by Dhaka University's esteemed Professor, Dr. Abul Barkat, as reported by the Dhaka Tribune, approximately 2.3 lakh Hindus migrate from Bangladesh to India every year seeking refugee.

== See also ==
- Bangladesh–India relations
- Illegal Migrants (Determination by Tribunal) Act, 1983
- East Bengali refugees
- Migrant labourers in Kerala
