= Bangladeshis in the Maldives =

Bangladeshis in Maldives
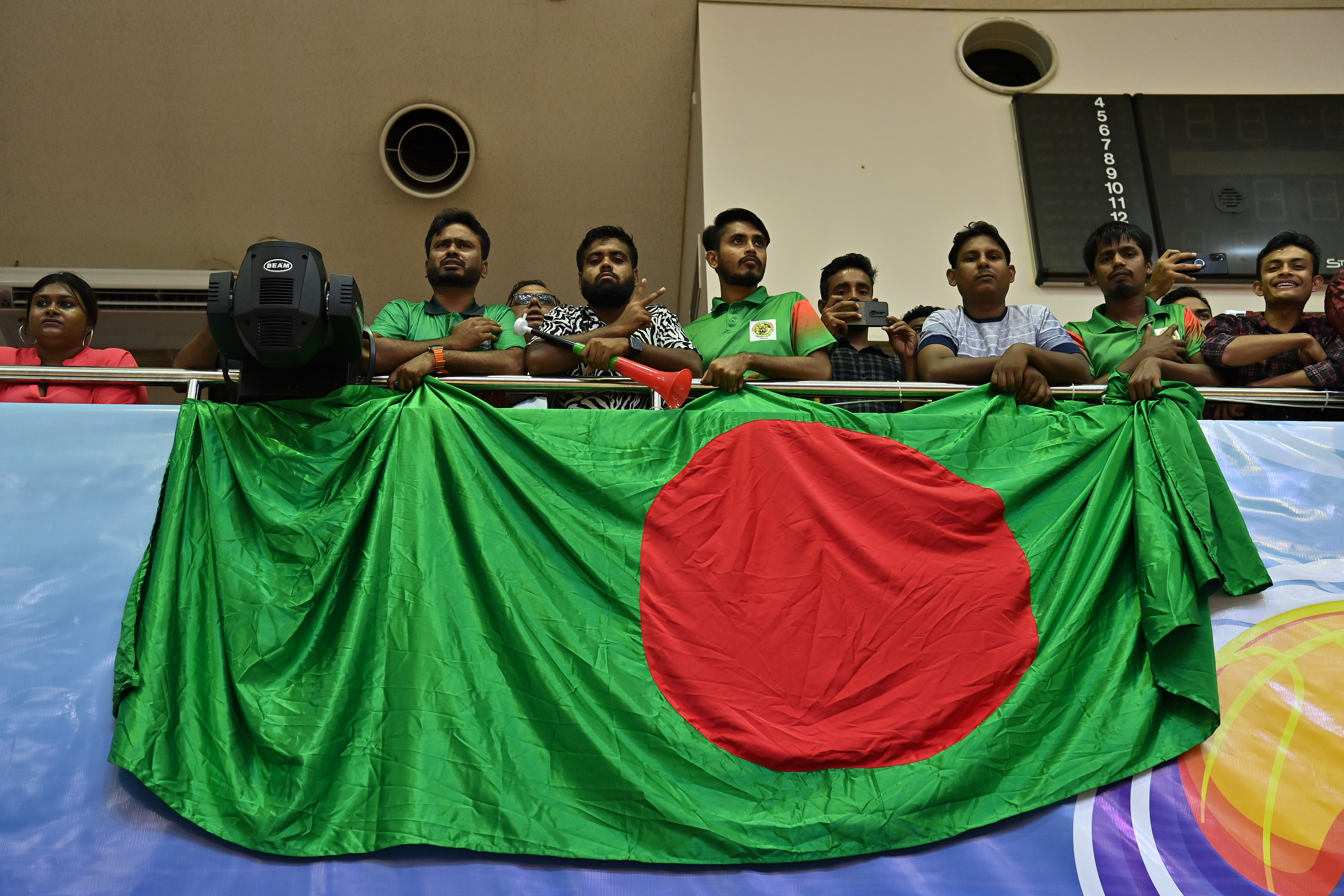
- Bangladeshi supporters in the Maldives during a basketball game

Total population
- Est. 80,000 immigrants of Bengali origin with one-third having no valid documents

Regions with significant populations
- Malé

Languages
- English, Bengali, Dhivehi

Religion
- Islam

Bangladeshis in the Maldives are a part of the Bangladeshi diaspora, consists people of Bangladeshi descent who have immigrated to or were born in another country. In most cases, first generation migrants may have moved abroad from Bangladesh for better living conditions, to escape poverty, or to send money back to families in Bangladesh. Till now, most Bangladeshis in the Maldives are first generation immigrants.

The 14th-century Moroccan traveller Ibn Battuta identified Sultan Salahuddin Salih as a Bengali and credited him for the establishment of a new dynasty in the Maldives including his son Omar I and a granddaughter, Khadijah. Other records have also mentioned a granddaughter of Alauddin Husain Shah being a queen in the Maldives too.

According to the Maldives Homeland Security and Technology ministry around 90,000 Bangladeshi are now (2024) working in the Maldives, a nation of only around 515,132 people , with currently most them have valid documents work permit This is a major portion among all the foreign workers in the Maldives.
