= Tassduq Ahmad =

British-Bangladeshi politician, social worker, and activist

Tassaduq Ahmed
- Born: April 2, 1923
- Died: December 8, 2001

Tassaduq Ahmed, born Tassaduq Ahmed Chowdhury, MBE, was a British-Bangladeshi politician, social worker, and activist.

== Early life ==
Ahmad was born on 2 April 1923 in Golapganj Upazila, Sylhet District, Assam, British India. His father, Madris Ahmad Chowdhury, was a bureaucrat. In 1943, he removed Chowdhury from his name due to the name being a Zamindar title. He was the general secretary of the All Assam Muslim Students Federation and campaigned in the 1947 Sylhet referendum, which resulted in Sylhet District being separated from Assam and joined to East Bengal (present Bangladesh).

== Career ==
Ahmad worked as a journalist in the Daily Pakistan Observer (which became The Bangladesh Observer). He also worked at the Daily Sangbad.

Ahmad was involved in the 1952 Bengali language movement and had to flee East Pakistan for Great Britain after the government tried to detain him for his involvement in the movement.

Ahmad published two newspapers in England, Desher Dak and Eastern News. He opened a restaurant called the Ganges in Gerrard Street, Soho, London. He was given an MBE, Member of the British Empire, by the British government in 1989.

== Death ==
Ahmad died on 8 December 2001.
