= Bangladeshis in Saudi Arabia =

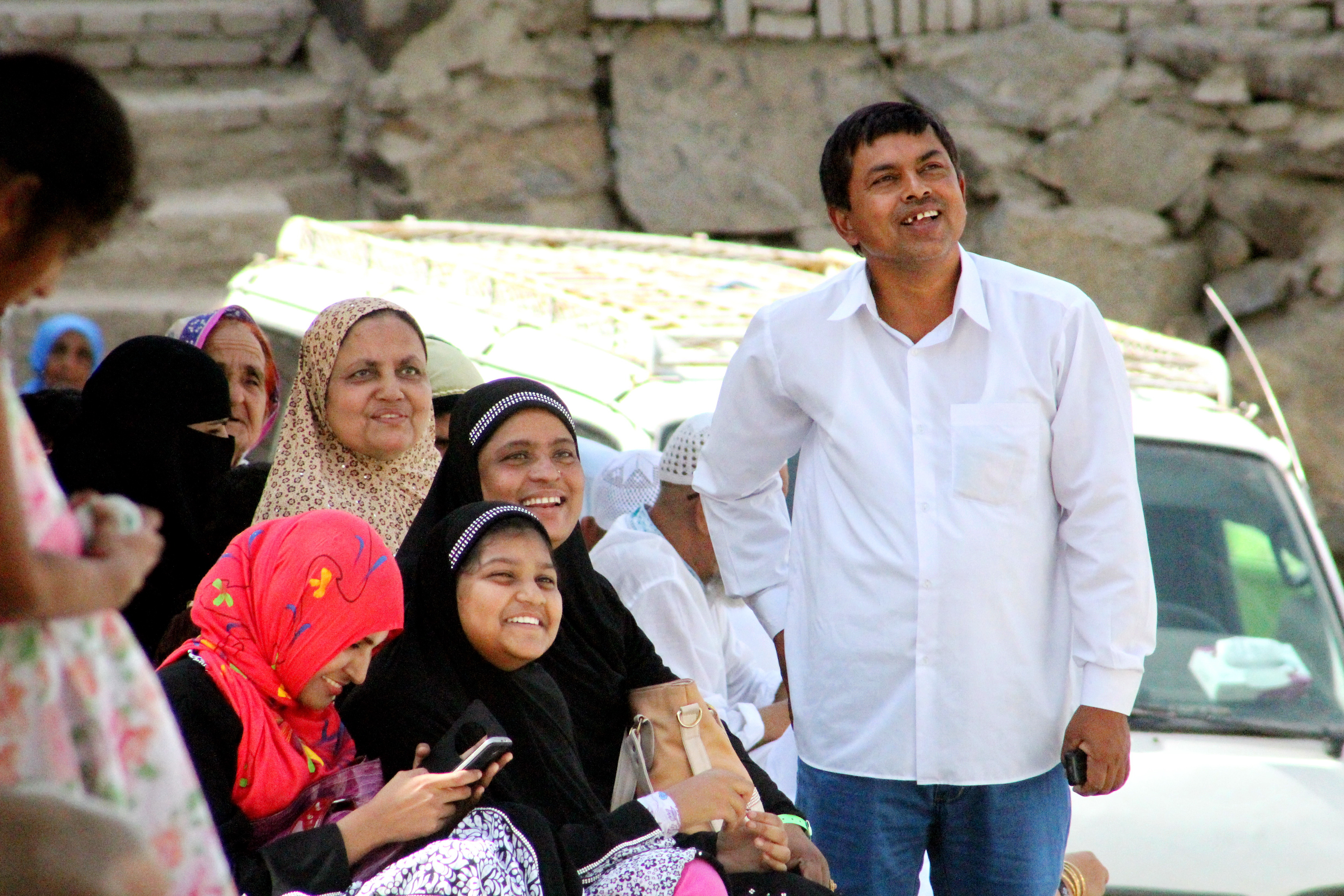
- A Bangladeshi family at Jabal al-Nour in the Mecca area

Total population
- 2,116,192 (2022 census) (2022)

Religion
- Islam

Bangladeshis in Saudi Arabia number around 2.6 million. Saudi Arabia is the top destination country for Bangladeshi migrant workers, with almost 100,000 Bangladeshis migrating to Saudi Arabia in the last quarter of 2022. Most Bangladeshis in Saudi Arabia work in the service industry.

== Context for Bangladeshi Temporary Migration ==
The overarching impetus for migration is the presence of poverty, and pursuit of a better livelihood and economic standing. These migrations tend to be temporary as opposed to permanent (either short-term or long-term), due to the flow of remittances from these job. In 2015, Bangladesh was ninth in the world for top remittance recipients, with it accounting for approximately 8% of their GDP (around $15.4 billion). Recently, there has also been research pointing towards the role of climate change in shaping migration as well. A paper published in 2021 researches the role of coastal climate change for migration in Bangladesh. Climate change was attributed as being a risk to livelihood, reducing food security, and increasing poverty, hunger and malnutrition.

Recruitment agencies in Bangladesh play a significant role in the curation of this migrant labor force. These include public and private for-profit organizations. Private recruiters, known as dalals (দালাল), charge unregulated fees to prospective workers with the promise of finding them good work; this process tends to put the migrant and their family in debt. There is also a pattern and concentration of migration from Bangladesh to the Gulf countries, the most common of which is the United Arab Emirates (UAE), and overall to other majority Muslim countries.

== History ==
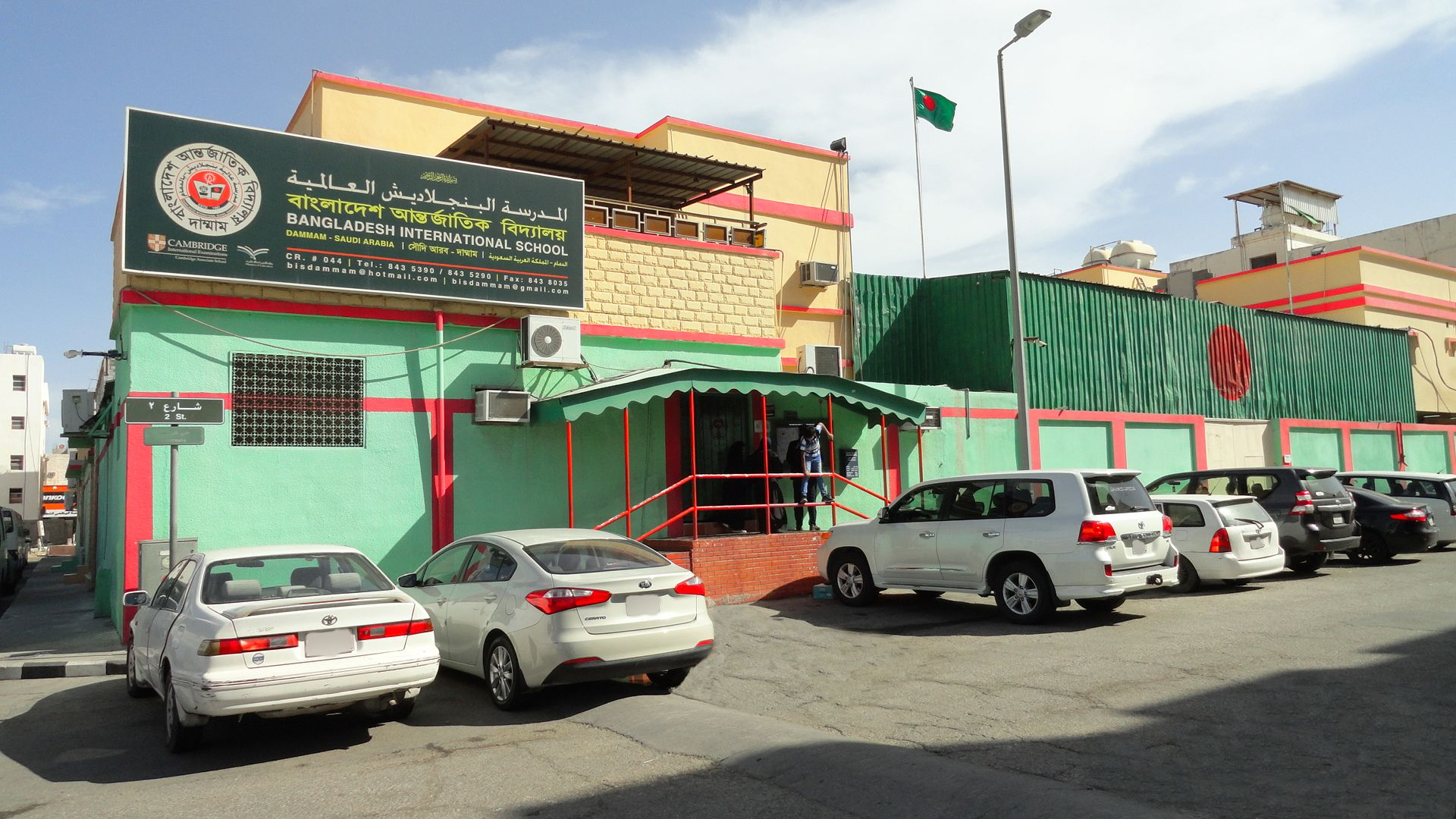
Bangladesh International School, Dammam

In 2016, Saudi Arabia lifted a seven-year ban on the recruitment of Bangladeshi workers in the country.

== See also ==
- Bangladesh–Saudi Arabia relations
- Bangladeshis in the Middle East
- Foreign workers in Saudi Arabia
- Migrant workers in the Gulf Cooperation Council region
  - Treatment of South Asian labourers in the Gulf Cooperation Council region
