= Shaikh Khalifa Bin Zayed Bangladesh Islamia School =

School in Abu Dhabi

Coordinates: 24.43592°N 54.43940°E

Shaikh Khalifa Bin Zayed Bangladesh Islamia Private School LLC
- Type: Primary, Secondary and Higher Secondary School
- Established: 23 August 1980
- Students: 800+ (2023)
- Location: Abu Dhabi, Emirate of Abu Dhabi, United Arab Emirates
- Website: bdschooluae.com

Shaikh Khalifa Bin Zayed Bangladesh Islamia School & College (Arabic: مدرسة الشیخ خلیفة بن زاید البنغلادیشیة الاسلامیة الخاصة Bengali: শেখ খলিফা বিন জায়েদ বাংলাদেশ ইসলামিয়া স্কুল) is an educational institute providing academic education to Bangladeshi and international students in Abu Dhabi, UAE, for secondary and higher secondary education. Special emphasis is given to English, Arabic, Bengali, and Islamic Studies for Muslim students in Abu Dhabi.

== History ==
The school was founded on 23 August 1980, and began operations with class I to class V. In 1990, it moved to a new building in Abu Dhabi on land donated by Sheikh Zayed bin Sultan Al Nahyan. A college section was added in 1991.

The school was one of four to win a Zayed Future Energy Prize in the Global High School category in 2013. They won for their plans to reduce the school's energy consumption by 40 percent, a proposal driven by the school's eco club. Energy-efficient lighting installed in 2012 reduced energy use by 15 percent. The school used the $100,000 award to install solar panels on its auditorium roof that produce a further 15 percent of their energy needs, and to partner with the University of Leeds on the design and construction of wind towers to passively cool school buildings.
