= Little Bangladesh =

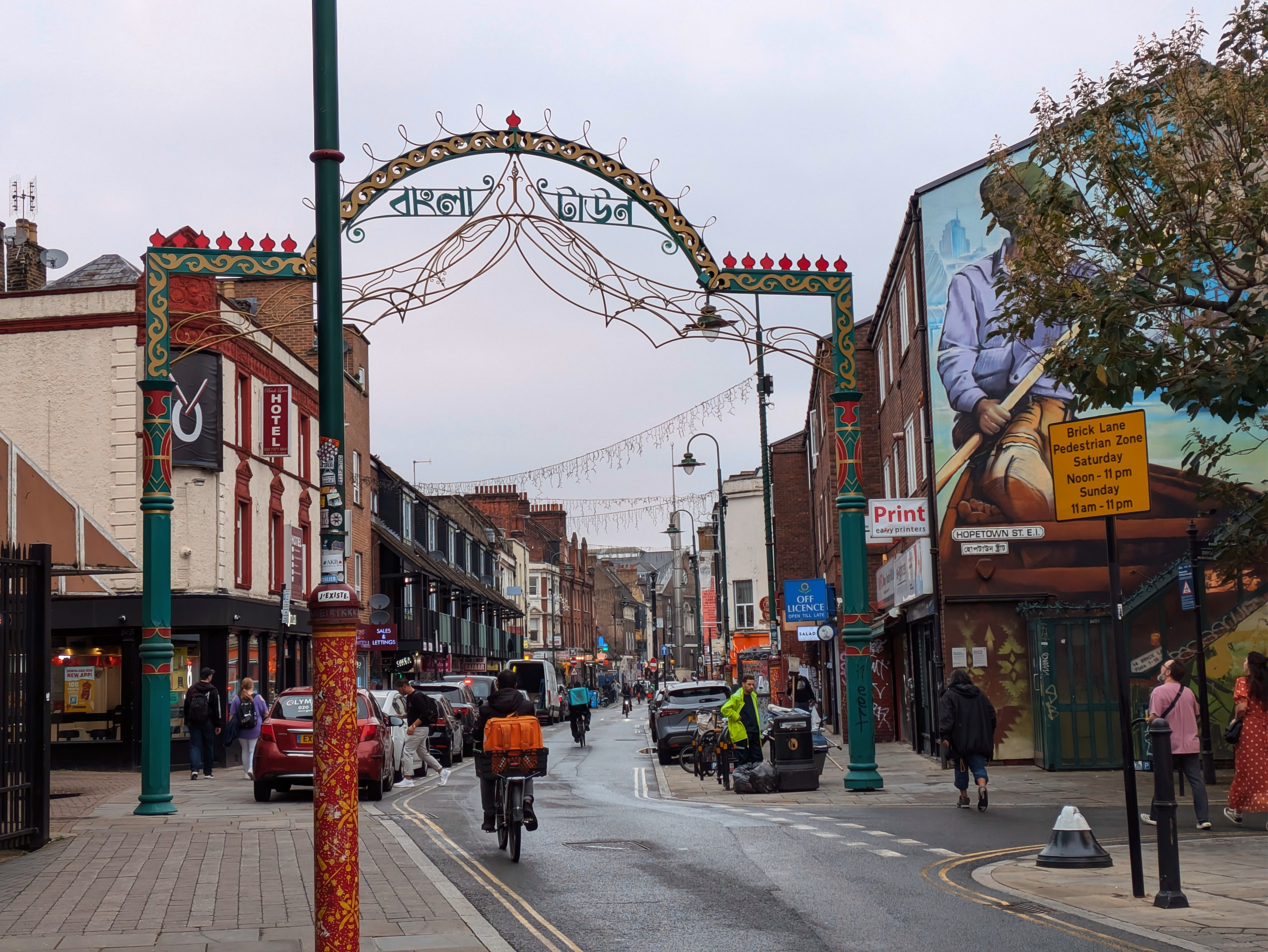
An arch with "Bangla Town" written in Bengali, on Brick Lane in Whitechapel, London, England

Little Bangladesh is a general name for an ethnic enclave populated primarily by Bangladeshi immigrants and people of Bangladeshi ancestry (overseas Bangladeshis), usually in an urban neighborhood all over the world.

== Locations ==
- Little Bangladesh, Brooklyn
- Little Bangladesh, Los Angeles
- Banglatown, Detroit
- Brick Lane, London, also known as Banglatown
- Lakemba, Sydney, NSW Australia

== See also ==
- Curry Row in Manhattan, a group of South Asian restaurants operated by Bangladeshis
- Lakemba, a suburb of Sydney, Australia whose current population is 12% Bengali
