= Bangladeshis =

People of Bangladesh

Bangladeshi
বাংলাদেশী
- Flag of Bangladesh

Total population
- c. 190 million+

Regions with significant populations
- Bangladesh ~176 million
- Diaspora: c. 13-15 Million
- India: 2,300,000–3,700,000 (mostly immigrants, 2011 census) (Note: Per the 2011 census of India there were 2.3 million people in India with ancestral homes in Bangladesh and 3.7 million who were born in Bangladesh.)
- Pakistan: 3,000,000
- Saudi Arabia: 2,116,192
- UAE: 1,090,000
- Malaysia: 898,970
- Oman: 680,242
- United Kingdom: 652,535~1,000,000
- Qatar: 400,000
- Italy: 400,000
- Kuwait: 350,000
- United States: 600,000
- South Africa: 300,000
- Bahrain: 180,000
- Lebanon: 160,000
- Jordan: 150,000
- Singapore: 150,000
- Maldives: 150,000
- Greece: 80,000
- Canada: 75,425
- Portugal: 70,000 (2024)
- Australia: 51,491
- Spain: 50,000
- Japan: 40,045
- Brunei: 30,000–40,000
- Mauritius: 25,000
- South Korea: 22,000
- Libya: 20,000
- Poland: 18,000
- Germany: 16,410
- Egypt: 15,000
- France: 15,000
- Sweden: 10,000
- Vietnam: 8,000
- Finland: 7,000
- Brazil: 6,000
- Netherlands: 6,000
- Belgium: 5,000
- Ireland: 4,000
- Austria: 3,300
- Switzerland: 3,000
- China: 20,000
- New Zealand: 2,337
- Denmark: 2,000
- Russia: 2,000
- Cyprus: 2,000
- Norway: 1,696
- Turkey: 1,513
- Czechia: 1,000
- Bulgaria: 1,000

Languages
- Bengali, Assamese, various languages of Bangladesh; English

Religion
- Majority: Islam; Minority: Hinduism, Buddhism, Christianity and others (including atheism, agnosticism and unaffiliated)

Related ethnic groups
- other Indo-Aryan peoples

Bangladeshis (Bengali: বাংলাদেশী [ˈbaŋladeʃi]) are the citizens and nationals of Bangladesh, a South Asian country centred on the transnational historical region of Bengal along the eponymous bay.

Bangladeshi citizenship was formed in 1971, when the permanent residents of the former East Pakistan were transformed into citizens of a new republic. Bangladesh is the world's eighth most populous nation. The vast majority of Bangladeshis are ethnolinguistically Bengali. The population of Bangladesh is concentrated in the fertile Bengal delta, which has been the centre of urban and agrarian civilizations for millennia. The country's highlands, including the Chittagong Hill Tracts and parts of the Sylhet Division, are home to various tribal minorities.

Bengali Muslims are the predominant ethnoreligious group of Bangladesh, with a population of 150.36 million, which makes up 91.04% of the country's population as of 2022. The minority Bengali Hindu population made up approximately 7.95% of the population of the country according to the 2022 Census Non-Bengali Muslims make up the largest immigrant community; while the Tibeto-Burman Chakmas, who speak the Indo-Aryan Chakma language, are the largest indigenous ethnic group after Bengalis. The Austroasiatic Santhals are the largest aboriginal community.

The Bangladeshi diaspora is concentrated in the Arab world, North America and the United Kingdom. A significant number of Non-Resident Bangladeshis (NRBs) have dual citizenship in different countries.

== Terminology ==
Bangladesh in Asia

After Independence of Bangladesh in 1971, Bangladeshis, as a nationality, have been referred to by various terms:

- Bangladeshis, the most widely used term to refer to the citizens of Bangladesh, comes from Bangladesh (meaning "Country of Bengal"), and can be traced to the early 20th century. Then, the term was used by Bengali patriotic songs like Namo Namo Namo Bangladesh Momo, by Kazi Nazrul Islam, and Aaji Bangladesher Hridoy, by Rabindranath Tagore.
- Bangalees, an exonym for Bengalis, was used between 1972 and 1978 by the Constitution of Bangladesh for all citizens of Bangladesh, despite 2% of the population being indigenous and immigrant non-Bengalis. Under President Ziaur Rahman, the constitutional term was changed to Bangladeshi, as part of efforts to promote Bangladeshi nationalism. The term "Bangalee" is still used to denote people of Bangladesh as a nation.

None of these terms should be conflated with Bengalis, the name of the predominant ethnic group in the country who make up the bulk of all Bangladeshis.

== Demographics ==
The region of Bengal was settled by people of diverse origins, including Indo-Aryan, Dravidian, Tibeto-Burman and Austroasiatic ancestry, with the most ancient settlements traced back to 4000 BCE.

=== Religious demographics ===
Religions in Bangladesh (2022)
1. Islam (91.0%)
2. Hinduism (7.95%)
3. Buddhism (0.61%)
4. Christianity (0.30%)
5. Others (0.12%)

Bangladesh has a 2024 population of 174 million according to United Nations projections. As per as 2020 estimation research, around 13 million Bangladeshis live abroad in various foreign nations. The estimated total population of all Bangladeshis including the ones who are living in their country and abroad is about 187 million as per 2020–21 estimation.

Bangladesh religious diversity as per 2022 census
Religion	Population	%
Muslims	150,360,404	91.04%
Hindus	13,130,109	7.95%
Buddhists	1,007,467	0.61%
Christians	495,475	0.30%
Others	198,190	0.12%
Total	165,158,616	100%

=== Bengalis ===
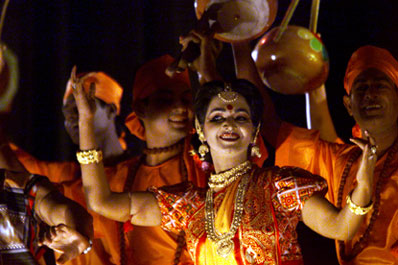
Bangladeshi artists performing in a dance show

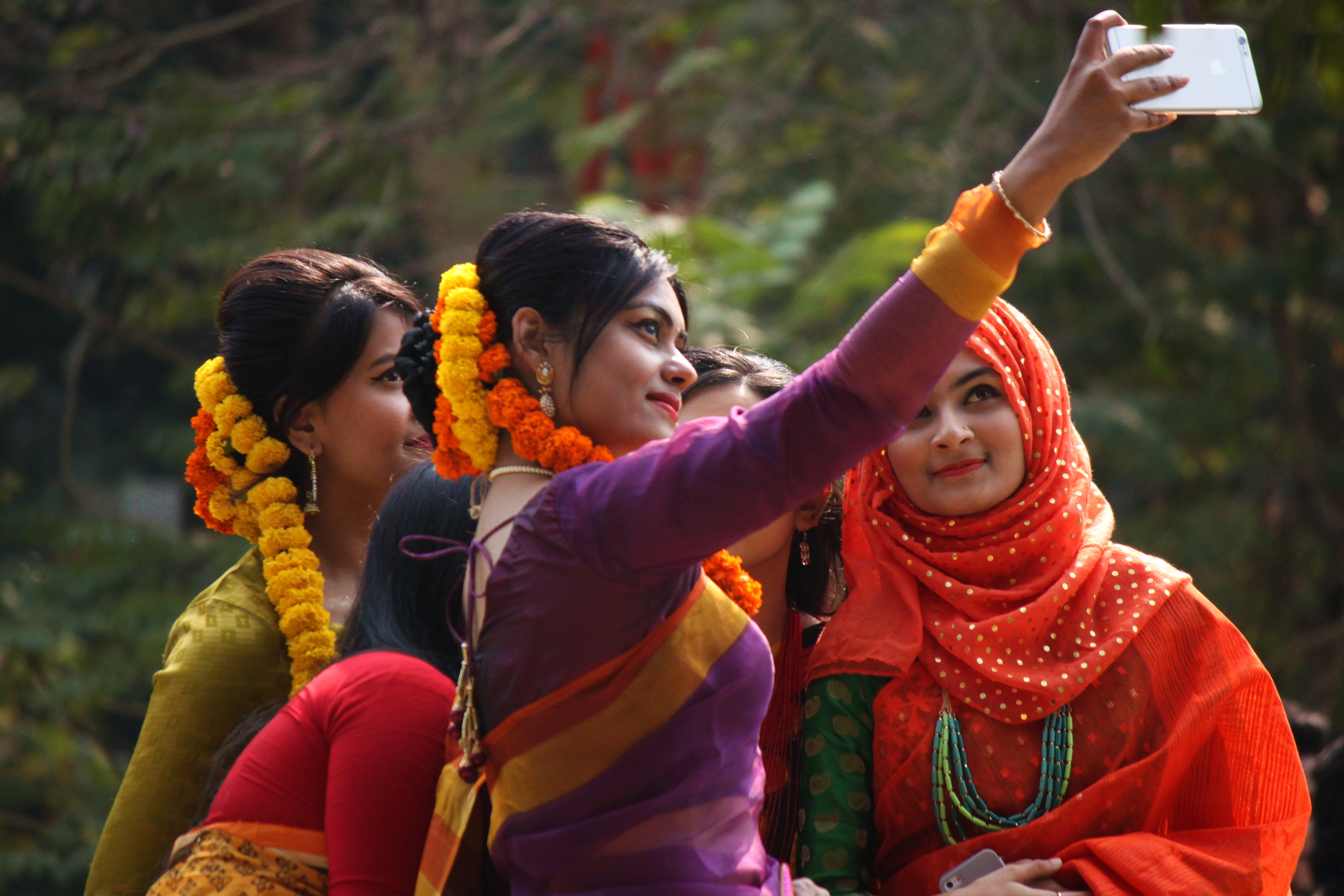
Bangladeshi girls taking Selfie at Pohela Falgun

Approximately 99% of the Bangladeshis are Bengalis. East Bengal was a prosperous melting pot for centuries. It witnessed a synthesis of Islamic, North Indian and indigenous Bengali cultures. Today, Bengalis enjoy strong cultural homogeneity with a common standardized language and a variety of dialects.

Over 91.04% of the population are Bengali Muslims (150.36 million) as of 2022. This makes Bangladesh the world's third largest Muslim majority country after Indonesia and Pakistan. Bengali Muslims also make up the world's second largest Muslim ethnic group after Arab Muslims. Most Bangladeshi Muslims are member of the Sunni branch of Islam. There are significant minorities of the Shia and Ahmadiya branches. Bengali Hindus are the largest minority of Bangladesh, with a population between 13.1 million constituting 7.95% as per 2022 Census. Bangladesh has the third largest Hindu population in the world after India and Nepal. There are an estimated 400,000 Bengali Christians and 500,000 Bengali Buddhists.

The Bengali population is concentrated in Bengal delta, the coastal areas of Chittagong Division and the river valleys of Sylhet-Division.

=== Non-Bengali Muslims ===
An estimated 3 million Bangladeshi citizens are non-Bengali Muslim immigrants from different parts of South Asia. They include affluent sections of the country's merchant and business class, particularly Nizari Ismailism adherents. They also include former Stranded Pakistanis and their descendants. Bangladesh's non-Bengali Muslims are usually fluent in both Bengali and Hindustani. Also there are over 1 million Rohingya Muslim refugees living in Bangladesh who came here during the period of (2016–17) crisis. On 28 September 2018, at the 73rd United Nations General Assembly, Bangladeshi Prime Minister Sheikh Hasina said there are 1.1–1.3 million Rohingya refugees now settled in Bangladesh.

=== Tribes of the Chittagong Hill Tracts ===
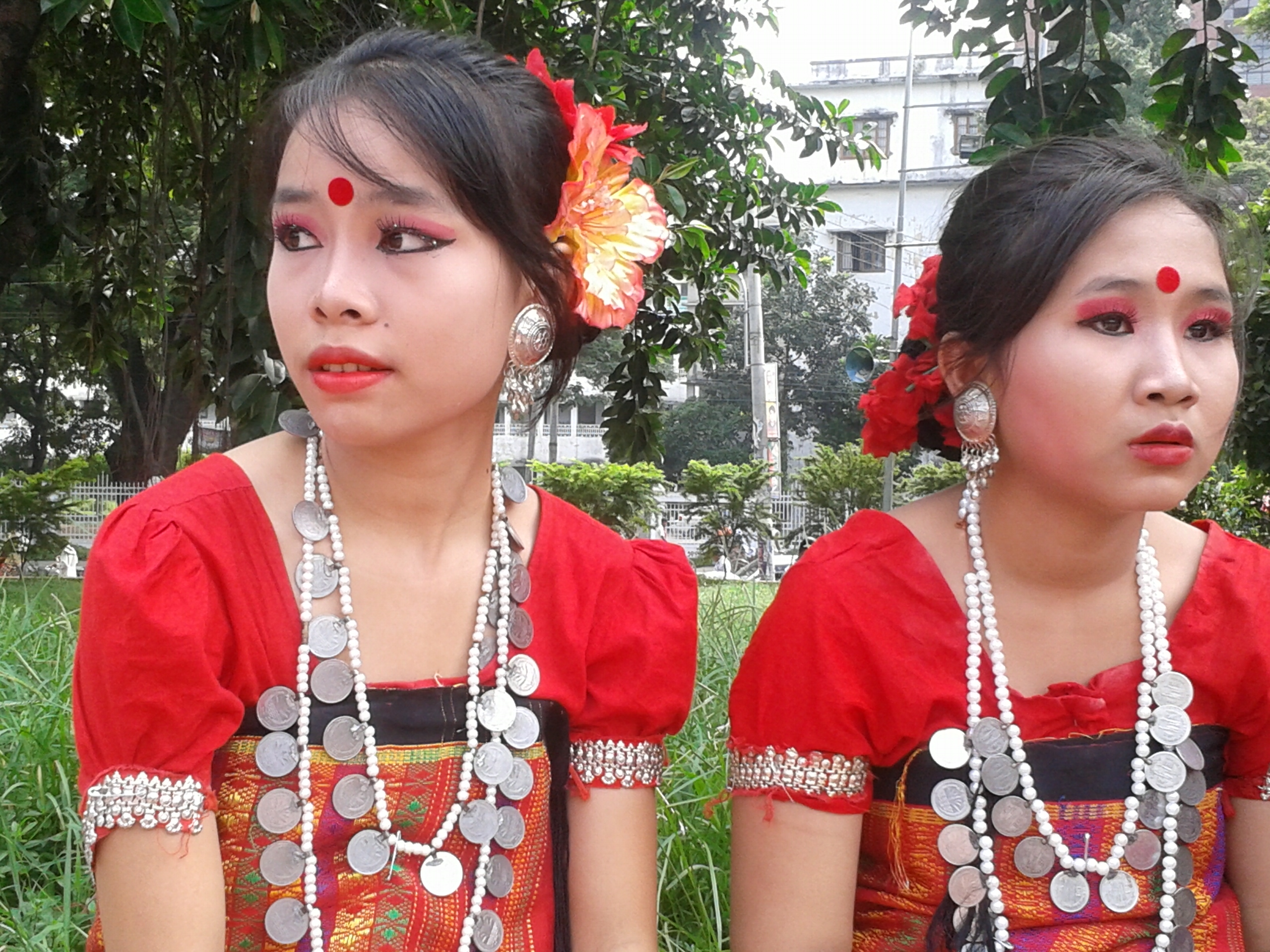
Chakma dancers in a village in Chittagong hill track.

In southeastern Bangladesh, the Chittagong Hill Tracts frontier has a distinct history. It was an exclusive zone for Tibeto-Burman tribes in Bengal during the British Raj. Today, the area makes up 10% of Bangladesh's territory. It is home to several indigenous ethnic groups in the three hill districts of Rangamati, Bandarban and Khagrachari. The three largest communities in the region have a Raja as their tribal chief who is recognized by the Government of Bangladesh.

- The Chakma people are the largest tribe of the Chittagong Hill Tracts and the second largest indigenous ethnic group of Bangladesh after Bengalis. A Tibeto-Burman community, have been greatly influenced by Bengali culture, including in their native Chakma language, a branch of the Bengali-Assamese languages. Most Chakmas are concentrated in Rangamati District. The community is headed by the Chakma Raja. The majority of Chakmas are Therevada Buddhists, with a minority being Hindu.
- The Marma people are second largest community in the Chittagong Hill Tracts. They have a Raja and are concentrated in the districts of Bandarban and Khagrachari. The Marmas are originally Arakanese people who moved to the territory in the 17th century in order to escape Burmese persecution.
- The Mro people are the third largest community in the region and have a Raja. Buddhism, Christianity and animist beliefs are among the chief faiths of the Mros. Their population is concentrated in Bandarban District. Mros are originally related to the Chin people of Myanmar.
- The Tanchangya people are among the oldest native indigenous tribes of the region. They speak the Indo-Aryan Tanchangya language and adhere to Therevada Buddhism.
- The Bawm people are a Tibeto-Burman Christian community. They are among the oldest inhabitants of the region.
- The Tripuri people inhabit much of Khagrachhari District. Their population is divided between Bangladesh and their larger indigenous homeland in the Indian state of Tripura.
- The Khumi people are one of the poorest and smallest tribes of the region. They originate from the Arakan region.
- The Kuki people are Bangladeshi counterparts of Chins in northern Myanmar and Mizos in northeast India.

=== Ethnic groups of North and Northeast Bangladesh ===
There are several Austroasiatic, Tibeto-Burman and Indo-Aryan ethnic groups which inhabit parts of northern and northeastern Bangladesh.

- The Manipuri people (also called as Meitei people) speak Meitei language (better known as "Manipuri language"), write in Manipuri script (Meitei script), besides the Eastern Nagari script and are known for the Manipuri classical dance, developed by the Meitei king Rajarshi Bhagyachandra (Meitei: Ching Thang Khomba), the Maharajah of erstwhile Manipur Kingdom.
- The Santhal people are the largest aboriginal community of the country. They speak the Austroasiatic Santhali language. Their culture is noted for martial dance traditions. Their population is most concentrated in Rajshahi Division and Rangpur Division. The Santhals have been the focal point of land rights controversies as the Bangladeshi government seeks to develop open pit coal mining in their tribal hinterlands.
- The Garo people inhabit the Haluaghat Upazila of Mymensingh District. They have high literacy rates and are adherents of Christianity.
- The Bisnupriya Manipuri people speaks Bishnupriya, a creole of Bengali language and Meitei language (officially known as "Manipuri language") and it still retains its pre-Bengali features.
- A negligible small minority of Marwari people live in various cities and towns of the country such as Dinajpur, Kushtia and Narayanganj. Although many of them have been assimilated into the larger Hindu Bengali demographics, they still use the marwari surnames such as Agarwal, Singhania etc. They are among the affluent sections of the country's merchant and business class.

=== Tribes of Southern Bangladesh ===
- An Arakanese Rakhine community has resided in Barisal Division for three centuries. They arrived by the sea after escaping Burmese conquests in the 17th century.

== Society ==
=== Rural society ===
The basic social unit in a village is the family (poribar or gushti), generally consisting of a complete or incomplete patrilineally extended household (chula) and residing in a homestead (bari). The individual nuclear family often is submerged in the larger unit and might be known as the house (ghor). Above the bari level, patrilineal kin ties are linked into sequentially larger groups based on real, fictional, or assumed relationships.

A significant unit larger than that of close kin is the voluntary religious and mutual benefit association known as "the society" (shomaj or milat). Among the functions of a shomaj might be the maintenance of a Mosque and support of a mullah. An informal council of shomaj elders (matabdars or shordars) settles disputes taking place in the village. Factional competition between the motobdars is a major dynamic of social and political interaction.

Groups of homes in a village are called Paras, and each para has its own name. Several paras constitute a mauza, the basic revenue and census survey unit. The traditional character of rural villages was changing in the latter half of the 20th century with the addition of brick structures of one or more stories scattered among the more common thatched bamboo huts.

Although farming has traditionally been ranked among the most desirable occupations, villagers in the 1980s began to encourage their children to leave the increasingly overcrowded countryside to seek more secure employment in the towns. Traditional sources of prestige, such as landholding, distinguished lineage, and religious piety were beginning to be replaced by modern education, higher income, and steadier work. These changes, however, did not prevent rural poverty from increasing greatly.

=== Urban society ===
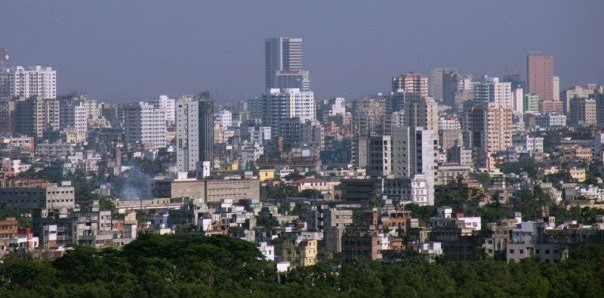
View of downtown Dhaka, the largest city in Bangladesh and one of the world's most populated cities

In 2015, 34% of Bangladeshis lived in cities. Dhaka is the largest city in Bangladesh and one of the world's most populous megacities. Other important cities include Chittagong, Sylhet, Khulna, Rajshahi, Bogura, Jessore, Barisal, Comilla, Narayanganj and Mymensingh. Most urban centres are rural administrative towns. Urban centres grew in number and population during the 1980s as a result of an administrative decentralization program that featured the creation of upazilas.

== Identity ==
Bangladesh is noted for cultural pluralism within a Bengali Muslim majority. Secularism has been an important contributor to the nation's society and ethos. The Bengali language is a fundamental element of Bangladeshi identity. It is a secular language which evolved between the 7th and 10th centuries, with an indigenous alphabet, and unites people of different faiths and regions. The Bengali language movement sowed the seeds of East Pakistani nationalism, ultimately culminating in the Bangladesh Liberation War in 1971. Since independence, the relationship between religion and the state has been controversial. Between 1972 and 1975, Bangladesh experienced socialism under a secular parliamentary system. Military coups ushered a sixteen-year presidential regime, which restored the free market and promoted moderate Islamism. In 1988, Islam was made the state religion. In 2010, the Bangladesh Supreme Court reaffirmed the principle of separation of mosque and state in the constitution. The government generally respects freedom of religion and ensures protection for minorities. Another debate on national identity concerns attitudes towards the Chittagong Hill Tracts. A low-level insurgency took place in the region to demand constitutional autonomy against Bengali settlements. Despite a peace treaty in 1997, the Bangladeshi government is yet to implement many of its commitments to protect adibashi land rights. However, the deletion in 1977 of Bangalee as the nationality term for the country's citizens, in order to be inclusive of non-Bengali minorities, also reflects attempts to build a more cosmopolitan Bangladeshi society.

== Culture ==
The culture of Bangladesh has evolved with influences from diverse social societies. Bangladesh's main religion is Islam, which has played a critical part in influencing the country's culture.

=== Languages ===
The word Wikipedia written in the Bengali script

The official language of Bangladesh is Bengali, which is shared with the neighbouring Indian states of West Bengal, Assam, and Tripura. Bengali dialects vary between different regions of Bangladesh but Standard Bengali is the most widely used.

According to the Ethnologue, there are 36 indigenous living languages, which include 17 Sino-Tibetan, 10 Indo-European, 7 Austro-Asiatic and 2 Dravidian languages.

The oldest literary inscription in Bangladesh dates back to the 3rd century BCE. It was found at Mahasthangarh and is written in the Brahmi script. The language is Magadhi Prakrit. The Bengali language developed from Magadhi Prakrit, and it's written from Apabhramsa, between the 7th and 10th centuries. It once formed a single eastern Indo-Aryan language with Assamese and Odia, but later became distinct. It became an official language of the Sultanate of Bengal, where it was spoken as the main vernacular language. It absorbed vocabulary from Arabic, Persian and Sanskrit. Bengali is the 6th most spoken first language in the world. The language was modernized during the Bengali Renaissance in the 19th century. It has influenced other languages in the region, including Chakma, Rohingya, Assamese, Odia and Nepali. The indigenous Bengali alphabets descended from Brahmi serves as the Bengali script.

The Bengali language movement in East Pakistan was a key catalyst for forming Bangladeshi identity. It is commemorated by UNESCO as International Mother Language Day, as part of worldwide efforts to preserve linguistic heritage.

Bangladesh is also home to number of minority indigenous languages, including Santhali, Garo, Marma, Manipuri language (Meitei language), Chakma and Bisnupriya Manipuri.

=== Surnames ===
Bangladeshi Muslims typically carry surnames that have Arabic, Persian and Sanskrit origins. Bangladeshi Hindus have Sanskritized Bengali surnames. Many Bangladeshi Christians have Portuguese surnames. Buddhists have a mixture of Bengali and Tibeto-Burman surnames.

== See also ==
- Bangladeshi nationalism
- List of Bangladeshis
- Bangladeshi diaspora
- Demographics of Bangladesh
