= List of ziyarat locations =

This is a list of ziyarat locations from all around the world. Ziyarats are often shrines dedicated to various Muslim saints and Awliya but can also be places that are associated with them, like zawiyas.

== List ==
=== Afghanistan ===
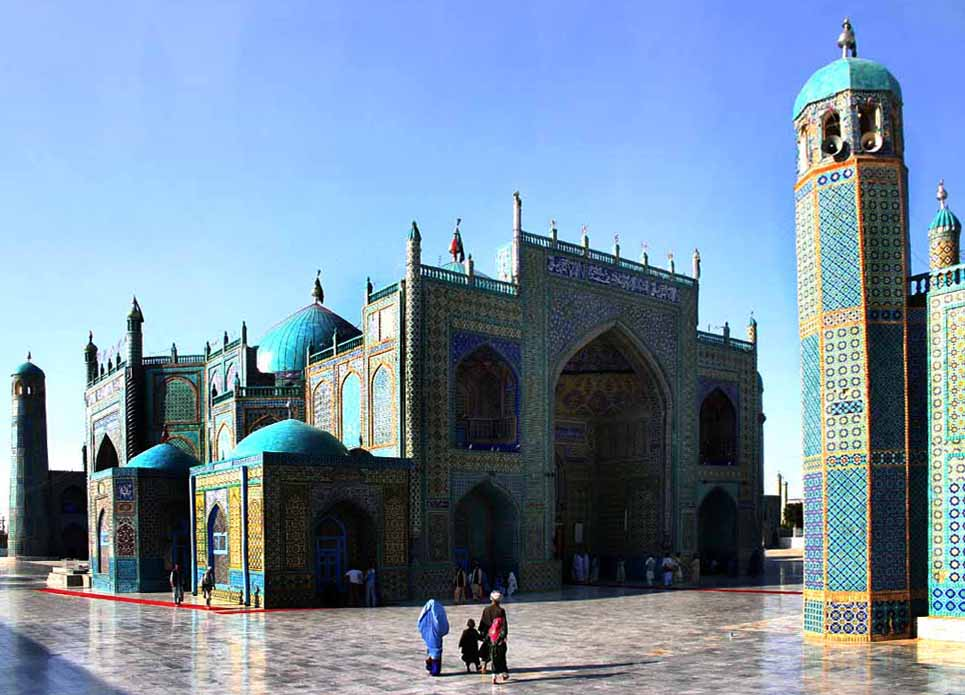
The Blue Mosque in Mazar-e-Sharif

- Khwaja 'Abd Allah Ansari shrine, Herat, Herat Province
- Kirka Sharif, believed to house the Cloak of Muhammad
- Shrine of Ali Karam Allah Wajho ("the Blue Mosque"), Mazar-i-Sharif, Balkh Province
- Khwaja Abu Nasr Parsa shrine, Balkh, Balkh Province
- Baba Hatim Ziyarat, Imam Sahib, Kunduz Province

=== Albania ===
- Tyrbja e Abaz Aliut
- List of Bektashi tekkes

=== Algeria ===
- Sidi Abou Median El Ghawth (Sidi Boumedienne), Tlemcen
- Sidi Mohamed ben Youssef Senoussi, Tlemcen
- Sidi Mohamed Belkaid, Tlemcen
- Sidi El Houari, Oran
- Sidi Ibrahim Tazi, Oran
- Chorfa M'haja, M'cid (near Sidi Bel Abbes)
- Sidi M'hamed Ben Ouda, Relizane
- Sidi M'hamed Ben Khadda, Relizane
- Sidi Ahmed Benyoucef El Meliani, Meliana
- Sidi Ahmed El Thaalibi, Algiers
- Sidi M'hamed Bouqobrine, Algiers
- Sidi Abdelkrim El Maghili, Zaouiat Kounta
- Sidi Mohamed Belkebir, Adrar
- Sidi Cheikh, El Bayadh
- Sidi Ahmed El Alaoui, Mostaganem

=== Azerbaijan ===
- Bibi-Heybat Mosque

=== Bangladesh ===
- Shah Amanat (Amānatullāh Khān) Dargah, Chattogram
- Shah Jalal Dargah, Sylhet
- Khan Jahan Ali Dargah, Bagerhat, Khulna

=== Bulgaria ===
- Demir Baba Teke
- Otman Baba’s Shrine

=== Canada ===
- Shah Mansoor Ali Ahmed Sabri, Toronto, Ontario

=== Comoros ===
- Shrine of Maoulida Hamadi
- Zaoui Mohamed Sheikh
- Sheikh Abdou Fadhul

=== Cyprus ===
- Hala Sultan Tekke or Mosque of Umm Haram (Larnaca)
- Mauláná Shaykh Muḥammad Nazım 'Adil al-Haqqani (Lefke)
- Kutup Turbesi (Polatpasa Bulvari, Gazimagusa 99450)
- Hazrat Omer Tomb

=== Egypt ===
- Malik Al-Ashtar Shrine, Cairo, Egypt
- Muhammad ibn Abi Bakr, Fustat, Cairo, Egypt
- Shrine of Hadhrat Amr Ibn Al-Aas
- Abu Abdullah Muhammad ibn Sa'id al-Busiri, Alexandria, Egypt
- Sidi Morsi Abu al-Abbas, Alexandria, Egypt
- Al Sheikh Ahmed Al Sakndari, Alexandria, Egypt
- Imam Abu Al Hassan El-Shadhili, Mara Alam, Egypt

=== India ===
==== Gujarat ====
- Hussain Tekri, Kanodar
- Shrine of Saiyed Murad Shahid Datar GANVADA
- Mazar e Qutbi, Ahemdabad
- Mazar e Saifee, Surat
- Shrine of Ibrahim, Bhadresar, Kutch district
- Shrine of Shah-e-Alam's Roza in Ahmedabad
- Shrine Sarkhej Roza of Ganj Ahmed Khattu in Sarkhej, Ahmedabad
- Qutub-e-Alam's Mosque in Vatwa, Ahmedabad
- Shrine of Sultan Ahmed Shah
- Shrine of Sultan Saiyad Sidi in Ahmedabad
- Shrine of Khwaja Jamaluddin Dana in Surat
- Shrine of Saiyad Ahmed Al Addrus in Bharuch
- Shrine of Baba Ghor near Jagadia
- Shrine of Baba Rustam shah near Tankaria
- Shrine of Pir Bukhari in Bhadiyad near Dholka
- Shrine of Haji Pir in Kutch
- Shrine of Shah Vajihuddin Alvi Husayni in Ahmedabad
- Saiyed Shah jalaluddin Chisty Nizami Hussaini, Savli, near Gothada, Vadodara
- Saiyed Aalad (Alauddin) Al Hussaini Zaidi Ul wasti, Savli, near Gothada, Vadodara
- Saiyed Mustufa Al Hussaini Zaidi Ul wasti, Thasra, Dist Kheda Gujarat
- Saiyed Nateeb Al Hussaini Zaidi Ul wasti, Pali, Dist Kheda Gujarat
- Shah Wajihuddin Alvi Gujarati Shattari Dargah Sharif, Ahmedabad
- Saiyed Peer Muhammad Shah Al Hussaini Ahmedabad Gujarat
- Saiyed Fakhruddin Rifai (Baroda)
- Shrine of Hadharat Saiyed Makhdoom Hasan Sharfuddin Mashhadi Al-Kazmi Al-Hussaini, Narmada River Bank,(Makhdoompur) Maktampur, Bharuch (Broach).

==== Delhi ====
- Qutbuddin Bakhtiar Kaki, Delhi
- Nizamuddin Auliya, Delhi
- Hazrat Syed Ruknuddin Firdausi, Maharani Bagh, Delhi
- Hazrat Syed Najibuddin Firdausi, Mehrauli, Delhi
- Nasiruddin Chiragh Dehlavi, Delhi
- Syed Qutabuddin Dehlvi son of Fakharuddin Dehlvi
- Shah Nasiruddin Kaly Mian son of Syed Qutabuddin Dehlvi
- Syed Abdul Haq Muhaddis Dehlavi Mehrauli Delhi

==== Uttar Pradesh ====
- Shrine of Mujaddid Ahmed Raza Khan
- Syed Jamal Shah Khurmy waly, Moradabad
- Shah Ahmad Shah pir je sarkar, Rampur, Moradabad
- Syed Chishti Miyan, Moradabad
- Imam Ahmad Raza Khan [Ala Hazrat], Baraili Sharif, Uttar Pradesh
- Huzoor Shere Sunnat [Hashmat Ali Khan], Pilibhit, Uttar Pradesh
- Sayed Salar Masood e Gazi, Bahraich Shareef
- Sayed Zinda Shah Madar, Kanpur Shareef
- Mushahid Raza Hasmati, Pilibhit Shareef
- Masoom ur Raza Hasmati
- Syed Riyaz Ahmad Naqshbandi's Shrine in Fatehpur, Uttar Pradesh
- Waris Ali Shah Dargah, Dewa, Barabanki district
- Sultan Syed Ashraf Jahangir Semnani Dargah, Ashrafpur Kichhauchha
- Syed Mohammed Mukhtar Ashraf Dargah, Ashrafpur Kichhauchha
- Syed Shahwilayat Naqvi Dargah, Amroha

==== Jammu & Kashmir ====
- Charari Sharief, Budgam district
- Dastgeer Sahib, Khanyar, Srinagar district
- Hazratbal Shrine, Hazratbal, Srinagar district
- Khanqah-e-Moula, Srinagar, Srinagar district
- Ziyarat Naqshband Sahab, Khanyar, Srinagar district
- Dargah Aaliyah Owaisiah Kashira Kupwara
- Hazrat alhaaj Qutub ul Aqtaab Moulana Muhammad Amin Owaisi, Kashira Kupwara
- Tomb of Shams-ud-Din Araqi, Chadoora, Budgam district
- Aga Sahib Shrine, Budgam
- Aga Mir Syed Mohammad Baqir Mosavi, Wahabpora, Budgam district
- Hazrat Mir Syed Haji Mohammad Murad Bukhari Qazi Kashmir, Kreeri, Baramulla district
- Hamzah Makhdoom, Srinagar, Kashmir
- Baba Naseeb-ud-Din Ghazi (Bijbeharah)
- Syed Ali Allauddin (khansahib) Ravi Al-Bukhari chewdara, beerwah, Kashmir
- Hazrat Muhammad Shah(RA) village Anzwalla, tehsil and district Islamabad (Anantnag) Kashmir
- Mir Syed Hussain Simnani (RA) (Kulgam)

==== Kerala ====
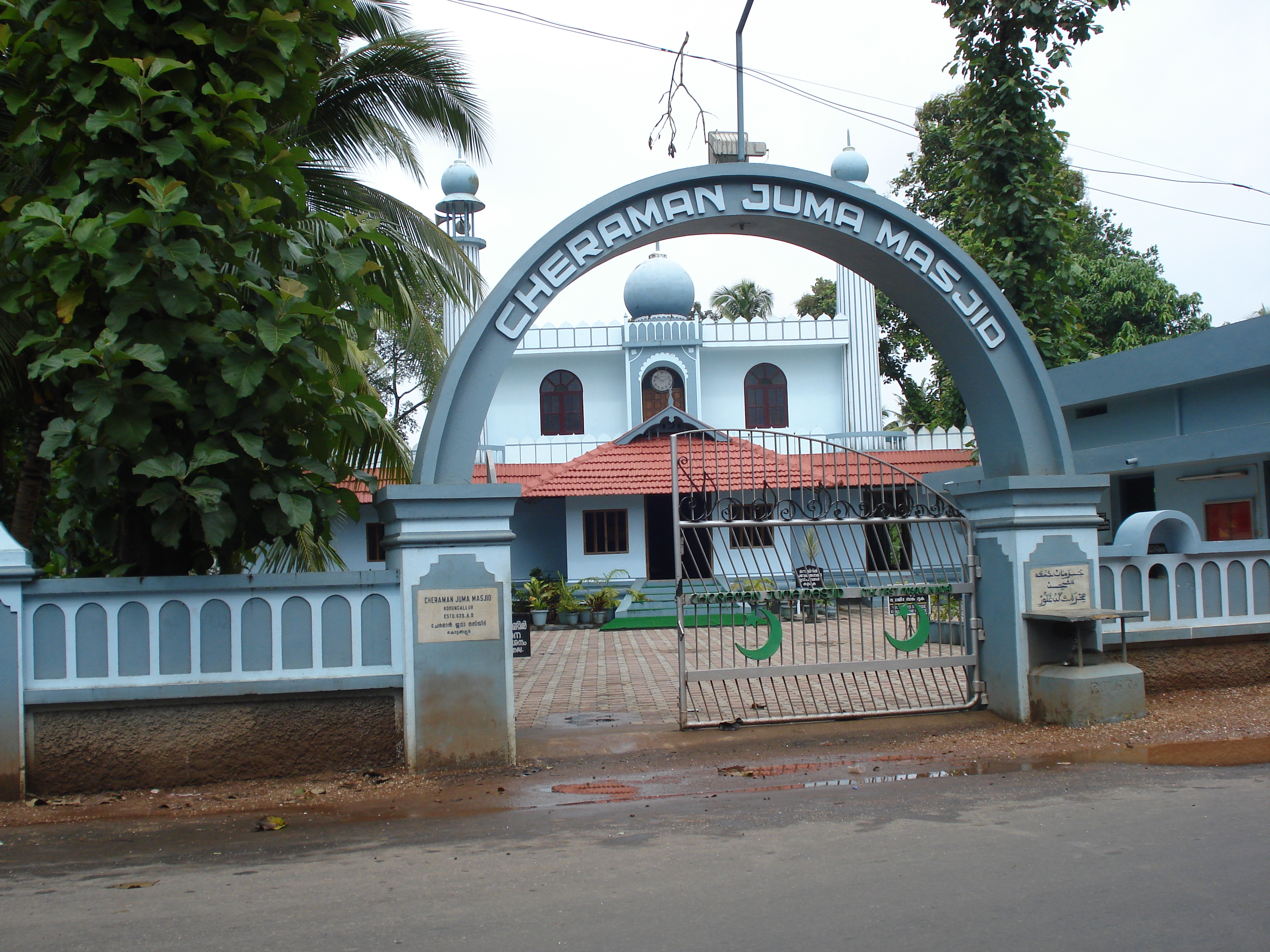
Cheraman Juma Mosque

- Cheraman Juma Mosque, Methala, Kodungallur Taluk, Thrissur district
- Malik Dinar Mosque (Malik Deenar Grand Juma Masjid), Thalangara, Kasaragod district
- Madavoor CM Maqam, Madavoor, Kozhikode district, Kerala
- Mamburam Thangal Maqam (Malappuram), Chemmad, Malappuram district
- Veliyankod Umar Khazi Maqam (Veliyankod), Veliyankod, Malappuram district
- Zainudeen Makhdoom RA Maqam (Ponnani), Ponnani, Malappuram district
- Beema Palli Maqam (Poonthura), Trivandrum, Trivandrum district
- Kochu Thangal RA Maqam (Kollam Pallimukku), Kollam district
- Kunju Muhiyadheen Shah Ra Maqam (Kollam Pallimuck), Kollam district

==== Maharashtra ====
- Valley of Saints (shrines of several Sufi saints and the Mughal emperor Aurangzeb), Khuldabad, Aurangabad district
- Moulaya Najam Khan, Aurangabad
- Raudat Tahera, Mumbai
- Hazrat Syed Fazle Mohammad Almaroof Pappal Shah Baba Chisti RA Umred Nagpur
- Mufti e Aazam Maharashtra Mufti Mohammad Mujeeb Ashraf Razvi ul Qadri Sahab Qibla Alahirrehma, Nagpur

==== Rajasthan ====
- Ajmer Sharif Dargah (shrine to Moinuddin Chishti), Ajmer, Ajmer district
- Mazar-E-Fakhri (shrine to Syedi Fakhruddin), Galiakot, Dungarpur district

==== Tamil Nadu ====
- Sambaipatinam, Jamaliya Assyed Muhammed Moulana Al Hasaniul Hashimi Nayagam Jamaliya Moulana Darga — Sambaipatinam, Peravurani Taluk, Tanjavur district
- Tirumullaivasal, Jamaliya Syed Yaseen Moulana Al Hasaniul Hashimi Nayagam Darga — Tirumullaivasal, Sirkali Taluk, Nagapattinam district

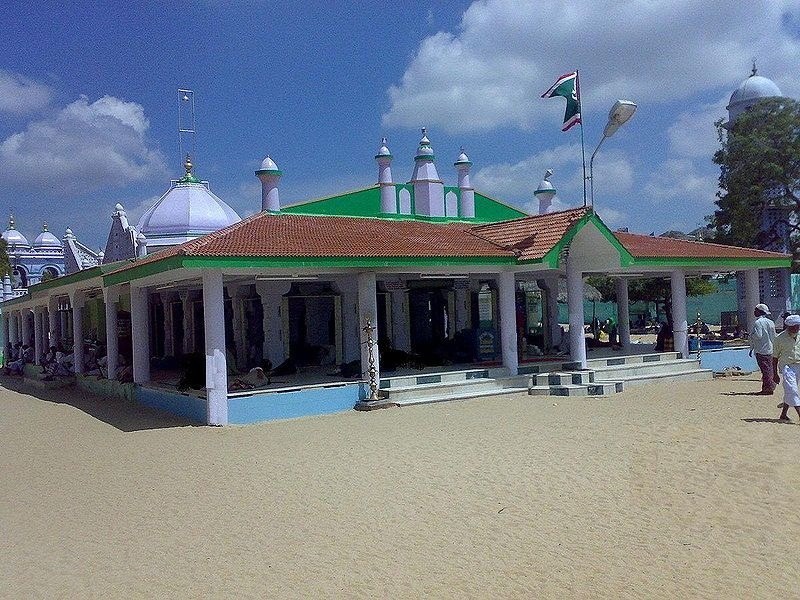
Ervadi dargah, the tomb of Sultan Syed Ibrahim Shaheed Badusha

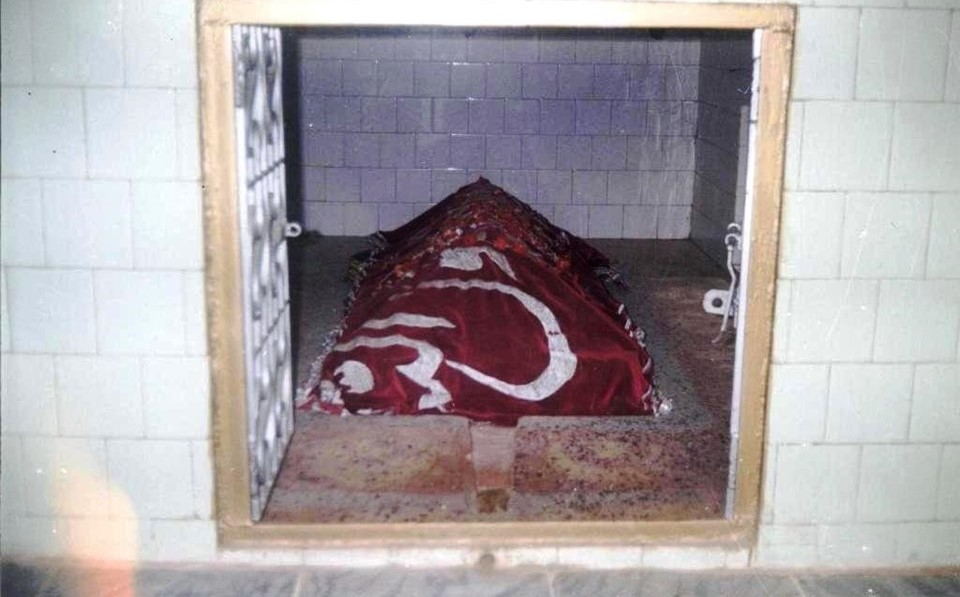
Syed Riyaz Ahmad Naqshbandi's Shrine in Fatehpur

- Sultan Syed Ibrahim Shaheed Badusha Dargah, Erwadi, Ramanathapuram district
- Thiruparankundram Dargah (Sultan Sikandar Badushah Shaheed shrine), Thiruparankundram, Madurai district
- Nagore Shahul Hamid Badusha Dargah, Nagore, Nagapattinam district
- Madurai Maqbara (dargah of Mir Ahmad Ibrahim, Mir Amjad Ibrahim, and Abdus Salam Ibrahim), Madurai, Madurai district
- Hazrath Badaruddin Shaheed RA — Zamin Pallavarram, Hazrat Tamim al-Ansari RA — Kovalam, Hazrath Syed Moosa Sha Qadri R.A - Mount Road, Hazrath Dastagir Saheb — Mount Road, Chennai

==== Punjab ====
- Tomb of Ameer Ali Shah (Sri Muktsar Sahib)
- Shrine Baba Khaki Shah Sattar (Dera Baba Khaki Shah Malang Kattu, Bhathlan)
- Shrine Baba Bharpoor Shah Sattar (Peerkhana Jassara)
- Shrine Baba Waryam Shah Sattar (Pind Maida Zila Fatehgarh Saheb ji)
- Shrine Dera Baba Murad Shah Ji (Amardas colony, Nakodar)
- Shrine Roza Sharif Mandhali Darbar (Mandhali, Phagwara)

==== Madhya Pradesh ====
- Hazrat Peer e Yazdani (R.A), Khilchipur Sharif, District Biyavrah Rajgarh
- Khirala Sharif Dargah Khirala, Khandwa district
- Mazar e Najmi, Ujjain
- Dargah e Hakimi (shrine of Syedi Abdul Qadir Hakimuddin), Burhanpur

=== Indonesia ===
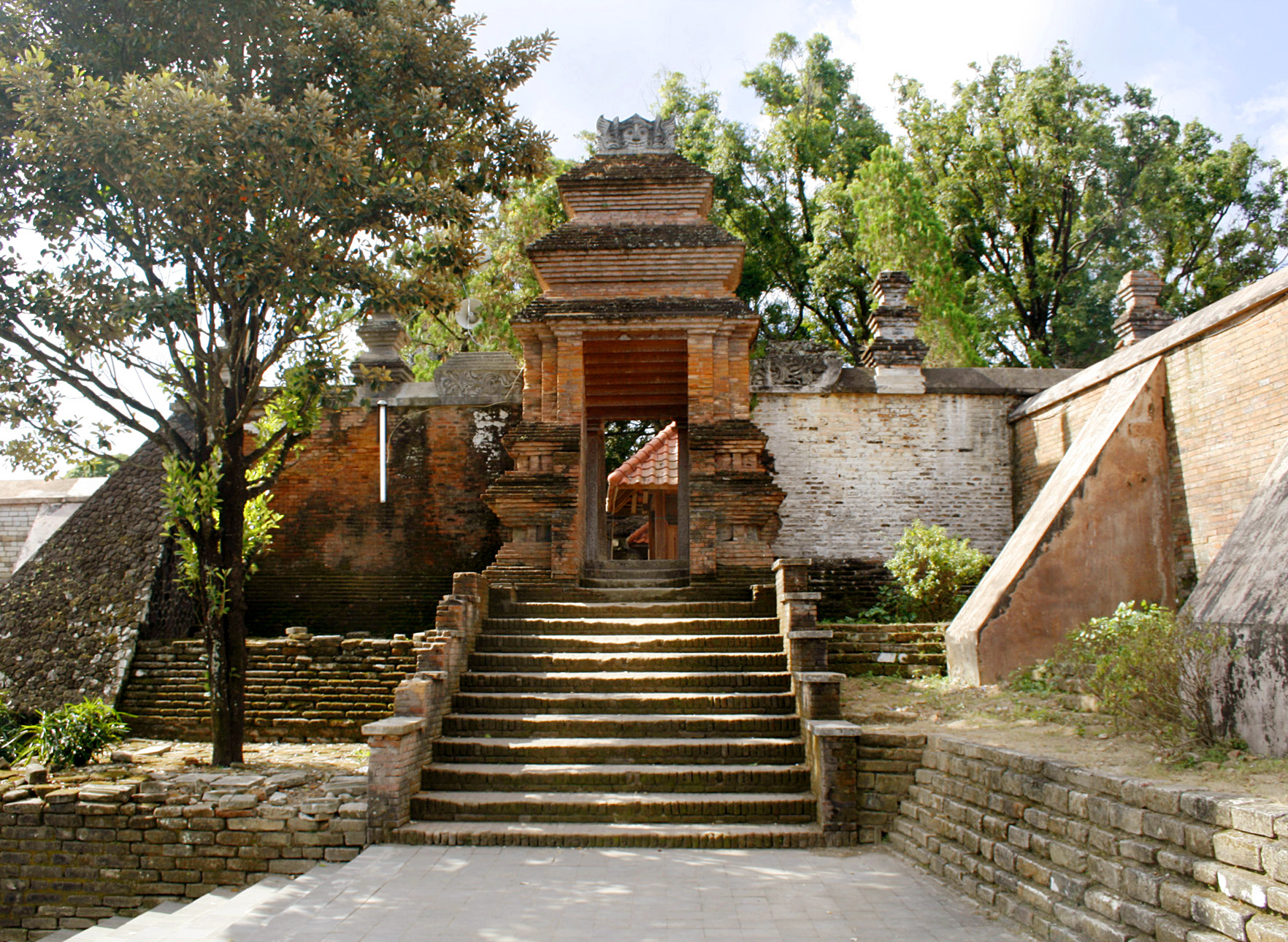
The gateway to the mosque and mausoleum complex of Kotagede

Many Indonesians visit the royal Javanese graves, or the cemeteries of former presidents and Muslim missionaries. These include:

- Wali Sanga whose tombs spread across Java
- Astana Giribangun which houses the tombs of the family of Suharto, former President of Indonesia
- Giriloyo, royal cemetery for relatives of Sultan Agung of Mataram
- Imogiri, a cemetery complex where the rulers of the Mataram Sultanate and also the Yogyakarta Sultanate are buried.
- Kotagede, which contains a religious complex consisting of a mosque and a royal cemetery where the rulers of the Mataram Sultanate are buried.
- Makam Keramat Tujuh, which contains the tombs of several missionaries which date back to at least the 15th century
- Makam Papan Tinggi, which contains the tomb of an early Tabi' and Muslim religious cleric

=== Iran ===
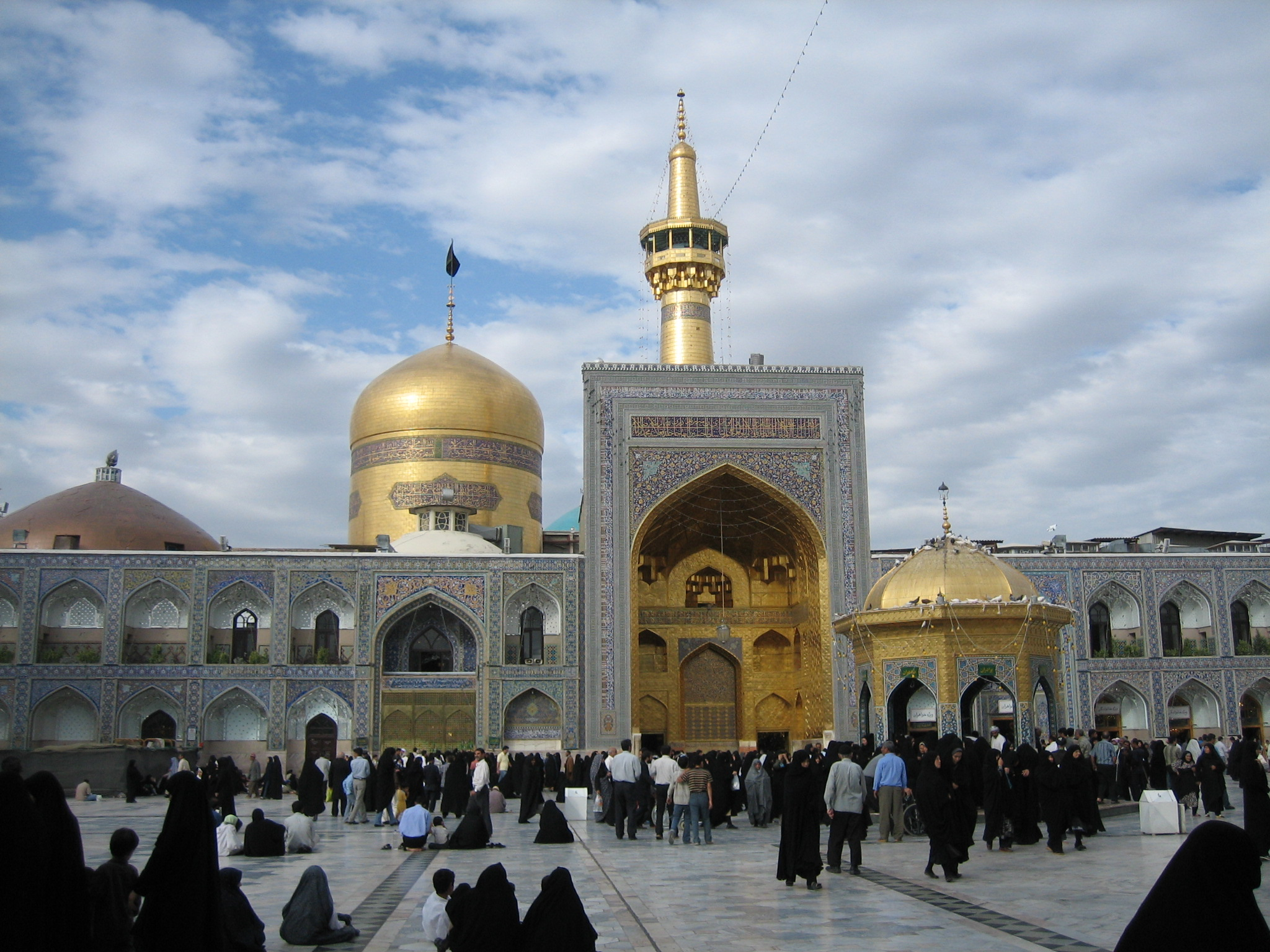
Imam Reza shrine, tomb of Ali al-Ridha (Eight Shia Twelver Imam)

Iran's Cultural Heritage Organization lists several hundred "ziyarat-gah" or places of pilgrimage in which an Imamzadeh, or Imam is buried in Iran. Some of the more popular ones include:

- Fatima Masumeh Shrine, Qom. Tomb of Fātimah bint Mūsā (sister of the eight Twelver Shia Imam Ali al-Ridha and the daughter of the seventh Shia Imam Musa al-Kadhim) and three daughters of the ninth Shia Twelver Imam, Muhammad al-Jawad.
- Jamkaran, Qom
- Imam Reza shrine – a large complex, developed on the burial site of the Eighth Shī`a Imām, 'Ali ar-Ridha, Mashhad
- Shah-Abdol-Azim shrine. Tomb of: 'Abdul 'Adhīm ibn 'Abdillāh al-Hasanī (aka. Shah Abdol Azim, a fifth generation descendant of Hasan ibn 'Alī and a companion of the ninth Shī'ah Twelver Imām, Muhammad al-Jawad). Adjacent to the shrine, within the complex, are the mausolea of Imamzadeh Tahir (son of the fourth Shī'ah Twelver Imām Ali ibn Husayn Zayn al-Abidin), and Imamzadeh Hamzeh (brother of the eighth Shī'ah Twelver Imām Ali al-Ridha).
- Imamzadeh Saleh, Shemiran. Tomb of Sāleh (son of the seventh Shī'ah Twelver Imām Musa al-Kadhim).

=== Iraq ===
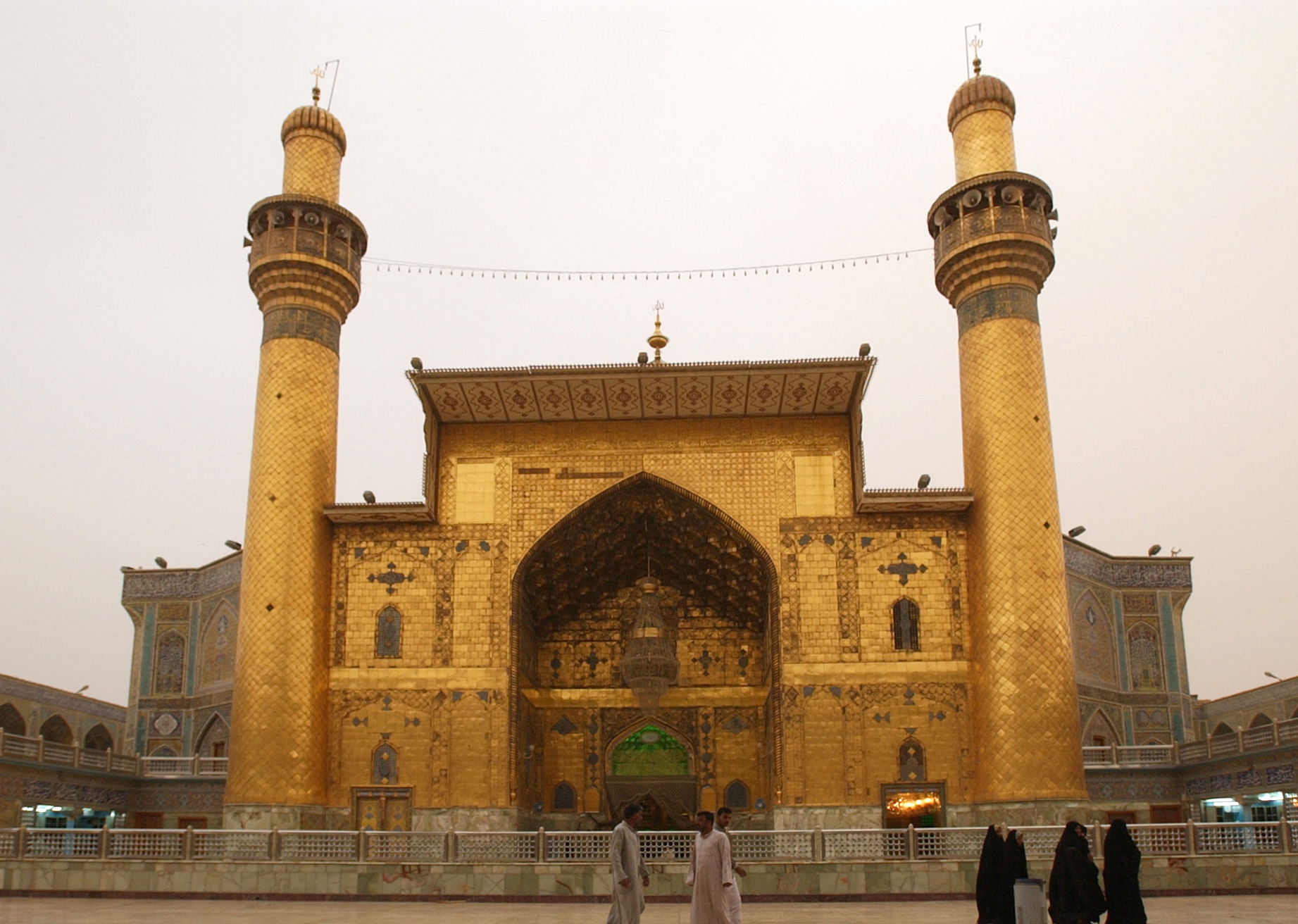
Mosque of Ali in Najaf

- Imām 'Alī Mosque in Najaf. Tomb of 'Alī ibn Abī Tālib (First Shī'ah Imām – Fourth Sunni Caliph), Adam (Shī'ah belief), Noah (Shī'ah belief).
- Imām Husayn Mosque in Karbala. Tomb of Husayn ibn 'Alī (Third Shī'ah Imām), 'Ali Akbar ibn Husayn, 'Ali Asghar ibn Husayn, Habīb ibn Madhāhir, all the martyrs of Karbalā, Ibrāhīm ibn Mūsā al-Kādhim.
- Al 'Abbās Mosque in Karbala. Tomb of 'Abbās ibn `Alī.
- Al Kādhimiya Mosque in Kadhimayn. Tomb of Seventh Twelver Shī'ah Imām, Mūsā al-Kādhim; Ninth Twelver Shī'ah Imām, Muhammad at-Taqī; Shaykh Mufīd; Shaykh Tūsī.
- Al 'Askarī Mosque in Samarra. Tomb of Tenth Twelver Shī'ah Imām, 'Alī an-Naqī; Eleventh Twelver Shī'ah Imām, Hasan al-'Askarī; Hakimah Khātūn; Narjis Khātūn
- Abu Hanifa Mosque. Tomb of Abū Ḥanīfa (founder of the Sunni Hanafi school of Islamic jurisprudence.)
- Tomb of Ezekiel, Al-Nukhaliah Mosque, Al Kifl, Babil Governorate
- Rabia of Basra, buried in Basra, Iraq

=== Palestine ===
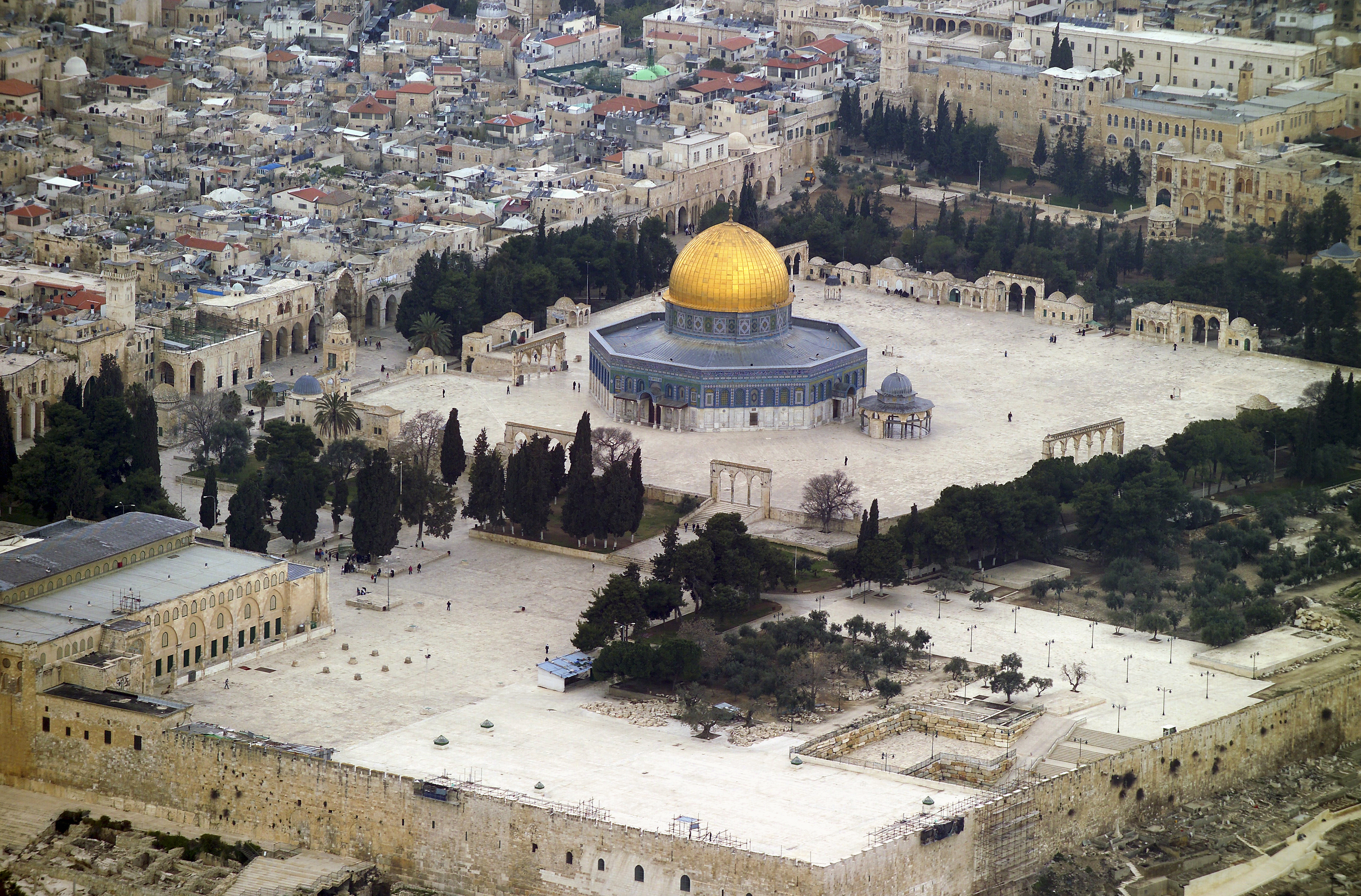
Masjid al-Aqsa

- Masjid Al Aqsa, built over the spot where the Islamic prophet Muhammad is said to have prayed before he ascended to the heavens; Jerusalem
- Masjid Sakhra (Dome of the Rock), built over the rock from whence legend holds Muhammad is to have ascended to the heavens; Jerusalem
- Tomb of Moses, 16 km (10 mi) from Jerusalem
- Cave of the Patriarchs, Hebron
- Joseph's Tomb, outside Nablus
- Tomb of Lot, Bani Na'im
- Tomb of Tamim al-Dari, Bayt Jibrin
- Sayed al-Hashim Mosque — Muhammad's great-grandfather, Gaza
- Tomb of Samuel, Nabi Samwil
- Sidna Ali Mosque, Herzliya — Tomb of Ibn Aleem who was a Muslim saint that fell during the Battle of Arsuf
- Nabi Rubin Mosque, Palmachim — the Muslim traditional burial site of Reuben. The shrine is abandoned.
- Nabi Yahya Mosque, Sebastia — tomb of John the Baptist
- Nebi Akasha Mosque, Jerusalem — tomb of Ukasha ibn al-Mihsan, a friend of Muhammad and also a burial place for some Muslim saints from Saladin's army. The shrine is abandoned. See also Expedition of Ukasha bin Al-Mihsan (Udhrah and Baliy).
- Tomb of Joshua (Shia Islam), Ramot Naftali – Shiite shrine of Yusha's (Joshua) tomb. The village which includes the shrine was Shiite and destroyed in 1948. The shrine is abandoned.
- Nabi Bulus, Beit Shemesh — the shrine of Paul the Apostle in the Muslim tradition (unlike the Christian one which is in Rome). The shrine is abandoned.
- Maqam Shihab al-Din, Nazareth — a small shrine and mosque on a rooftop and the burial place of Shihab al-Din, Saladin's nephew who died at the Battle of Hattin near Tiberias. Located in front of the Basilica of the Annunciation.
- Mosque of Omar, Jerusalem — in front of the Church of the Holy Sepulchre, Omar prayed there after refusing to pray inside the church, it is also believed to be the place where David prayed.
- Jubb Yussef (Joseph's Well) — the well that Joseph was thrown in. Abandoned shrine.
- Tomb of Nabi Saleh, Ramla — Saleh mentioned seven times in the Quran as the prophet who told Mada'in Saleh residents to convert their religion to Islam, after they did not listen to him the city was destroyed by God. His tomb is locked near the White Mosque in Ramla, which is the largest remains of an early Islamic mosque in Israel; every spring, an annual pilgrimage celebration is held at the shrine.
- Maqam al-Nabi Shu'ayb, Horns of Hattin — Ziyarat al-Nabi Shu'ayb is the biggest Druze Ziyarat
- Maqam al-Nabi Sabalan, Hurfeish

=== Jordan ===
- An-Nabi Yusha' bin Noon (Joshua bin Nun), near the city of Al-Salt in Jordan – shrine of Yusha' (Joshua)
- Jafar e Tayyar, brother of Ali Ibn Abi Talib, companion of Prophet Muhammad, in Al-Mazar, Jordan

=== Kazakhstan ===
- Aisha Bibi
- Mausoleum of Khoja Akhmet Yassawi, Turkistan

=== Kosovo ===
- Tomb of Murad I, Pristina
- Mausoleum of Sheh Sulejman Axhiza Baba, Prizren
- Tekke of Baba Ali, Gjakova
- Mausoleum of Sarı Saltık, Peja
- Mausoleum of Xhylfahatun, Peja

=== Kyrgyzstan ===
- Safed-Bulan
- Sulayman-Too

=== Lebanon ===
- Maqam Shamoun Al Safa
- Prophet Sari Shrine
- Tomb of Prophet Siddiq

=== Malaysia ===
Makam Sultan Al-Ariffin, Pulau Besar, Melaka. Makam Tokku Paloh, Kampung Paloh, Terengganu

=== Mozambique ===
- Dargah of Sheikh Sayed Pir Abdul Rahman R.A (Santuario Piri) — Nova Sofala, Mozambique

=== Morocco ===
- Imam al Jazuli — Marrakesh
- Qadi 'Iyad al Maliki — Marrakesh
- Zawiya Moulay Idris — Fes
- Zawiya Shaykh Ahmad Tijani — Fes
- Seven Saints of Marrakech — Marrakesh
- Syed Abdul Aziz Dabbagh, Ghaus ul Waqt
- Abd as-Salam ibn Mashish al-Alami — Moulay Abdeslam

=== Pakistan ===
- Lahore: Bibi Pak Daman, daughter of Hazrat Ali (as) and sister of Hazrat Abbas ibn Ali (as) and her 3 daughters (granddaughters of Imam Ali (as)
- Hazrat Pir Syed Ghulam Haider Ali Shah (Jalalpur Sharif, Jhelum, Pakistan)
- Moulana Ash'Shaikh Muhammad Khan Hanafi Qadri Naqshbandi (1920–1980), Jaranwala Road, Faisalabad
- Syedi wa Moulaya Bhaijee Bhai Saheb, Chand Bibi Road, Ranchore Lane, Karachi, Pakistan.
- Syed Sajjad Ali Chishti Nizami Sabri Qadri Moradabadi, Railway Headquarters, Lahore, Punjab.
- Hazrat Pir Muhammad Inayat Ahmad Naqshbandi RH, Ganj e Inayat Sarkar Kabootar Pura
- Mian Abdul Sattar Chishti Nizami almaroof Baba Sabeel Shah Oliya, Railway Headquarters, Lahore, Punjab
- Darbar Bibi Pak Daman, Lahore, Punjab
- Darbar Hazrat Baba Fareed Ganjshakar Pakpattan Shareef, Punjab
- Shrine of Shah Abdul Latif Bhittai, Bhit, Sindh
- Shrine of Lal Shahbaz Qalandar, Sehwan Sharif, Jamshoro District, Sindh
- Shrine of Sultan ul Arifeen Hazrat Syed Rakhyal Shah Sufi AL Qadri at Dargah Fateh Pur Sharif, Gandawah, Balochistan, Pakistan
- Shrine of Murshid Nadir Ali Shah, Sehwan Sharif, Jamshoro District, Sindh
- Sachal Sarmast Daraza, District Khairpur, Sindh
- Syed Baba Mureed Ali Shah Mehrabpur District Naushahro Froze, Sindh
- Pir Juman Shah Qurashi Padidan Naushahro Froze, Sindh
- Pir Shaikh Ahmed Kabir Qurashi Padidan District Naushahro Froze, Sindh
- Syed Ibrahim Shah near Bhira Road District Naushahro Froze, Sindh
- Pir Wanhiyal District Naushahro Froze, Sindh
- Abdullah Shah Gazi, Karachi, Sindh
- Shah Shams Sabzwari, Multan, Pakistan
- Dargah of Syed Ali Miran Al Naqvi Bhakkari, Mona Syedan, Punjab
- Shrine of Usman bin Ali al Ghaznavi alias Data Ganj Bakhsh Ali Hajveri, Lahore, Punjab
- Shrine of Bulleh Shah (Abdullah), Kasur, Punjab
- Shrine of Pir Syed Meher Ali Shah, Golra Sharif, Golra, Islamabad.
- Shrine of Pir Muhammad Qasim Sadiq Mohrvi from Mohra Sharif, Rawalpindi, Punjab, Pakistan
- Shrine of Pir Gul Badshah from Mohra Sharif, Rawalpindi, Punjab, Pakistan
- Peer Pathan (Tonsa Sharif), Punjab, Pakistan, Dera Ghazi Khan
- Shrine of Pir Hadi Hassan Bux Shah Jilani, Duthro Sharif, Sanghar, Sindh
- Shrine of Sayed Amir Shams Baba Parachinar Kurram District KPK
- Shrine & Darbar of Syed Jalaluddin Surkh-Posh Bukhari (Uch Sharif)
- Darbar of Hazrat Nausha Ganj Bakhsh Qadri (RA), Mandi Bahauddin, Punjab
- Hazrat Khwaja Ghulam Mohiuddin Gaznavi (RA) and Shaykh ul Alam, Pir Muhammad Alauddin Siddiqui (RA), [Nerian Sharif, Azad Kashmir, Pakistan]
- Darbar of Hazrat Shah Mashwani (RA), KPK
- Hazrat Mian Meer Sarkar Al-Farooqi R.A
- Shrine & Darbar of Peer Bahaar Shah, Sheikhupura
- Shah Mian Awliya R.A, Kohat, KP

=== Azad Kashmir ===
- Shrine of Pir Ghulam Mohiudin Ghaznavi (great Sufi of Naqshbandi Order) at Nerian Sharif, Azad Kashmir, Pakistan
- Shrine of Pir Alauddin Siddiqui, Nerian Sharif, Azad Kashmir, Pakistan. He was the founder of Mohi-ud-Din Islamic University and Medical College.
- Shrine of Pir Syed Said Ali Shah Gardazi, Sohawi Great Sufi from Silsila e Chishti, Sohawa Sharif Tehsil Dhirkot, Bagh Azad Jammu and Kashmir.

=== Russia ===
==== Bashkortostan ====
- Chishmy, Chishminsky where an early Muslim ruler is buried
- Starobairamgulovo, Uchalinsky District where two awliya are buried

=== Saudi Arabia ===
- Al-Masjid an-Nabawi, Medina
- Maqbaratu l-Baqī' in Medina where Fatima bint Muhammad, Hasan ibn Ali, Ali ibn al-Husayn Zayn al-'Abidin, Muhammad al-Baqir, and Ja'far al-Sadiq are buried
- Badr Shohada Graveyard at Badr close to Masjid Al Areesh
- Jabl Al Malaika (Mountain Where Angels Descended) at Badr (RQ67+PV9, Badr 46353, Saudi Arabia)
- Jannatul Mualla, Makkah — graves of: Abd Manaf ibn Qusai, Hashim ibn 'Abd Manaf, Abdul Mutallib, and Abu Talib ibn 'Abd al-Muttalib, among others
- Mount Uhud, the site of the Battle of Uhud, Medina
- Hira, the cave where the angel Gabriel first visited Muhammad, Mecca
- Thawr, the cave where Muhammad and his companion Abu Bakr took refuge in the first few days of the Hijrah (migration) from Mecca to Medina
- Quba Mosque, Medina
- Masjid al-Qiblatain, Medina

=== North West Province ===
- Mazaar of Hazrat Chote Bawa Saheb, Zeerust
- Mazaar of Hazrat Hajee Ghulam Mustafa Bawa, Zeerust

=== Gauteng Province ===
- Mazaar of Hazrat Qamar Ali Shah Khaki, Avalon cemetery
- Mazaar of Hazrat Sheikh Yusuf Sufiyaan, Braamfontein cemetery
- Mazaar of Hazrat Jabileel Jaffer and Khalifa Ismail Kasoodjee, Braamfontein cemetery
- Mazaar of Moulana Molvi Sayed Tajuhhul Hoosein, Braamfontein cemetery
- Qabr of Marhooma Fatima Amalanee, Braamfontein cemetery
- Qabr of Marhooma Jogee Matee, Braamfontein cemetery
- Mazaar of Hazrat Shah Ghulam Muhammad Jummal Al-Qadiri, Newclare cemetery
- Mazaar of Hazrath Maulana Fazle Ahmed Naqshbandi, Newclare cemetery
- Dargah of Hazrat Abdul Rahman Fazl-e-Elahi Naqshbandi, Benoni
- Mazaar of Hazrat Khwaja Sayed Muhammad Khalid Shah Chishti Sabiri Jahangiri Kambal Posh (Hazrat Khalid Shah Bawa), Benoni
- Dargah of Hazrat Goolam Hoosein Fazl-e-Elahi, Boksburg
- Mazaar of Hazrat Goolam Mohammed Shah (Imam Bapu Bare Mia), Standerton

=== KwaZulu-Natal Province ===
- Mazaar of Hazrat Hajee Shah Goolam Mohamed Soofie Siddique Chisti Al-Qadiri Habibi (Hazrat Soofie Saheb), Durban
- Mazaar of Hazrat Sheikh Sayed Ahmad Badshah Peer Al-Qadiri, Durban
- Qabr of Hazrat Fateh Bawa, Durban
- Mazaar of Hazrat Goolam Rasool Bawa, Verulam
- Mazaar of Hazrat Sheikh Sayed Hussain Raja Bawa, Mayville Qabristan
- Mazaar of Hazrat Cassim Bawa and others, Mayville Qabristan
- Mazaar of Hazrat Soofie Sayed Mohamed Abed Mia Osmani, Ladysmith
- Mazaar of Hazrat Mohammed Ismail Cassim Pochee Qadiri Sabiri (Hazrat Pochee Bawa), Charlestown
- Mazaar of Hazrat Hajee Abdus Sattar, Estcourt
- Mazaar of Hazrat Sayyah Bawa, Clarendon, Pietermaritzburg
- Mazaar of Hazrat Qaasim Bawa, Clarendon, Pietermaritzburg
- Mazaar of Hazrat Shah Abdul Rahman Chishti, Mountain Rise Qabristan, Pietermaritzburg

=== Northern Cape Province ===
- Kramat of Imam Al Saed Imam Abu Bakr Saqqaf, Kimberley

=== Eastern Cape Province ===
- Kramat of Tuan Imam Haji Abu Rafi and others, Gqeberha

=== Western Cape Province ===
- Mazaar of Moulana Abdul Latief Qadi Siddique, Rylands
- Qabr of Sheikh Yusuf Parker, Rylands
- Kramat of Shaykh Hazrat Khwaja Sayed Ali Shah, Maitland cemetery
- Qabr of Shaykh Yusuf Da Costa, Maitland cemetery
- Kramat of Sheikh Sayed Ali, Camps Bay
- Kramat of Tuan Sayed Ja'far, Camps Bay
- Kramat of Sheikh Muhammad Zaid, Camps Bay
- Kramat of Sayed Mahdi, Camps Bay
- Kramat of Sayed Ihsaan and many others, Camps Bay
- Kramat of Sheikh Sayed Noorul Mubeen, Oudekraal
- Kramat of Sheikh Isa and many others, Oudekraal
- Kramat of Hazrat Sahebji Bawa and others, Camps Bay
- Kramat of Sheikh Ali Sayed Bassier, Camps Bay
- Kramat of Sayed Umar and others, Camps Bay
- Kramat of Sheikh Sayed Muhammad Hassan Al-Qadiri (Ghaibie Shah), Signal Hill
- Kramat of Sitti Maryam, Signal Hill
- Kramat of Sitti Khadijah, Signal Hill
- Kramat of Tuan Nur Ghiri Bawa (Tuan Ghalieb), Signal Hill
- Kramat of Tuan Sayed Sulaiman, Signal Hill
- Kramat of Tuan Sayed Osman, Signal Hill
- Kramat of Sayed Abdul Mutalib and many others, Signal Hill
- Kramat of Tuan Kaape-Ti-Low (Jawhi Tuan), Appleton Scout Campsite, Signal Hill
- Kramat of Imam Abdullah ibn Qadi Abdus Salaam (Tuan Guru), Tana Baru Cemetery, Bo-Kaap
- Kramat of Tuan Sayed Alawi, Tana Baru Cemetery, Bo-Kaap
- Kramat of Tuan Nuruman, Tana Baru Cemetery, Bo-Kaap
- Kramat of Sheikh Abubakr Effendi, Tana Baru Cemetery, Bo-Kaap
- Qabr of Ahmad Van Bengal, Tana Baru Cemetery, Bo-Kaap
- Qabr of Raban Ibn Mawlana Omar, Tana Baru Cemetery, Bo-Kaap
- Qabr of Saartjie van die Kaap, Tana Baru Cemetery, Bo-Kaap
- Qabr of Samida van die Kaap, Tana Baru Cemetery, Bo-Kaap
- Qabr of Ibn Amaldien, Tana Baru Cemetery, Bo-Kaap
- Qabr of Hadjie Imam Gasanodien and many others, Tana Baru Cemetery, Bo-Kaap
- Kramat of Sayed Abdul Malik, Deer Park, Vredehoek
- Kramat of Sheikh Sayed Abdul Haq Al-Qadiri, Vredehoek
- Kramat of Sayed Jabaar, Vredehoek
- Kramat of Sayed Muhammad Haq Al-Qadiri, Vredehoek
- Kramat of Sayed Muhammad, Vredehoek
- Kramat of Sayed Muhammad Ilahi, Vredehoek
- Kramat of Sayed Yahya Johor and many others, Vredehoek
- Kramat of Sheikh Abdul Kader Bismillah Shah Bawa, Devil's Peak
- Qabr Sheikh Muhammad Salie and many others, Devil's Peak
- Kramat of Tuan Jaliel Dea Koasa, Simon's Town
- Kramat of Tuan Ismail Dea Malela, Simon's Town
- Kramat of Imam Abdul Karim and others, Seaforth cemetery, Simon's Town
- Cave and Kramat of Sayyiduna Abdul Qadir Jilani Dea Koasa (Antonies Gat), Cape Point
- Kramat of Sayed Abdul Aziz, Muizenburg
- Kramat of Sultan Shaheed Omar Stawaan, Kommetjie
- Kramat of Sitti Khadijah and others, Kommetjie
- Waldorf Muslim memorial, Waldorf Primary School, Constantia
- Kramat of Sheikh Sayed Mahmud Al-Qadiri, Constantia
- Kramat of Sayed Ibrahim and many others, Constantia
- Kramat of Sheikh Abdurahman Matebe Shah, Constantia
- Kramat of Abdul Qadir, Constantia
- Kramat of Abu Bakr, Constantia
- Kramat of Sitti Khadijah, Constantia
- Kramat of Sitti A'ishah, Constantia
- Kramat of Sitti Fatima, Constantia
- Kramat of Sheikh Sayed Abdul Mutalib Al-Shattari, Buitenverwachting Farm, Constantia
- Kramat of Sheikh Haalim, Buitenverwachting Farm, Constantia
- Kramat of Sheikh Ismail and many others, Buitenverwachting Farm, Constantia
- Kramat of Sayed Abdurahman Motura, Robben Island
- Qabr of Sayed Bien Yamien, Robben Island
- Kramat Sayed Muhsin Bin Alawi Al-Aydarus, Mowbray
- Kramat of Abdurrahim Al Iraqi, Mowbray Maqbara
- Kramat of Sheikh Yusuf Al Makassari and many others, Macassar
- Kramat of Sheikh Tuan Sulayman Masud and others (Tuan Masud), Worcester
- Kramat of Tuan Sayyid Nassier and others, Worcester
- (not open to the public) Kramat of Sayyid Yahya and others, near Brandvlei dam and prison
- Kramat of Sayed Abdul Kader and others, Caledon
- Kramat of Sheikh Suleiman and others, Bainskloof
- Kramat of Sheikh Sayed Abdurahmaan Al-Mujahiddin, Mossel Bay
- Kramat of Sheikh Sayed Ahmad Singosari Al-Shattari, Jonkershoek Nature Reserve in Stellenbosch
- Kramat of Sittina Shahidah Sayyidah Sadiyah, Jonkershoek Nature Reserve in Stellenbosch
- Kramat of Sayed Ahmit and many others, Jonkershoek Nature Reserve in Stellenbosch
- Kramat of Sheikh Abdur-Rahman Naqshbandi and others, Franschhoek
- Kramat of Hazrat Sayed Ahmed Al-Husaini Qadiri Chishti, Wellington
- Kramat of Sayed Sulaiman, Owen Street cemetery, Ceres

This list is by no means exhaustive and represents only the Kramats and Mazaars currently known and documented. There are undoubtedly hundreds of Kramats, Mazaars and resting places of Awliya Allah yet to be identified, researched and documented throughout South Africa, particularly in the Western Cape. Many remain hidden or forgotten in areas such as Du Toitskloof, Swellendam, Montagu, Wellington, Stellenbosch, Paarl, Vredehoek, Malmesbury, Ceres, Saldanha Bay, Cape Point and Oudekraal (Camps Bay), among many others. Further historical research, local knowledge and community contributions are essential to uncovering and preserving this largely undocumented part of South Africa's Islamic heritage.

=== Sri Lanka ===
- Shaikh Abdul Jawad Alim (Periya Alim) Waliyullah, Kattankudy
- Shaikh Muhsin Maulana Waliyullah, Kattankudy
- Shaikh Puliyan Pokkar Waliyullah, Nochimunai - Batticaloa
- As-Saiiduna Sikkanthar and Khalanthar Waliyullah, Malkampitti - Sammanthurai
- Shaikh Ahmad Meeran Welli Alim Walyullah, Attalachenai
- Shaikhuna Abdul Qadir Soofi Hazarath Nayaham, Kuppiyawatha - Colombo
- Shaikh Usman Waliyullah Shrine, Colombo
- Shaykh Ashraf Waliyullah, Ketchchimalai Mosque, Beruwela
- Shaykh Ahmed Ibn Mubarak Mawlana, Galle
- Darvish Muhiyiddeen Waliyullah, Dafthar Jailani, Kuragala
- Sheikh Inayathullah Waliyullah, Kapthurai Mosque, Weligama
- Sheikh Abdullah Ibn Umar Badheeb Al Yamani Rahimahullah, Kahatowita
- Kunjali Marikkar Rahimahullah, Chilaw
- Bawa Kufi Waliyullah, Kahatapitiya
- Seyyaduna Tuan Zainul Abdeen Sri Pathy Zeenath Raja Waliyullah, Gongawela, Matale
- Seyyada Poong Kullanthai Amma Waliyullah, Nanu Oya
- Sultan Abdul Qadir Waliyullah, Mankumban, Jaffna
- Seyyaduna Kappal Appa Waliyullah, Talai Mannar, Mannar
- Dawood Mawlana Waliyullah, Kalmunai
- Seyyaduna Shihabuddeen Waliyullah, Batticaloa
- Seyyaduna Abdul Qadir Waliyullah, Mancholai, Kinniya
- Khorasan Seyyid Ismail Waliyullah (Galebandara Awliya), Kurunagala
- Seyyiduna Akeel Muhammad Waliyullah, Kotiyakumbura, Kegalle
- Seyyaduna Abdul Jabbar Pal Kudi Bawa Waliyullah, Kataragama
- Shaykh Shihabdeen Waliyullah, Meera Makam Mosque, Kandy
- Sheikh Yoosuf Waliyullah (Alugolla Appa) Alugolla Welimada

=== Syria ===
- Sayyidah Zaynab Mosque, the tomb of Zaynab bint Ali, daughter of Ali and Fatimah, Damascus
- Sayyidah Ruqayya Mosque, the tomb of Sukayna bint Husayn, daughter of Husayn ibn Ali – the grandson of Muhammad, Damascus
- Bab Saghir Cemetery (also called Goristan-e-Ghariban), Damascus. Many famous historical figures, including Umm Kulthum bint Ali and Bilal ibn Ribah are buried here.
- Nabi Habeel Mosque, the tomb of Abel, son of Adam, Damascus
- Araq Tomb, Damascus, dedicated to Suhayb al-Rumi
- Bab al-Hadid, Aleppo
- Bab al-Nasr, Aleppo
- Bab Antakeya, Aleppo
- Hilaliyya Zawiya, Aleppo, mausoleum for Sheikh Mohammed Hilal Ram Hamdani
- Umayyad Mosque (Jaami al-Amawi), Damascus
- Salera Hill, Damascus
- Mount Qasioun, Damascus
- Abū ʿAbd Allāh Bilāl ibn Rabāḥ al-Ḥabashī, Damascus
- Umar bin Abdulaziz Tomb in Dier-As-Sharqi

=== Tajikistan ===
- Mir Sayyid Ali Hamadani, in kholub
- Rudaki, first great literary genius of the Modern Persian language, buried in Rudaki
- Khaja Yaqub al-Charkhi, Gulistan, Dushanbe

=== Turkey ===
==== Istanbul ====
- Eyüp Sultan Mosque, where Muhammad's standard-bearer Abu Ayyub al-Ansari is buried, Eyüp
- Yeralti Mosque (Underground Mosque), where three companions of Muhammad are buried, Karaköy
- Arab Mosque, where the sahabi Maslama ibn Abd al-Malik is buried, Karaköy
- Mehmet Emin Tokadi, Fatih
- Helvacı Baba, a popular saint visited on Fridays, Fatih
- Laleli Baba, a saint who left his mark on Istanbul
- Oruç Baba, an ascetic's tomb that is visited on the first day of Ramadan
- Tezveren Dede, a warrior Sufi who participated in the Conquest of Constantinople
- Zuhurat Baba, a saint who distributed endless water to the warriors of Sultan Fatih during the Conquest
- Koca Mustafa Pasha Mosque, where Sünbül Efendi is buried, Fatih
- Aziz Mahmud Hudayi, Üsküdar
- Jamaluddin al-Kumuki, a shaykh of the Naqshbandi tariqa and relative of Imam Shamil, Karacaahmet Cemetery, Üsküdar
- Joshua's Hill, the maqam of Joshua, the young companion of Musa on his sea trip to meet the sage Khidr, Beykoz
- Yahya Efendi, Beshiktash
- Muhammad Zafar al-Madani, spiritual guide of Sultan Abdul Hamid II, Beshiktash
- Hayreddin Barbarossa, great admiral and Muslim hero of the Mediterranean, Beshiktash
- Merkez Efendi, Yenikapı
- Akbaba, Istanbul, where Akbaba Sultan is buried, Beykoz
- Telli Baba, Sarıyer
- Fatih Sultan Mehmet Mosque, where Mehmed the Conqueror is buried, Fatih
- Süleymaniye Mosque, where Suleyman the Lawgiver is buried, Fatih
- Sultan Abdulhamid Khan, the last effective sultan and caliph of Islam who managed to rule the Ottoman Empire and Caliphate through hard times for 33 years, Fatih

==== Bursa ====
- Emir Sultan Mosque, where Emir Sultan is buried
- Karabaş-i Veli Cultural Centre, where Karabash-i Veli is buried
- Somuncu Baba
- Üftade Mosque and complex
- Molla Fanari
- Ismail Haqqi Bursevi
- Osman Gazi, founder of the Ottoman Empire
- Orhan Gazi, son of Osman who solidified Ottoman rule in Anatolian lands
- Geyikli Baba, a ghazi and dervish of the Bektashi tariqa who participated in the conquest of Bursa, Babasultan

==== Other cities ====
- Rumi, Konya
- Shams Tabrizi, maqam near Rumi, Konya
- Sadr al-Din al-Qunawi, Konya
- Ertuğrul Gazi, father of Osman Gazi, Söğüt, Bilecik
- Sheikh Edebali, spiritual guide and mentor of Osman Gazi, Bilecik
- Sharafuddin Daghestani, a shaykh of the Naqshbandi tariqa authorized in various other Sufi orders, Yalova
- Hasan Sezayi Gulsheni, a Khalwati tariqa shaykh, Edirne
- Hacı Bayram-ı Veli, most popular wali of Ankara
- Shaykh Ali Semerkandi, Çamlıdere, Ankara
- Yunus Emre, folk poet and Sufi mystic who greatly influenced the culture of Turkey, Yunusemre, Eskişehir Province
- Battal Gazi, a warrior saint who played an important role in Turkish folk literature, Seyitgazi, Eskişehir Province
- Haji Bektash Veli, founder of the Bektashi Sufi tariqa, Hacıbektaş
- Shaban-i Veli, a Khalwati tariqa shaykh, Kastamonu
- Hayreddin-i Tokadi, a wali buried on a mountain town on the way between Istanbul and Ankara, Bolu
- Akshamsaddin, spiritual guide and mentor of Mehmed the Conqueror, Göynük, Bolu Province
- Ashab al-Kahf, the cave of the Seven Sleepers, Tarsus
- Mevlid-i Halil Mosque, built at the site of the cave where Abraham is believed to have been born, Urfa
- Said Nursi, the maqam representing his grave since his body was exhumed and lost, Urfa
- Göbekli Tepe, archeological site of the world's oldest megaliths which changed the narrative of the theory of pre-historic settlements, dating back 12,000 years, Urfa
- Alyasa and Zu l-Kifl, tombs of prominent prophets mentioned in the Quran, Eğil, Diyarbakır Province
- Habib-i Najjar Mosque, where the supporter of the disciples was martyred for calling the pagans to the religion of Allah, mentioned in the Quran (Ya-Sin:20-27), Antakya, Hatay
- Beyazid-i Bestami Külliyesi, the maqam of Bayazid Bastami, Kırıkhan, Hatay Province

=== Turkmenistan ===
- Il Arslan Mausoleum, Kuhna Urgench
- Sultan Sanjar mausoleum, Merv
- Khoja Yusuf Hamadani, Merv

=== United Arab Emirates ===
==== Al-Ain ====
- An-Neyadat Cemetery, where a companion of Muhammad is buried.

=== United States ===
==== Pennsylvania ====
- Mosque of Shaikh M. R. Bawa Muhaiyaddeen

==== Michigan ====
- The tomb of Baba Rexheb

=== Uzbekistan ===
- Muhammad al-Bukhari mausoleum in Samarkand. He authored the hadith collection known as Sahih al-Bukhari, regarded by Sunni Muslims as one of the most authentic (sahih) hadith collections.
- Al-Tirmidhi, one of the six most authentic collectors of hadith, buried in Termez.
- Imam Māturīdī, founder of one of the two main Sunni schools of aqida, buried in Samarkand.
- Shah-i-Zinda necropolis. Tombs of Kusam ibn Abbas (cousin of Muhammad); many different 9th–14th century tombs of scholars, poets, military men, etc.
- Baha' al-Din Naqshband, founder of what would become one of the largest Sufi Sunni orders, the Naqshbandi, buried in Bukhara.
- Amir Kulal, an influential Islamic scholar of the mystical Khajagan order, buried in Bukhara.
- Timur, a great conqueror from Uzbekistan, in the Gur-e-Amir mausoleum, Samarkand.

=== Yemen ===
- Qabr Hud, supposed burial place of the prophet Hud.

== See also ==
- Hajj
- Karwan islami International
- Umra
