= Meera Makam Mosque =

Mosque in Kandy, Sri Lanka

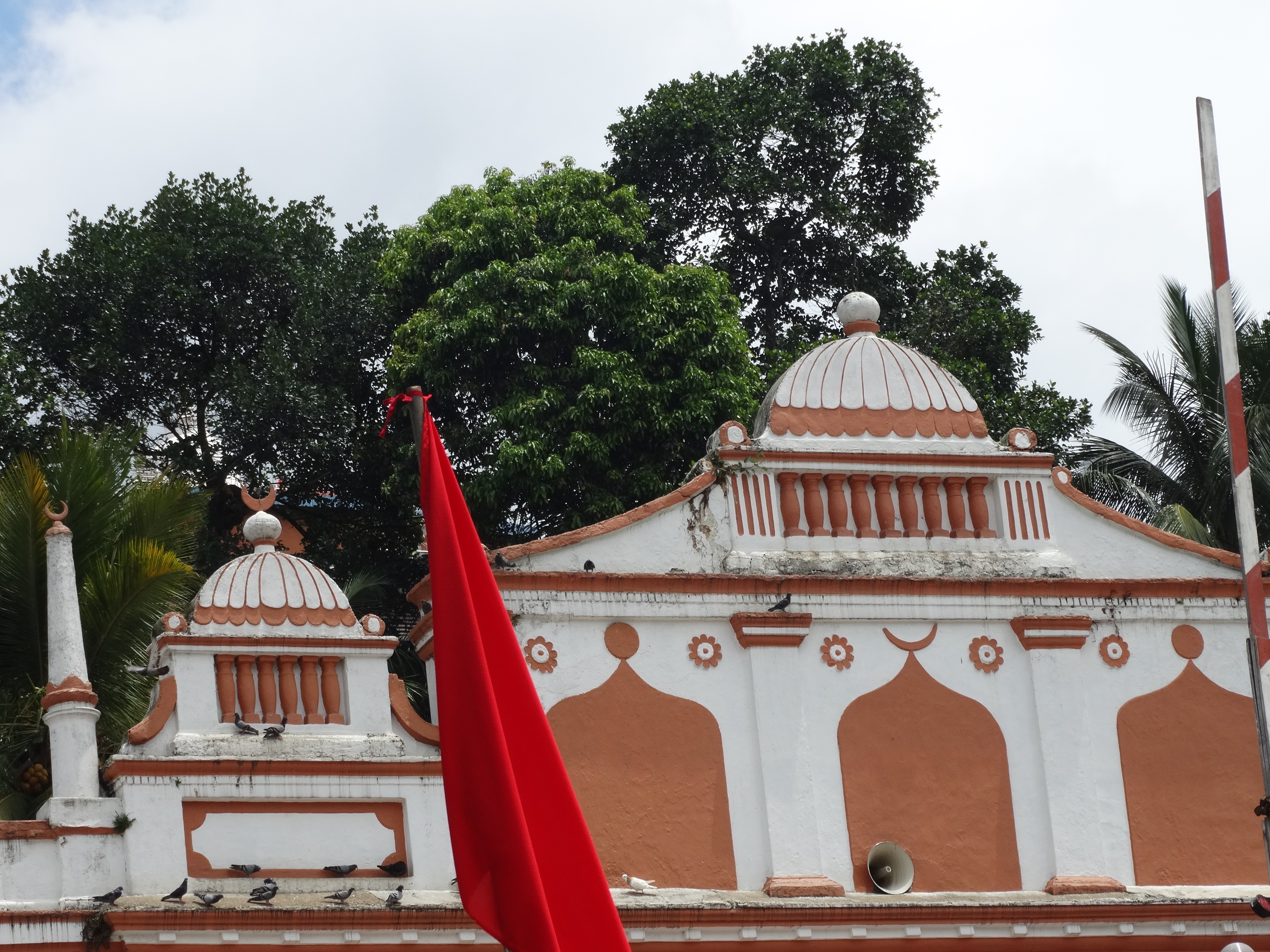

- Location within Sri Lanka

Religion
- Affiliation: Islam
- Province: Central Province

Location
- Location: 2 Wariyapola Sri Sumangala Mawatha
- Municipality: Kandy
- Country: Sri Lanka
- Interactive map of Meera Makam Mosque
- Coordinates: 7.2983333°N 80.6352778°E

Architecture
- Type: mosque
- Style: Baroque
- Completed: 1864

Meera Makam Mosque, also known as Meera Maccam Masjid or Meera Maqam Masjid, is one of the oldest and largest mosques in Kandy, Sri Lanka. It is located at the corner of Wariyapola Sri Sumangala Mawatha and Gamini Dissanayake Mawatha (formerly Hill and Brownrigg Streets).

The land for the mosque was gifted to a Muslim courtier by the King of Kandy, Kirhi Sri Rajasinha, from land owned by the Asgiri Maha Viharaya. Construction on the current mosque commenced in 1855 and was completed in 1864.

The mosque is named in memory of Nagore Sahul Hameed Meeran Sahib Wali, a mystic Sufi saint and Islamic preacher. His student, Shaik Sayyid Sahabdeen Waliyullah, is buried in the mosque.

The building is rectangular with a distinctive façade, painted white with green accents. It has no main minaret or dome.

The mosque has been the site of numerous incidents of anti-Muslim violence, including the defacing of its walls in January 2013 and the stoning of the building on 11 July 2015.

On 6 January 2016 the Prime Minister of Pakistan, Nawaz Sharif, and his wife, attended the mosque, as part of his state visit to Sri Lanka.

On 20 September 2017 the Centre for Islamic Studies and the trustees of the mosque, opened the building up to the public, as part of the country's first 'Open Mosque Day'. The event was held to build bridges with the wider community.

== See also ==
- Islam in Sri Lanka
- List of mosques in Sri Lanka
- List of ziyarat locations
