= Arabic Afrikaans =

Variant of Arabic script used to write the Afrikaans language

Arabic Afrikaans Afrikaans: عربس افركانس
- Script type: Abjad
- Direction: Right-to-left
- Languages: Afrikaans

Related scripts
- Parent systems: Proto-Sinaitic: Phoenician; Aramaic; Nabataean; Arabic; Perso-Arabic; Arabic Afrikaans

Arabic Afrikaans (Afrikaans: Arabies Afrikaans; Arabic Afrikaans: عربس افركانس) or Lisan-e-Afrikaans (Arabic Afrikaans: لسانِ افرکانس) is a form of Afrikaans written in the Perso-Arabic script which began in the madrasas of Cape Town, South Africa in the 1830s. Apart from a 16th-century manuscript in the German language written with Arabic script, it is the only Germanic language known to have been written in the Perso-Arabic script. Arabic Afrikaans is not a mixed language.

== Extant texts ==
Seventy-four Arabic Afrikaans texts are extant. The earliest, the Hidyat al-Islam, is dated 1845, although its source manuscript no longer exists. The oldest surviving manuscript was written by the imam Abdul-Kahhar ibn Abdul-Malik in 1868 and describes basic Islamic learning. Islam had arrived among the Malays during the early 15th century and these works were most likely teaching tools, a way for Muslim teachers to instruct Malay slaves in the Cape while not necessarily being able to speak Dutch very well or at all.

According to the German Hans Kähler, one of the primary scholars in the linguistics of Arabic Afrikaans, about 20 people were responsible for these Arabic Afrikaans texts, with the most important contributors being Abdul Kahhar ibn Hajji Abdul Malik in the early 19th century; Ahmad ibn Muhammad ibn Baha ud-Din and Ismail ibn Muhammad Hanif in the mid-19th century; and Abd ur-Rahman ibn Muhammad Al-Iraqi and Abu Bakr Effendi in the late 19th century.

=== Exposition of the Religion ===
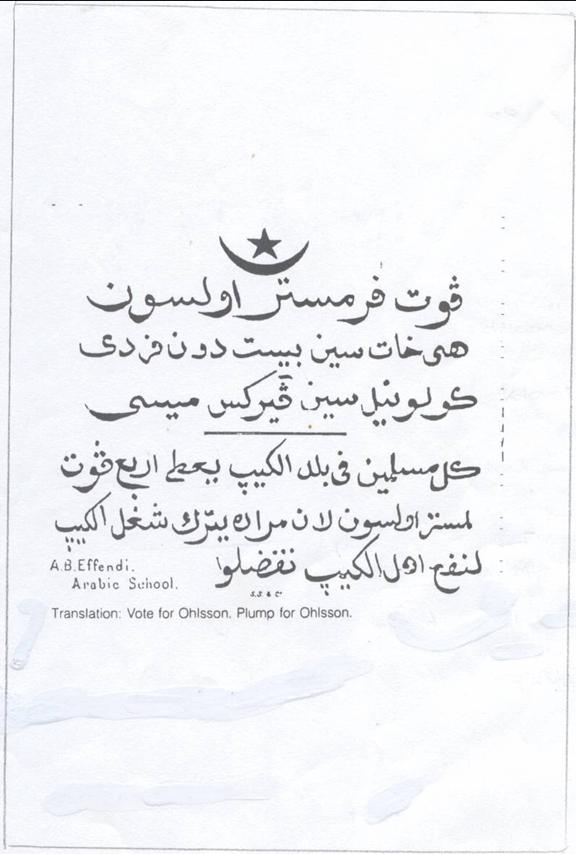
Arabic Afrikaans poster from 1872, attributed to Abu Bakr Effendi

The most professional version of an Arabic Afrikaans text was written in 1869 by Abu Bakr Effendi, who came from Istanbul to the Cape in 1862. Entitled Uiteensetting van die Godsdiens (Exposition of the Religion) it laid out Islamic traditions according to the Hanafi religious law and was printed using Arabic script throughout, including transcriptions of Afrikaans. However, without translation it is nearly impossible for an Afrikaans-speaking person to understand the text, although some words in Exposition of the Religion do appear to resemble phonetic transliterations between Arabic script and the version of Afrikaans spoken by Cape Coloured people, mixed with Dutch.

For example, here is a paragraph of the book transcribed from the Arabic-alphabet text. The italics mark non-Afrikaans words.

"Iek bagent diesie kitab met Allah (ta'ala) sain naam. Allah (ta'ala) es rizq giefar ien dunya fer al wat liefandag ies. Allah (ta'ala) es beriengar ien die gannat ien dag ahirat fer al die miesie an djinns wat oewhap iman gadoet het. Al die dank an parais es rieg fer Allah (ta'ala) alien. Allah (ta'ala) het gagief fer oewhans Islam sain agama. Islam sain agama oek waas gawies fantefoewhar Ibrahim sain agama... An Allah (ta'ala) het gamaak die Qur'an rasulullah sain hadit fer seker dalil fer oewhans... An Allah (ta'ala) het galaat oewhans wiet die riegtie wieg fan die ilms an gahelp fer oewhans oewham ta lier ander miesie oewhap die riegtie manierie."

Here is the same paragraph translated into modern standard Afrikaans.

"Ek begin hierdie boek met Allah (hy is verhewe) se naam. Allah (h.i.v.) is onderhouer in die wêreld vir al wat lewendig is. Allah (h.i.v.) is bringer in die paradys in die laaste dag vir al die mense en djinns wat oop iman gedoen het (m.a.w. in die geloof gesterwe het). Al die dank en prys is reg vir Allah (h.i.v.) alleen. Allah het gegee vir ons Islam se godsdiens. Islam se godsdiens ook was gewees vantevore Abraham se godsdiens...En Allah (h.i.v.) het gemaak die Koran en die profeet se hadit vir seker bewys vir ons...En Allah (h.i.v.) het gelaat ons weet die regte weg van die godsdienswetenskappe en gehelp vir ons om te leer ander mense op die regte manier."

The first Arabic-alphabet version above uses an Arabic word in several places where modern Afrikaans uses a Germanic word since the Arabic words are entirely unknown in Afrikaans. For example, in the first line of the translation wêreld – meaning 'world' – is used for dunya دنيا in the original.

=== Bilingual Qur'an ===
A bilingual Arabic/Afrikaans Qur'an – perhaps written in the 1880s – used Arabic vowels. For example, Surah 67, Ayah 1 says:

	Arabic:	Afrikaans:
No diacritics	تبارك الذي بيده الملك	ان دى كونڠ سكپ اس بيدى هوك الله تعالا ان ڤارلك الله تعالا اس باس فر الدى اتس
With diacritics	تَبَارَكَ ٱلَّذِيْ بِيَدِهِ ٱلمُلْكُ	ان دى كُوْنِڠْ سْكَپْ اس بِيْدِىْ هُوْكَ الله تعالا ان ڤَارْلِكْ الله تعالَا اِسْ بَاس فَِرْ اَلْدِىْ اِتْسْ
Transliterated	tabāraka -llaḏī bi-yadihi l-mulk[u]	°n dī kūniň skap is bīdī hūka Allah taʿālā °n vārlik Allah taʿālā is bās fir aldī its.
In Conventional Afrikaans	Geseënd is Hy in wie se hand die koninkryk is.	En die koningskap is by die hoë Allah taʿālā en waarlik Allah taʿālā is die baas van alle dinge.
In English	Blessed is the One in Whose hand is the kingdom.	And the kingship is with the high Allah (may He be exalted) and truly Allah (may He be exalted) is the boss of all things.

(° = vowel sign missing, ň = /ŋ/ as in "king", ʿ = ayn, underlined = in Arabic.)

In the Afrikaans text:

- /ŋ/ ň is written as ayn but with three dots above ڠ.
- /v/ v is written as ڤ.
- /f/ f in "fir" has both an /a/ vowel and an /i/ vowel.
- The letter of prolongation in ī and ū has sukūn.
- The Afrikaans preposition by is written as part of the next word, likely by copying Arabic language usage with some prepositions.
- The Afrikaans word al = "all" is written as part of the next word, likely by copying Arabic language usage with al- = "the".

== Elements of the language ==
=== Script ===
The Arabic Afrikaans script (alifbe) used to write Afrikaans is a variant of the Perso-Arabic script and consists of 36 letters, as follows:

ݗ	خ	ح	چ	ج	ث	ت	پ	ب	ا
eks	ḵāʾ	ḥāʾ	čīm	ǧīm	sāʾ ṯāʾ	tāʾ	pāʾ	bāʾ	ʾalif
ط	ض	ص	ش	س	ژ	ز	ر	ذ	د
ṭāʾ	zād ḍād	ṣād	šīn	sīn	žāʾ	zāʾ	rāʾ	zāl ḏāl	dāl
گ	ك	ق	ڤ	ف	ڠ	ݝ	غ	ع	ظ
gāf	kāf	qāf	vāʾ	fāʾ	ŋayn	gayn	ḡayn	ʿayn	ẓāʾ ḍāʾ
ے	ي	أ،ؤ،ئ	ء	و	ه	ن	م	ل	لا
ē	yāʾ	ʾalif mahmūzatu l-fawq, wāw mahmūzatu l-fawq, ʾalif maqṣūra mahmūza	hamza	wāw	hāʾ	nūn	mīm	lām	lām-ʾalif

The Persian form of the Arabic alphabet also consists of 36 letters, but also includes extra letters for sounds that are not in the Arabic alphabet, as follows.

Afrikaans Alphabet
Yy	Ww	-	Hh	Nn	Mm	Ll	Gg/gg Gh/gh	Kk/Cc	W/w	Ff/Vv	Ng/ng	Gg/Gh gg/gh	Ch/Gh ch/gh	-	Zz	Tt	Zz	Ss	Sj sj	Ss/Cc	Ss	Zz	Rr	Zz	Dd/Tt	Ch ch	Hh	Xx	Tj tj	Dj dj	Ss	Tt/Dd	Pp/Bb	Bb	-
Arabic Alphabet
ي	و	ء	ہ	ن	م	ل	گ	ك	ڤ	ف	ڠ	ݝ	غ	ع	ظ	ط	ض	ص	ش	س	ژ	ز	ر	ذ	د	خ	ح	ݗ	چ	ج	ث	ت	پ	ب	ا
IPA value
j	w	ʔ	ɦ	n	m	l	g	k	v	f	ŋ	g	ɣ	ʔ(ʕ)	z	t	z	s	ʃ	s	ʒ	z	r	z(ð)	d	x	ɦ(ħ)	ks	t͡ʃ	d͡ʒ	s(θ)	t	p	b	ʔ

=== Vowels ===
The following is a list of vowels used in Arabic Afrikaans.

Afrikaans Latin Alphabet	Pronunciation	Afrikaans Arabic Alphabet
a	/ɐ/	ـَ
aa	/ɑː/	ـَآ، ـَا
i/e	/i/	ـِ
eeu/eu/uu	/iu/, /ɪø/, /y/	ـِى
e	/ɛ/	ىٖ
oe	/u/	ـُ
oo	/ʊə/	ـُوْ
oei/ooi	/ui/, /oːi/	ـُوی
ô	/ɔː/	ـُو
î	/əː/	ـَـِى
ee	/ɪə/	ـِىْ
e	/ɛ/	ویْ
i	/i/, /ə/	ـِـَ
ê	/ɛː/	ـَـِـٖ
o	/ɔ/	ـَـُ
i	/ə/	ـٖى،ـَـِ
û	/œː/	ـَوی
ei	/əi/	آی
ai	/ai/	ـَى
aai	/ɑːi/	ـَای، آی

=== Consonants ===
The following is a list of consonants used in Arabic Afrikaans.

Consonant phonemes
		Labial	Alveolar	Post- alveolar	Velar	Uvular	Glottal
Nasal		m	n		ŋ		
Plosive	voiceless	p	t	t͡ʃ	k	(q)	(ʔ)
Plosive	voiced	b	d	d͡ʒ	ɡ		(ʔ)
Fricative	voiceless	f	s	ʃ		χ	
Fricative	voiced	v	z	ʒ		(ʁ)	ɦ
Approximant		w	l	j			
Rhotic			r				

=== Numerals ===
The following is a list of basic cardinal numerals used in Arabic Afrikaans, with their Afrikaans Latin alphabet equivalents.

Arabic form	Number	Afrikaans Arabic Alphabet (with diacritics)	Afrikaans Arabic Alphabet (without diacritics)	Afrikaans Latin Alphabet
٠	0	نَویل/صِفِر	نویل/صفر	nul
١	1	اَِٖن	ان	een
٢	2	تڤِیْ	تڤی	twee
٣	3	درِ	در	drie
٤	4	ڤِر	ڤر	vier
٥	5	ڤآیف	ڤآیف	vyf
٦	6	سیٖس	سیس	ses
٧	7	سَِٖڤٖی	سڤی	sewe
٨	8	اَخت	اخت	agt
٩	9	نَِٖغٖی	نغی	nege
١٠	10	تنٖ	تن	tien

== Lexicon ==
The following are some key words in Arabic Afrikaans, with their Afrikaans equivalents.

Arabic Afrikaans		English translation	Etymology	Afrikaans Equivalent	
Kitaab	کتاب	book	Arabic كتاب	Boek	بک
dunya	دنیا	world	Arabic دنيا	Wêreld	ڤرلت
Aql	عقل	intellect	Arabic عقل		
Ilm	علم	knowledge	Arabic علم	Kennis	کنس
Waqt	وقت	time	Arabic وقت	tyd	تآیت
Akhirat	آخرة	hereafter	Arabic آخرة	hierna	هرنا
Halaal	حلال	permitted	Arabic حلال		
Haraam	حرام	forbidden	Arabic حرام		
Haq	حق	rights	Arabic حق	reg	رخ
Maqsad	مقصد	goal	Arabic مقصد	doel	دل
Sawal	سوال	question	Arabic سوال	vraag	فراخ
Jawab	جواب	answer	Arabic جواب	Antwoord	انتڤیرت
Jannat	جنت	heaven	Arabic جنة (construct case)	hemel	همل
Jahanaam	جهنم	hell	Arabic جهنم	hel	هیل
Izzat	عزت	respect	Arabic عزة (construct case)	respek	رسپیک
Zillat / Dhillat	ذلت	disrespect	Arabic ذلة (construct case)	beledigen	بلدغی
awwal	اول	start, beginning	Arabic اول	begin	بغن
akhir	آخر	end, last	Arabic آخر	einde	اندی
din	دین	religion	Arabic دين	godsdiens	ختسدنس
Rizq	رزق	sustenance	Arabic رزق		
ustad	استاد	teacher	Persian استاد	onderwyser	اندرڤآیزر
Qaiser	قیصر	Caesar	Arabic قيصر from Latin	Caesar	تسزغ/ سزغ
lisan	لسان	language	Arabic لسان	taal	تال
dua	دعا	prayer	Arabic دعاء	bed	بت
sabr	صبر	patience	Arabic صبر	geduld	غدلت
salat namaz	صلات نماز	ritual prayer	Arabic صلاة (construct case), Persian (نماز)	rituele gebed	برتییل خبویت
dawat	دعوت	invitation (Islamic missionary activity)	Arabic دعوة (construct case)	uitnodiging	اوییتنودغڠ
Falsafah	فلسفه	philosophy	Arabic فلسفة from Greek	filosofie	فلوسوفی
Fitnah	فتنه	trial and tribulation	Arabic فتنة ("strife" / "sedition")	burgeroorlog	بویرخررلخ
ibaadat	عبادت	worship	Arabic عبادة (construct case)	aanbidding	آنبدڠ
iman	ایمان	faith	Arabic إيمان	geloof	خلوف
millat	ملت	personal law	Ottoman Turkish ملت from Arabic ملة (construct case)	persoonlike reg	پرسنلک رخ
yaqin	یقین	certainty,	Arabic يقين	sekerheid	زکرہآیت
Usul	اصول	principles	Arabic أصول	beginsel	بغنسل
Barakat	برکت	blessing	Arabic بركة (construct case)	seën	سن
hasan	حسن	good	Arabic حسن	goed	غت
hikmat	حکمت	wisdom	Arabic حکمة (construct case)	wysheid	ڤسهت
Baazaar	بازار	market	Persian بازار	Baazaar	بازار
nikah	نکاح	marriage	Arabic نكاح (archaic)	bruiloft	بروییلفت
Qiyaamat	قیامت	Day of Resurrection	Arabic قيامة (construct case, "judgment day")	dag des oordeels	دخ دی اوردلس
alam	عالم	world	Arabic عالم	Wêreld	ڤرلت
insan	انسان	human	Arabic إنسان	mens	منس
haiwan	حیوان	animal	Arabic حيوان	dier	در
jahil	جاهل	ignorant	Arabic جاهل	onwetend	انڤتنت
wazir	وزیر	minister	Arabic وزير	minister	منستر
daftar	دفتر	notebook	Arabic دفتر	Notaboek	نوتابک
fasad	فساد	corruption	Arabic فساد	korrupsie	کریپس
hayat	حیات	life	Arabic حياة (construct case)	lewe	لوی
maut	موت	death	Arabic موت	dood	دوت
sabt	سبت	Saturday	Arabic سبت	Saterdag	ساترداخ
shams	شمس	sun	Arabic شمس	son	سن
junub	جنوب	south	Arabic جنوب	suid	سویت
qamar	قمر	moon	Arabic قمر	maan	مان
najm	نجم	star	Arabic نجم	ster	ستیر
zawja	زوجه	wife	Arabic زوجة	vrou	فروی
zawj	زوج	couple	Arabic زوج	paar	پار
shamaal	شمال	north	Arabic شمال	noord	نورت
gharb/maghrib	مغرب غرب	west	Arabic مغرب غرب	wes	ڤیست
yaum	یوم	day	Arabic يوم	dag	دخ
laylat	لیلت	night	Arabic ليلة (construct case)	nag	نخ
sharq/mashriq	مشرق شرق	east	Arabic مشرق شرق	oost	اوست

== See also ==
- Aljamiado
- Cape Malays
- Islam in South Africa
