= Abu Bakr Effendi =

Ottoman-Cape Colony clergyman (1814–1880)

Sheikh Abu Bakr Effendi
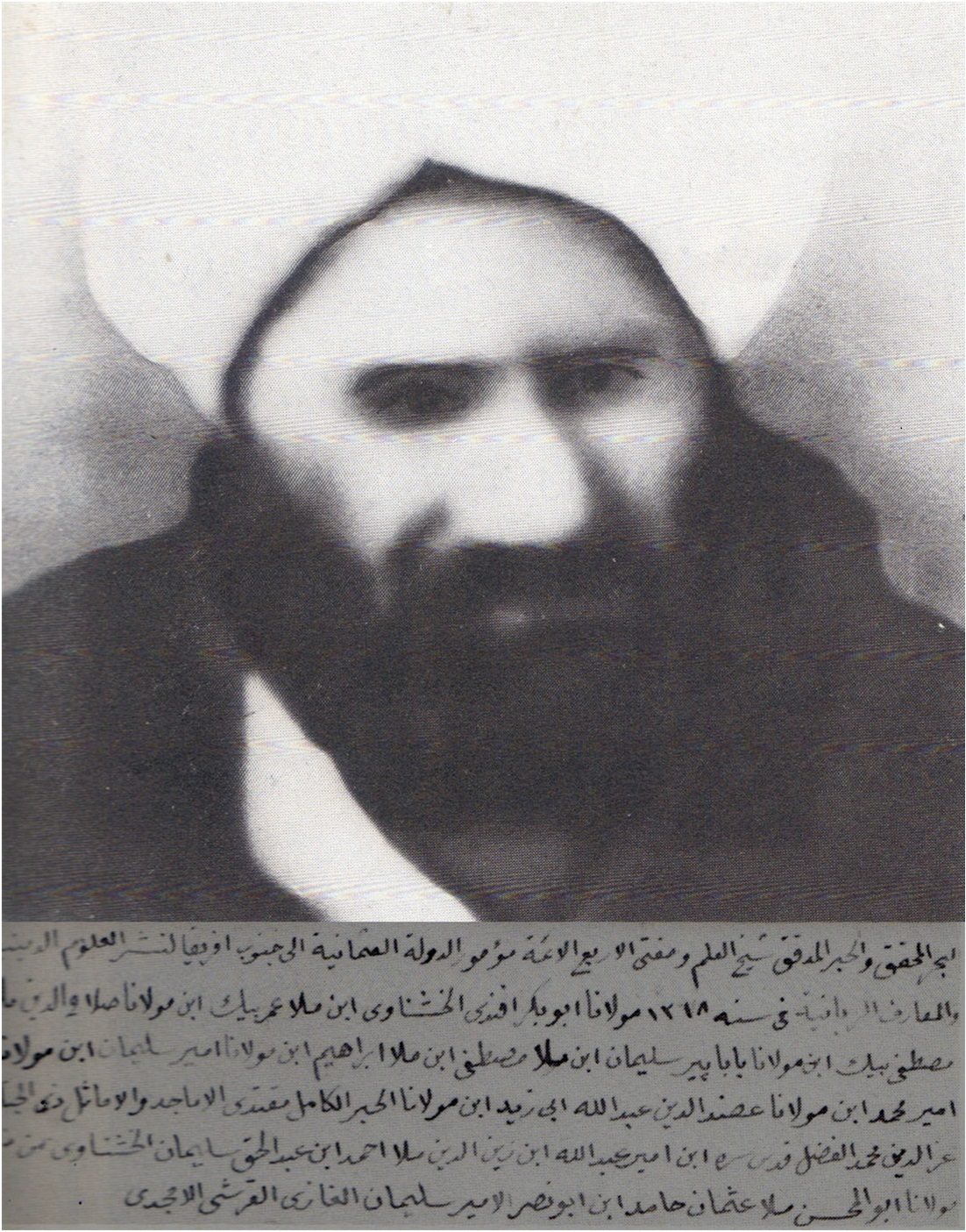

Personal life
- Born: c. 1814 Shahrizor, Ottoman Empire
- Died: 1880 Cape Town, Cape Colony
- Resting place: Tana Baru Cemetery, Cape Town, South Africa
- Era: Tanzimat
- Notable work: Bayân al-Dîn (1877)
- Education: Fatih Madrasa
- Occupation: Teacher, Statesman, Alim

Religious life
- Religion: Islam
- Denomination: Sunni Islam
- Jurisprudence: Qadi

Muslim leader
- Awards: Order of the Mejidie

Sheikh Abu Bakr Effendi (c. 1814 – 29 June 1880), also spelt Ebu Bekir Efendi, was an Ottoman qadi sent in 1862 by Sultan Abdulaziz at the request of Queen Victoria to the Cape Colony, in order to teach and assist the Muslim community of the Cape Malays. He is known for having made several major contributions to Islam in South Africa, including the translation of his 1877 work, Bayân al-Dîn, into the Afrikaans language, then in a very early stage of development. He is credited with introducing the fez as headwear for male Muslims in the Cape, and his presence had a significant impact on the expansion and consolidation of Islam in the Cape Colony.

== Early life ==
Abu Bakr Effendi (Ebu Bekir Efendi) was born in 1814, although his year of birth has often been erroneously cited as 1835. He was from a Sayyid family which originated from Mecca and migrated into Abbasid then Seljuk territory. Effendi was born in the Ottoman Province of Zor. He is a direct descendant of the Islamic prophet Muhammad through Zayd ibn Ali, son of Imam Zayn al-Abidin, and was of Arab and Kurdish origin.

He was born in Ottoman province Shahrizor Eyalet. His father, Molla Omar Al-Baghdadi, an Ottoman Governor, was killed in a local nationalist Kurdish uprising against the Ottoman authority. He studied at the madrassa originally set up by his ancestor Abu Nasr Al-Amiyr Sulaymaan Al-Qurashiy Al-Amjadiy (c. 1060 - c. 1134) for any who wish to learn. He also studied in Makkah, and joined his family in Erzurum. His Cousin and future son in law was Seyyid Abdürrezzak ilmi Efendi. He is also the great-uncle of Ömer Nasuhi Bilmen. Not much is known of Emir Sulaymaan from Effendi's personal documents. He was however a contemporary of Suleyman Ghazi, the founder of the Ottoman Empire and Suleyman Sultan of Rum.

He undertook further studies and in Erzurum, and then went to Istanbul in 1862 to ask for help for the people of Erzurum, who were suffering the effects of famine. He was then asked by the government to give holy teachings in the Cape Colony. This came about after Queen Victoria had written to Sultan Abdulaziz to ask him to send someone, as discord had arisen among the Cape Malays between groups who had been isolated from their mother tongue and original religious traditions. On 3 September or October 1862, an Ottoman Imperial decree was issued for the dispatch of Abu Bakr and Omar Lutfi Effendi to the Cape. The two men travelled first to London via Paris on 1 December, spending two months there before travelling to Liverpool, their port of departure, whence their journey by sea took 44 days to reach the Cape. They arrived in the Cape on 17 January 1863.

== Life and work in South Africa ==
The Cape Malays had arrived in the Cape of Good Hope mainly as slaves, brought there by Dutch settlers from 1653, from what is now Indonesia. The Dutch East India Company, since an edict by Joan Maetsuycker, Governor-General of the Dutch East Indies, in 1657, had compelled the Malays to hide their religious practice, with death as the punishment for practising their faith in public or for attempting to convert anyone.

Other imams in the Cape were mostly trying to teach the Shafi`i school of Islamic jurisprudence, but were influenced by cultural practices from their places of origin. Also being enslaved and away from their places of origin for so long meant that they had drifted from their original beliefs, hence their cry of assistance to the British Empire. Effendi was a follower and the first teacher of Hanafi school, for which he also established a madrassa in Cape Town. Shortly after Effendi's arrival, Muslim men in the Cape started wearing the fez due to his influence; they had formerly worn a conical style of hat. It was easy for him to adapt considering he was a Mufti of all 4 schools of Madhhab.

He gained notoriety in 1869 after ruling that rock lobster and snoek, two staple foods in the Cape, were sinful (haraam), and there was an unsuccessful petition run to have him removed. He has often been mistaken for being a Shafi'i on the basis of him being a Scholar of the four schools of Sunni Islam, and being able to issue religious edicts according to each one. Most of this opposite was due to Effendi's deep opposition to the Imam's of the Cape having a Succession system in the local mosques to maintain wealth and power instead of handing it over to the most learned. His ancestors and children practised the Hanafi school of thought, but some later converted under pressure and marriage to the local mathaab.

== Death and legacy ==
Effendi died on 29 June 1880 at his home in Bree Street, Cape Town, and was buried in the Tana Baru Cemetery. He had contracted malaria from reportedly travelling to Dera in Mozambique.

His most visible impact was the wearing of the fez by Malay men, but his presence also had a significant impact on the growth and self-identity of the Cape Malay Muslims at the Cape. The expansion of Islamic schools drew children from Christian mission schools, and conversion to Christianity drew to a halt. Attendance at mosques and other Islamic religious observances grew.

=== Publication ===
He published the Arabic Afrikaans Uiteensetting van die godsdiens (Bayân al-Dîn (meaning "the exposition of the religion") in 1877, printed by the Turkish Ministry of Education in Istanbul. The book is of particular significance as one of the most extensive publications when the Afrikaans language was still in its infancy. The Bayân al-Dîn described topics of Islamic law, including ritual ablution, prayer, pilgrimage and dietary laws.

Also, written in a modified Arabic script with phonetic spelling, it gives a good indication of the pronunciation of the new language in the Cape at the time as used in the Islamic neighbourhoods (colloquially known as "Slams") of Cape Town, giving insight into the use of the new language in these communities. It was written in a modified Arabic script in which diacritic signs are used to indicate the pronunciation of Afrikaans, and bears testimony to the slave origins of the language, which was not later accredited by the White Afrikaners, especially during the era of apartheid in the mid-20th century. (The Cape Malays did not have Dutch as mother tongue, and were therefore mostly unaffected by its orthography.)

The book, totalling 254 pages, appears to follow the Hanafite law-school. It was divided into eight parts, each dealing with a specific part of Islamic law:

1. ritual cleansing (pp. 2–66)
2. ritual prayer (pp. 66–219)
3. religious tax (pp. 219–258)
4. fasting (pp. 258–284)
5. slaughtering of livestock (pp. 284–302)
6. religious prohibitions (pp. 302–344)
7. drink (pp. 344–349)
8. hunting (pp. 349–354)

Adrianus van Selms, a Dutch scholar and Semitic researcher, published a transliteration in Latin script of Effendi's work in 1979. Since the original work presented spoken Afrikaans without using vowels, van Selms biggest task was to decipher which Afrikaans words were being referred to. Effendi had also innovated new Arabic characters for several Afrikaans letters not found in the Arabic alphabet, the letter 'P' for example. What is interesting is that these innovated letters had to be unique, yet still recognisable by the population who were already schooled in traditional Arabic. Since this was a local modification to the language, used only amongst the Cape Muslim Community, it may have proved illegible for those familiar with traditional Arabic.

== Family and descendants ==
Abu Bakr Effendi's first wife was from Erzurum with whom he had children but were left in the Ottoman Empire on his mission to South Africa. His first wife in South Africa was Rukea Maker, said to be the daughter of an English woman and a Cape Muslim man, but this marriage ended with divorce and his wife eloping. He sent his 2 sons from this marriage to Istanbul under the patronage of the Ottoman Sultan. His daughter Fahimah was his eldest child from his marriage to Maker.. This is however contested as Fahimah has no birth certificates in South Africa unlike his other children.

His second wife was the daughter of a shipbuilder from Yorkshire, England, Jeremiah Cook, who was a relative of famous explorer James Cook. Many of Effendi's descendants originate from his marriage to Tohora Saban Cook, with whom he had six children. His five sons were Ahmad Ataullah, Hisham Nimatullah, Omar Jalaluddin, Muhammad Alauddin, and Hussain Fowzy.

Ahmad (also spelt Achmat) became involved in Cape politics. He became a member of the Cemetery Committee because the cemetery where his father's grave was situated was threatened with closure by the Cape Administration. He stood for the legislature of the Cape but failed to get the required votes for a seat due to a change in the system for cumulative votes, amended especially to keep him out of the Cape legislature. In Singapore is the grave of Abu Bakr Effendi's son, Ahmed, who was the Ottoman Ambassador to Singapore.

Some of Effendi's sons served in the Ottoman Army and fought in the Hejaz, against the Anglo and Arab nationalist uprising against the Ottoman Empire.

Many of Abu Bakr Effendi's descendants continue to reside in South Africa, some under the surname Emjedi, while some returned to Turkey and others migrated to Australia.

On 20 August 2020, 15 of Abu Bakr Effendi's South African descendants became Turkish citizens by presidential decree.
