= Hilaliyya Zawiya =

Building in Aleppo, Syria

The Hilaliyya Zawiya is a zawiya located in the east part of the Jallum quarter of Aleppo, Syria. It was reconstructed in 1790 to accommodate a mausoleum for Sheikh Mohammed Hilal Ram Hamdani. It has evolved into a place where pilgrims could meditate in seclusion.
