= Araq Tomb =

The Araq Tomb is a tomb in al-Mayadani al-Wastani district of Damascus, Syria. It was built by governor Araq bin Abdullah al-Salahdar. It is dedicated to the holy man Suhayb ar-Rumi.
