= Tana Baru Cemetery =

Cemetery in Bo-kaap, Cape Town, South Africa

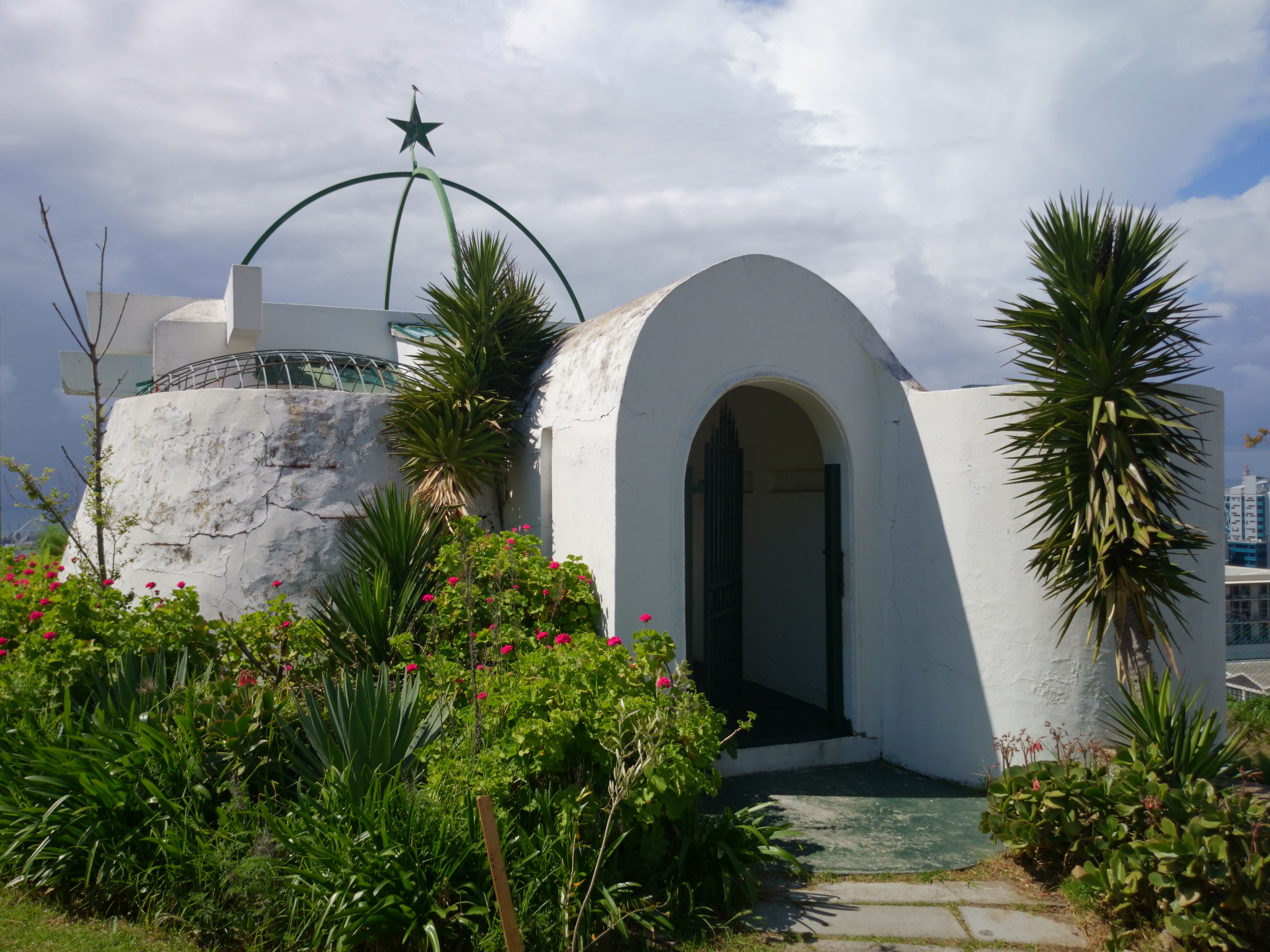
- A burial shrine at the cemetery
- Interactive map of Tana Baru Cemetery

Details
- Established: 1804
- Location: Bo-kaap, Cape Town
- Country: South Africa
- Coordinates: 33°55′7″S 18°24′54″E
- Type: Muslim

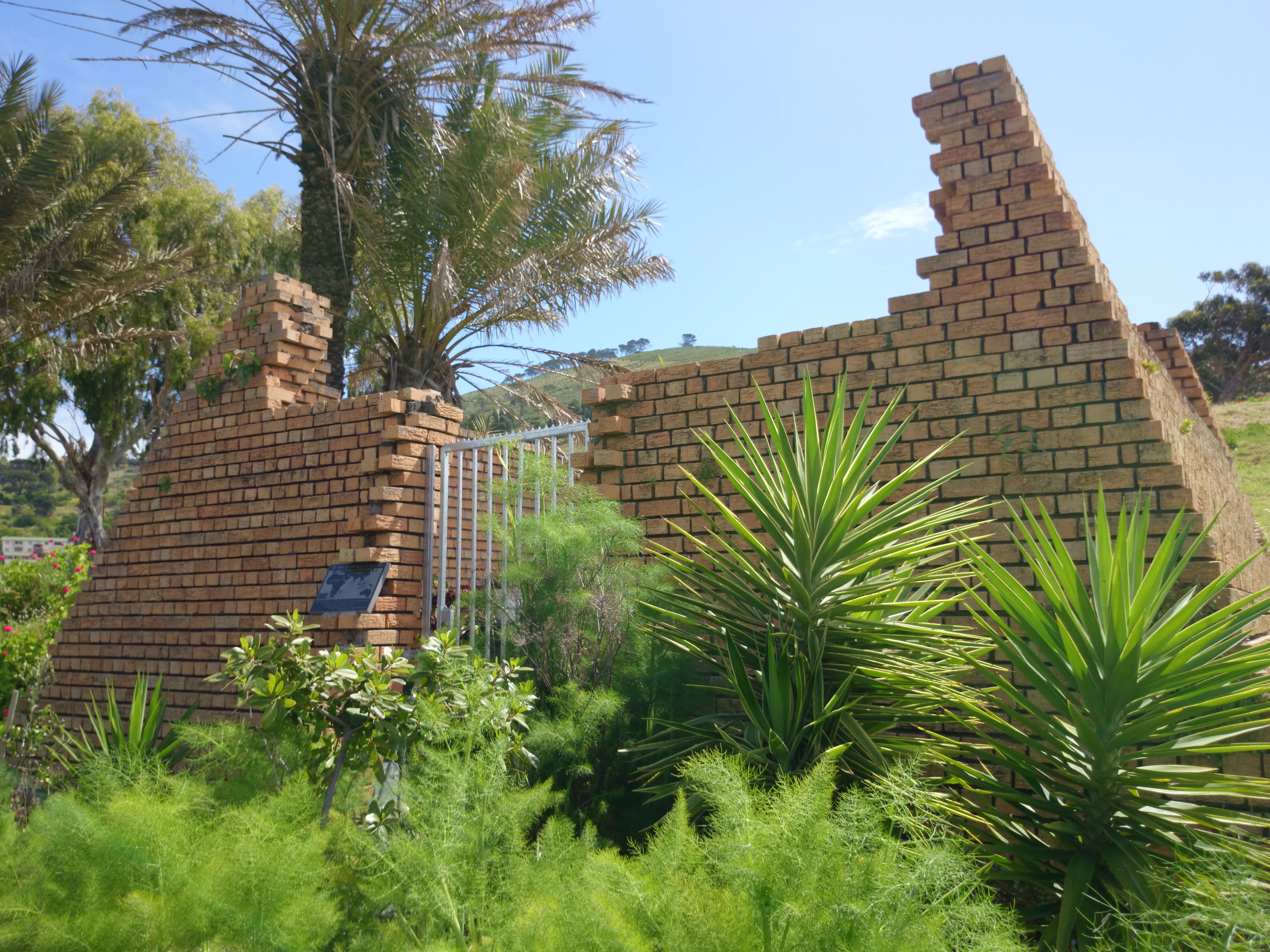
One of the two burial shrines at the cemetery

The Tana Baru Cemetery is a Muslim cemetery where some of the earliest and respected Muslim settlers of South Africa were buried. The cemetery is located in Bo-kaap, Cape Town.

After religious freedom was granted to Muslims in 1804, the Batavian government assigned the first piece of land for use as a Muslim cemetery. It was called Tana Baru, meaning, New Ground. The Tana Baru is currently closed for use, but has always been regarded as the most hallowed of Muslim cemeteries in Cape Town. Within the cemetery is buried three prominent early Cape Muslim Imams, namely, Tuan Nuruman, Tuan Sayeed Alawse and Tuan Guru along with shrines erected to honour them.

== Derivative of the Name ==
The name Tana Baru is derived from Malay. This language was commonly spoken by the Cape Muslims during the eighteenth century. "Tana" means "Ground" and "Baru" means "New", hence "New Ground."

== History ==
There is archival evidence pointing to the fact that the area was used "unofficially" for burial of Muslims prior to the official land grant. In 1804, religious freedom was granted by the Batavian Administration that allowed those of the Islamic faith to build mosques and to allocate a burial site for Muslims in the Cape.

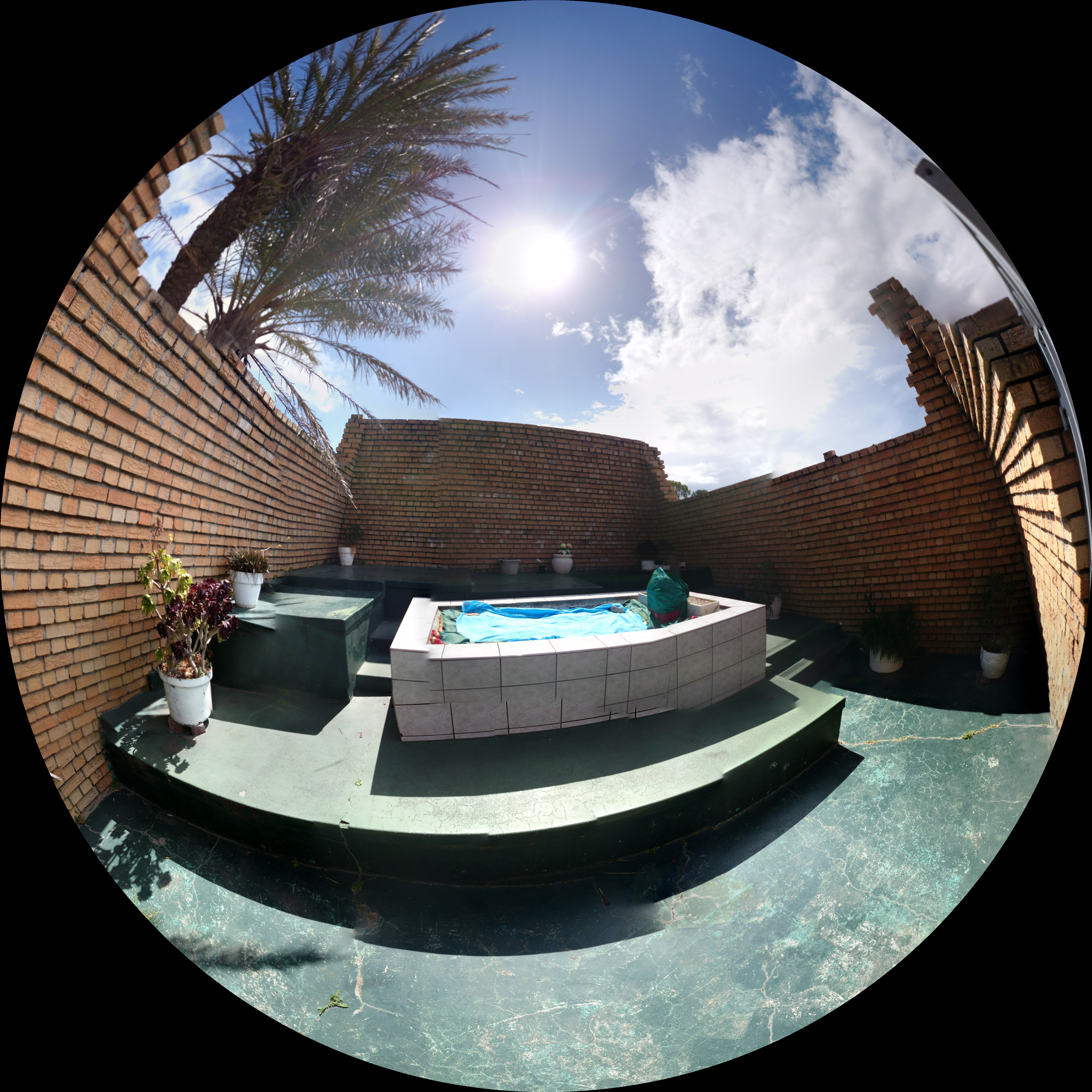
The inside look of one of the tombs

This first piece of land as burial site was acquired in the year 1805, and was granted to Frans of Bengal by the Raad der Gemeente in an effort to retain Muslim loyalty in the event of British invasion. Imaum Abdullah Kadi Abdus Salaam, who was pioneer of the Cape Ulema and Chief Imam was buried at the Tana Baru in 1807.

In 1886, the cemetery was officially closed by the government.

In 1998, The Tana Baru Trust was registered as a legal entity and Imam Abdurahman Bassier becomes its first Chairperson, but died some 6 years later, and was succeeded by Taliep Sydney.

Twelve new Trustees were elected at the AGM in 2008 and Faried Allie becomes the third chairperson of the Trust. Currently, Mogamat Shaheed Jacobs is the Chairperson after Faried Allie died on June 6, 2012.

== Closing of the Cemetery ==
The cemetery's official closure by the government was on January 15, 1886 and based on sanitary grounds (Sections 63 to 65 of the Public Health Act of 1883). The public was upset about this so two days later Abdol Burns led three thousand Muslims to Tana Baru to bury a child there defying the law. This was followed by the arrests of Burns and twelve people.

An eighteen month old girl was buried here in 1916. There were more tombstones present in the early 1900s, which indicates that the cemetery had continued to be used.

== Tana Baru Trust ==
The decline of the cemetery led to the creation of the Committee for the Preservation of the Tana Baru in 1978. With the help of Imam Bassier, a few community workers, and Achmat Davids, the Tana Baru Trust was registered as a legal entity in 1998.

The Tana Baru Trust's aim is it secure an official footing for the preservation and restoration of the oldest Muslim cemetery in South Africa.

== Notable people ==
The ‘New Ground’ cemetery was purchased by Cape Imams during the 1800s. It is said to be one of the oldest surviving cemeteries in existence and is known for the burial of three important leaders: Tuan Naruman, Tuan Sayeed Alawse and lastly, Tuan Guru / Imam Abdullah Kadi Abdus Salaam.

=== Tuan Naruman ===
Officially elected as an imam for individuals residing in what was known as the Slave Lodge. Naruman was praised as an oracle, his followers respected him for all of the “good deeds he performed”. According to sources, Naruman was a “wali” which means that he was a guardian and protector. People felt safe and secure around him. Not only was he a fantastic leader but he was a former slave which makes him further more trustworthy in the eyes of common folk. Naruman was known for his “aura” when he prayed. Tuan Nuruman was banished to the Cape from Batavia, Indonesia. After being enslaved, it is said that he lived a simple life and that he was fond of children and animals. By his grave is a well for animals to drink out of. It is also believed that he could predict the future and thus, he was often sought after for the talismans he made.

=== Tuan Sayed Alawie ===
A prisoner from Mocca, Yemen, Tuan Said Alawie was supposed to be imprisoned for life at Robben Island. However, he was released after eleven years and decided to stay and promote Islam among free and enslaved black people, becoming the first official imam for the Muslim community in the Cape. Although it was illegal, most slave owners chose not to enforce it as Christian slaves were to be freed upon their owner's death.

=== Tuan Guru ===
Regarded as a saint, Tuan Guru was a banished prince from the island of Tidore in Indonesia. He was imprisoned in the Cape during the 1780s for being suspected of trying to overthrow the Dutch colonial government. During his imprisonment, he wrote the Ma’rifah al’Islam wa al’Iman (Manifestations of Islam and Faith), a book about Islamic jurisprudence. This book became the main source of reference for the Muslims of Cape when it came to religious issues, even being cited by the Cape Supreme Court. He also made two copies of the Quran from memory with few mistakes. Upon his release, he established the Auwal Mosque and his younger son Abdol Rauf became the imam of the Nurul Islam mosque and the Claremont Main Road Mosque.
