= Hashim Peer Dastagir =

Indian Sufi Saint

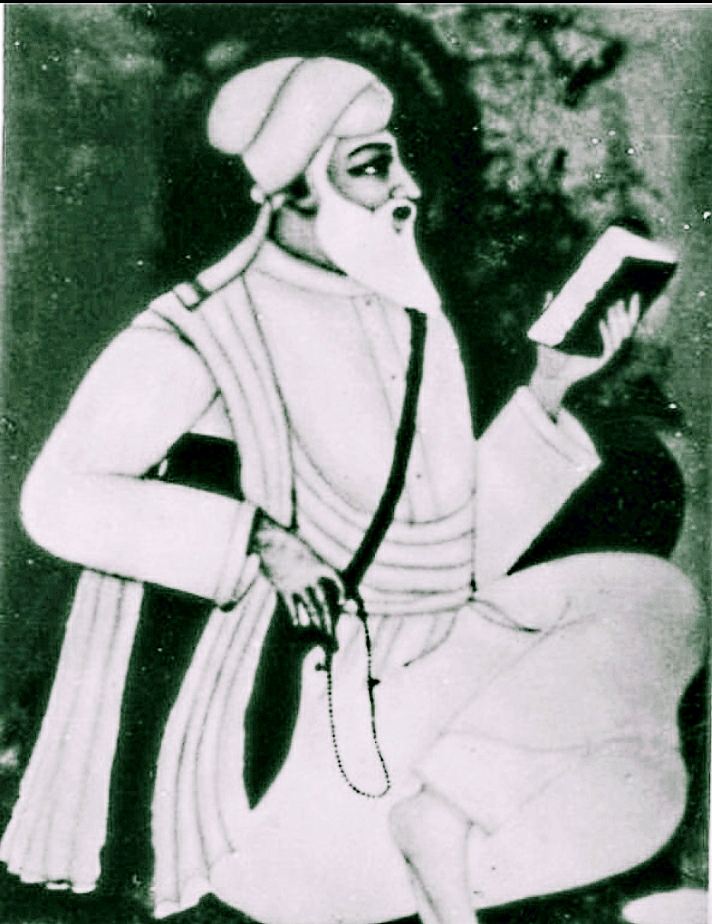
Sayyadna Hashim Peer Dastagir

Hashim Peer Dastagir, also known by the honorific Qutub-e-Deccan ("Axis of the Deccan"), (Arabic: هاشم پیر دستگیر) was an Indian Sufi saint belonging to the Qadri Shattari order. His shrine is in Bijapur, Karnataka, India.

== Life ==
Hazarat Dastagir were born in 1576 in Ahmedabad, Gujarat, and are said to have died in 1646. Hazarat were brought up in a scholastic atmosphere under the particular influence of Wajihuddin Alvi, a Khalifa of Muhammad Ghawth. According to a later account, Dastagir's direct spiritual initiation came from Shah Abdullah Husaini Qadri Shattari, who served as Wajihuddin Alvi's principal khalifa in Ahmedabad; recognising his disciple's spiritual potential, Shah Abdullah Husaini is said to have sent him onward to Bijapur.

Hazarat Dastagir went to Bijapur, Karnataka, then under the rule of Ibrahim Adil Shah II. Under Hazrat's influence Ibrahim Adil Shah then gave up un-Islamic practices. The next Sultan Mohammed Adil Shah was Hazrat's disciple. When the Sultan was suffering from a serious disease, Dastagir stated that they are granting to his disciple ten years of his life. As a consequence, the Sultan built the monument of Gol Gumbaz deliberately close to Hazarat's shrine, so that the tomb would remain under its saint's shadow.

== Shrine ==
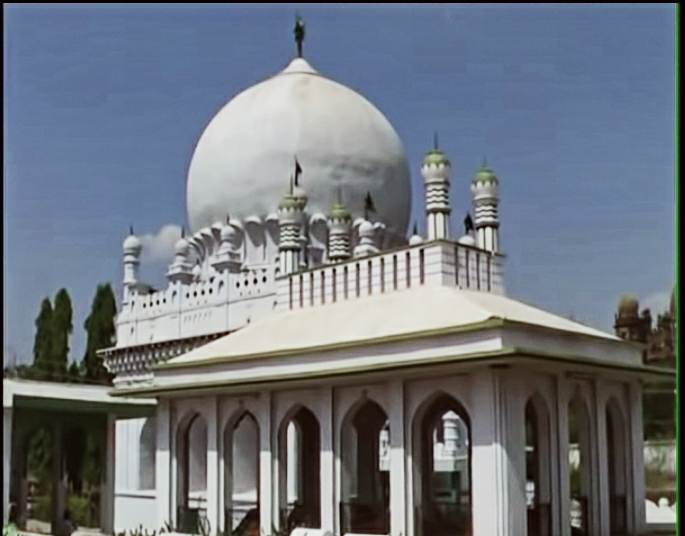
Shrine of Hashim Peer Dastagir

Hazarat shrine is in Bijapur. The shrine of Hashim peer Dastagir is a symbol of communal harmony, since it attracts the crowds from all religious faiths. The shrine was built by Mohammad Adil Shah in 1649. Every year, thousands of devotees attend the annual Urs celebration of Hashim peer Dastagir. Sayed Shah Murtuza Husaini Hashimi is the chief of the shrine and a descendant of Hashim Peer Dastagir.

== Legacy ==
Successors of Dastagir include Haji Wajihuddin Gujrati Alwi Qadri Shattari. Later, the succession passed to Sufi Sarmast Ali Shah Qalandar. His shrine is located in Nandura, Maharashtra. Maulana Muhammad Siddiq was his successor. Succession passed to Muhammad Ghani Qadri Shattari and subsequently to Muhammad Wali Qadri Shattari. Muhammad Ghani's shrine is located in Sufi Nagar Kondhali in Maharashtra. It is said that Mushtaque Husain Qadri Shattari is one of the current figurehead of this order.

== See also ==
- Muhammad Ghawth
- Wajihuddin Alvi
- Shattari
