= Khirala Sharif Dargah =

Shrine in Madhya Pradesh, India

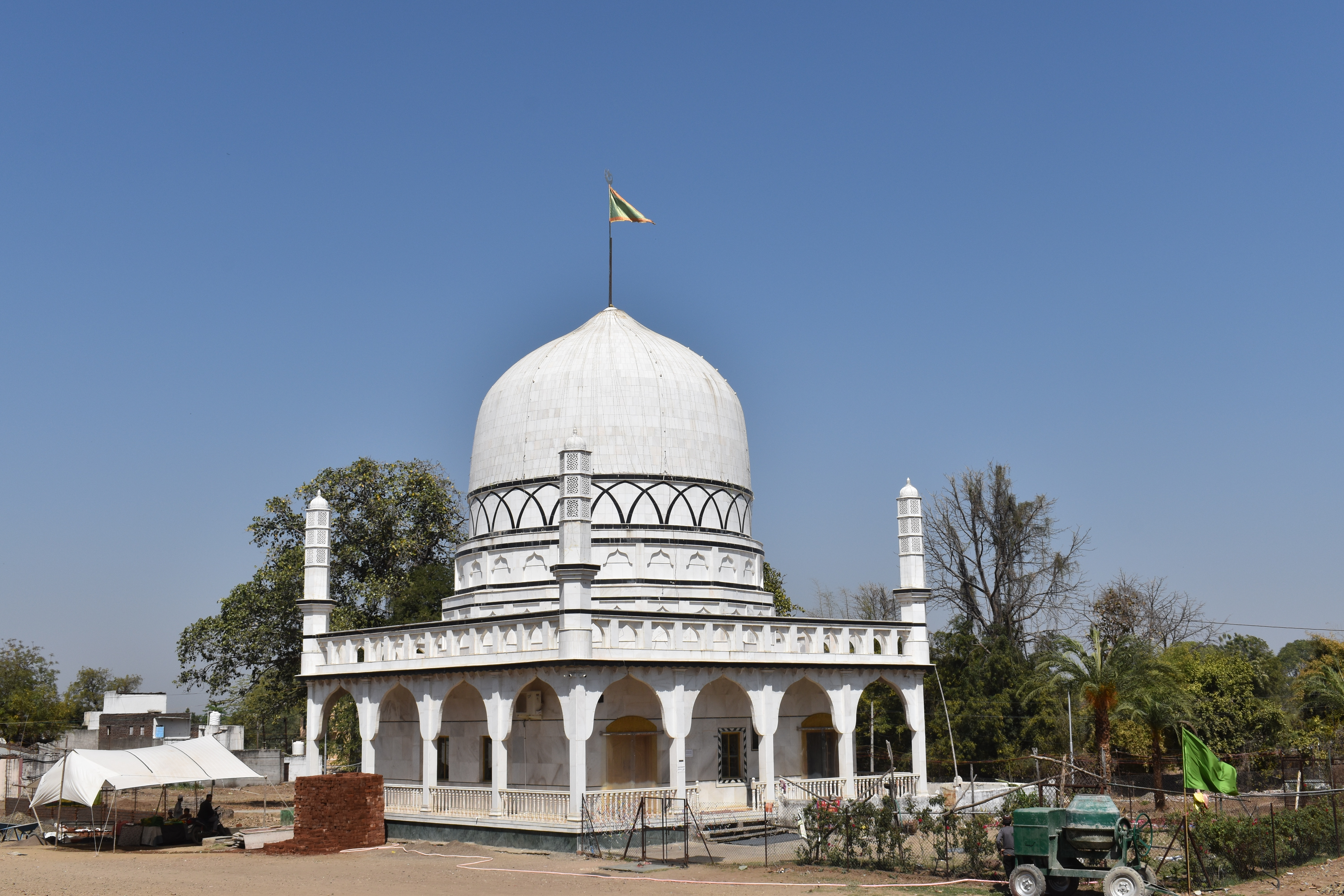
- Dargah Sharif Of Haji Sayyed Muhammad Badiuddin Zia-ul-Haq Qadri Shattari

- Location within Madhya Pradesh Location within India

Religion
- Affiliation: Islam
- District: Khandwa district
- Province: Madhya Pradesh
- Ecclesiastical or organizational status: Shrine

Location
- Location: Khirala
- Country: India
- Interactive map of Khirala Sharif Dargah
- Coordinates: 21.69487°N 76.2203838°E

Architecture
- Architect: Sunni-Al-Jamaat
- Type: Mosque, Sufi mausoleum
- Style: Modern

Specifications
- Dome: 1
- Minaret: 4
- Shrine: 1

Khirala Sharif Dargah is a Dargah (Tomb) or Monument of Sayyed Mohammed Badiuddin Zia-ul-Haq Qadri Shattari located in Khirala village in the Khandwa District of Madhya Pradesh state, India.
