= Qadri Shattari =

Sufi order

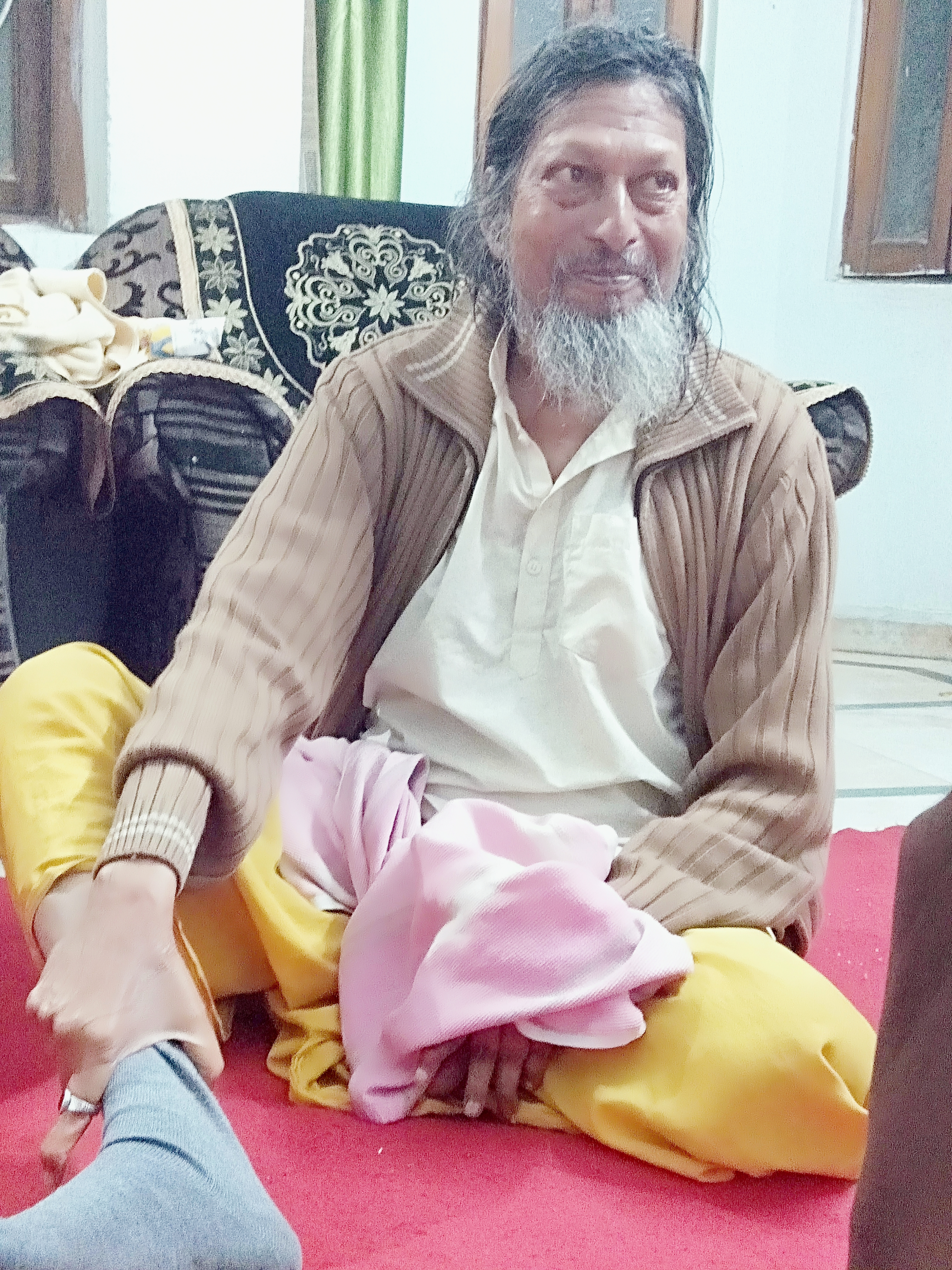
- Sayyad Mushtaq Hussain Ali Mast Qadri Shattari, the current figurehead of the Qadri–Shattari lineage
- Type: Sufi order
- Origins: India
- Region served: India, Pakistan, Indonesia
- Key people: Muhammad Ghawth, Bahauddin Ansari Qadiri Shattari, Hashim Peer Dastagir, Shah Inayat Qadiri, Bulleh Shah
- Website: https://www.qadrishattari.xyz

The Qadri Shattari (also known as the Qadiri-Shattari) is a Sufi order representing the Shattariyya branch of the Qadiriyya silsila, primarily active in India and Pakistan. The order is characterized by its adherence to the concept of Wahdat al-wujūd (Unity of Existence) and the historical adoption of syncretic practices combining Islamic and Hindu mysticism.

Historically, the Qadri Shattari intersection emerged during the tenure of Bahauddin Ansari (d. 1516), a Qadiri Sufi who integrated Shattari methods into his practice. The order exerted influence over the political and cultural landscape of the Mughal Empire and the Sultanates of the Deccan. Notable figures associated with the lineage include the Punjabi poet Bulleh Shah (d. 1757), his mentor Shah Inayat Qadiri (d. 1728), and the scholar Wajihuddin Alvi (d. 1589). The order's contributions to Indo-Pakistani culture include developments in Persian and Punjabi literature, poetry, and the arts.

The order's spiritual practices frequently incorporated yogic elements, such as breath control (pranayama), postures, and the visualization of chakras, specifically the Anahata chakra. In the contemporary era, the order is led by Sayyad Mushtaq Hussain Ali Mast Qadri Shattari. Modern outreach and academic study of Sufism are facilitated through the Qadri Shattari Institute of Sufi Studies, an online platform noted by scholars for its role in the digital expression of Sufi mystical ideas.

== History ==
The Qadiri-Shattari intersection was developed during the time of Bahauddin Ansari Qadri Shattari (d. 1516), who was himself a Qadiri Sufi but followed the Shattari way of Sufism. Another prominent example of intersection came when Wajihuddin Alvi, a Qadri Sufi, was initiated into the Shattari Sufi traditions by Muhammad Ghawth.

=== Influence on sultans ===
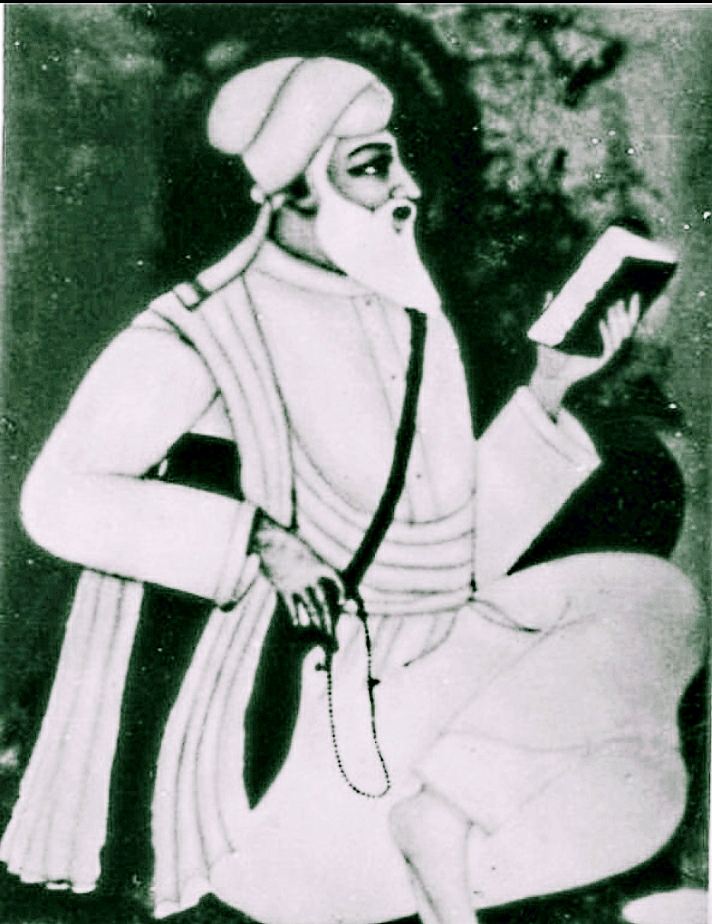
Sayyadna Hashim Peer Dastagir

Qadri Shattari saints such as Hashim Peer Dastagir (d.1649) had influence on the sultans of Bijapur. Mohammed Adil Shah of Bijapur (r. 1627-56) used to consult Dastagir on all important state matters. Historical accounts say that the mausoleum of Dastagir was constructed by the order of Adil Shah in 1649 in honor of the saint.

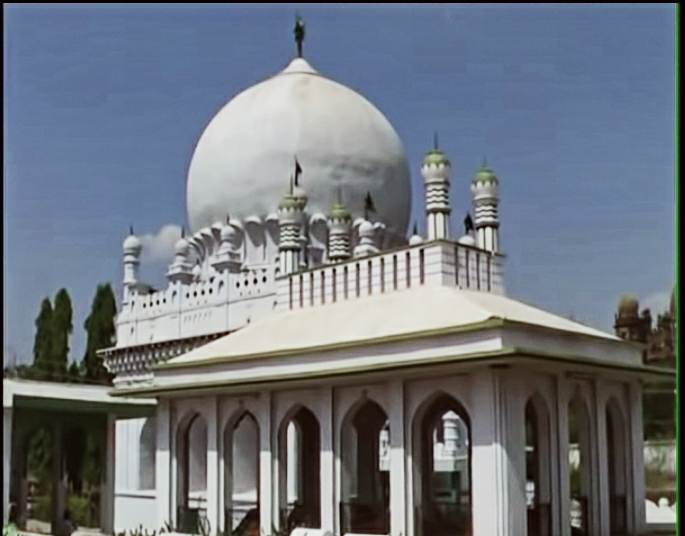
Shrine of Hashim Peer Dastagir

Humayun (d. 1556) received initiation (bay’ah) into the tariqa from Muhammad Ghawth. The successors and descendants of Shaykh Wajih al-Din ‘Alavi Gujarati (d. 1589) received lavish grants from Jahangir (d. 1627) when he visited Ahmadabad. The dargah (shrine) of Wajihuddin Alvi was visited by Jahangir in the year 1618, when Alvi's grandson Shaikh Haider was the sajjadanashin (custodian) of the shrine.

== Philosophy ==
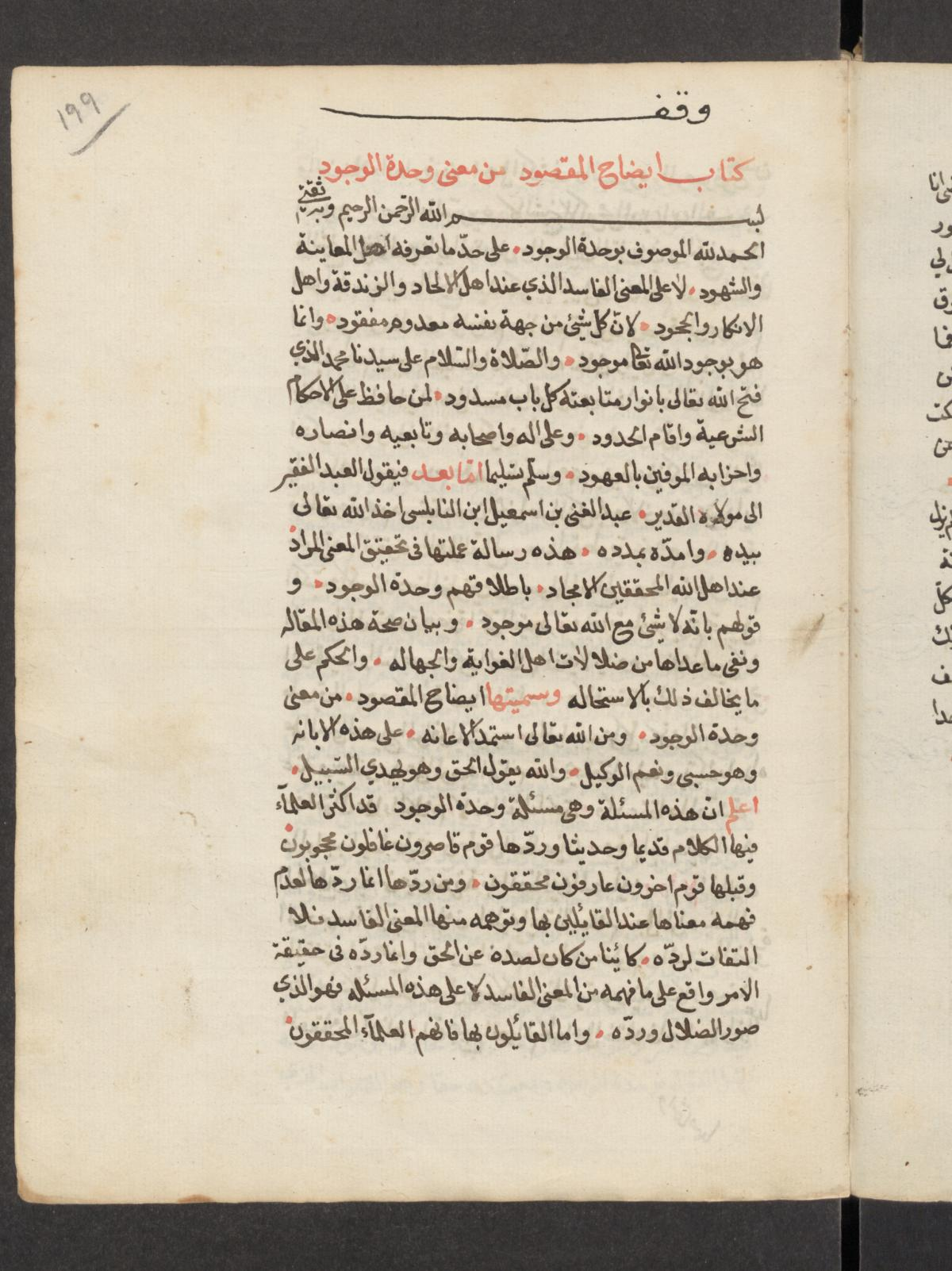
First page of a manuscript of Īḍāḥ al-maqṣūd min maʿnā waḥdat al-wujūd, an Arabic treatise by Abd al-Ghani al-Nabulusi (d. 1731) on wahdat al-wujūd. The manuscript dates from the 18th century and is located in the Staatsbibliothek zu Berlin.

The central philosophy of the Qadri Shattari order is Wahdat al-wujūd. The idea that their knowledge is "secret" or "confidential" is a belief within the order.

Bahauddin Ansari, a Qadri Shattari Sufi discoursed on the t̤ar̄iqa of the Qadri Shattari order that included practicing tauba (repentance/abstinence from anything that takes focus away from god), zuhd (being given to religious exercises/abstaining from desires of this world), tawakkul (resignation to the Divine will), qan̄‘at (contentment/abstinence from the desires of the lower soul), ‘uzlat (resignation and being away from people/self-seclusion), tawajjuh-il̄h All̄h (focus towards God and ending all the desires), sabr (patience), rị̄’za-i-il̄ahi (endeavouring to please God), and performing z̠ikr (with sole focus on Allah].

Shah Sharaf (d. 1724 A.D.) was initiated into Sufism by Muhammad Fazil Qadri Shattari of the Qadri Shattari traditions from Lahore. He was the fellow disciple of Muhammad Raza Qadri Shattari Lahori. Sharaf believed that one has to merge his identity into oneness with god for spiritual enlightenment. Sharaf emphasized killing one's ego (nafs) for the tajalli-e-ilahi (vision of god). Sharaf also believed in the philosophy of mutu qabla-anta mutu (die before you die), which can be seen in his writings about drinking the "elixir of life" after surviving death in the world.

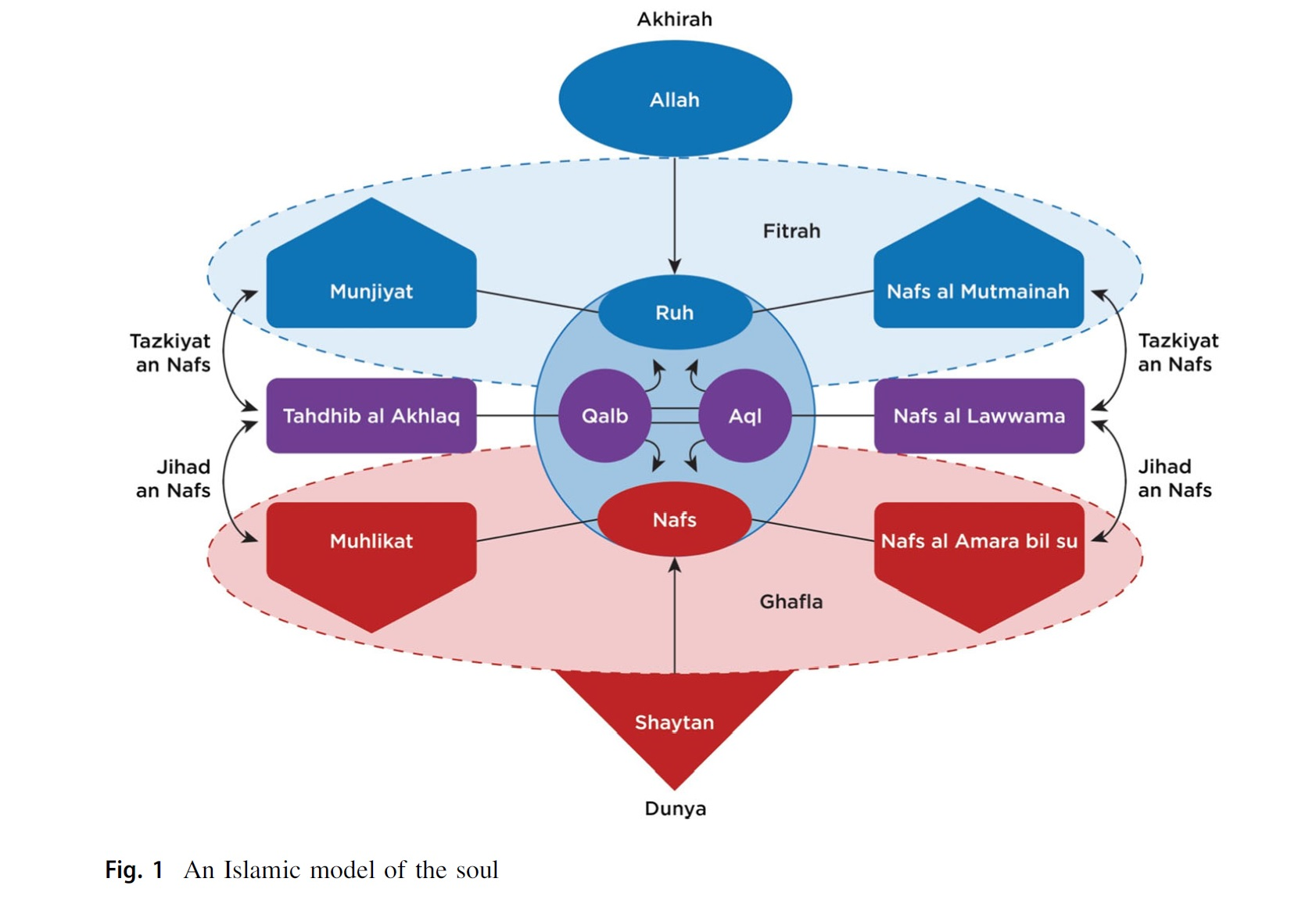
A visual rendition of the Islamic model of the soul showing the position of "nafs" relative to other concepts, based on a consensus of 18 surveyed academic and religious experts

== Elements of Hindu mysticism ==
According to political scientist Ishtiaq Ahmed, the Qadri Shattari Sufi tradition sought synthesis between Hindu and Muslim mysticism.

=== Bahauddin Ansari Qadiri Shattari ===
Bahauddin Ansari Qadri Shattari, also known as Langot Band Ansari, was a prominent figure of this Sufi order and the author of Risala-e-Shattariya. The elements of Hindu mysticism in this Muslim Sunni Sufi order is explained by Carl W. Ernst in his work, "Yoga and the 'Pure Muhammadi Path' of Muhammad Nasir 'Andalib", by mentioning Risala-yi Shattariyya by the Qadiri-Shattari Sufi Baha’ al-Din al-Ansari (d. 1515–16). Sufi Bahauddin very explicitly appropriated yoga teachings, including those related to chakras, yoga postures, pranayama (breath control), and mantras, presenting them in a highly organized way in chapter four of this treatise (Ernst and Khodamoradi 2018). In this work, Ansari suggested a practice of visualization that should be carried out along with a certain posture that, in his point of view, has the benefit and quality of all of the eighty-four postures of yoga. Inayat Shah Qadiri Shattari was well versed in different methods to attain nijat (salvation) which were advocated by ancient Hindu mystics. Bulleh Shah was also influenced by yogic practices such as trikuti and anahat shabd.

Anahata chakra with peaked circle around a six-pointed star

== Influence on Indo-Pakistani culture ==
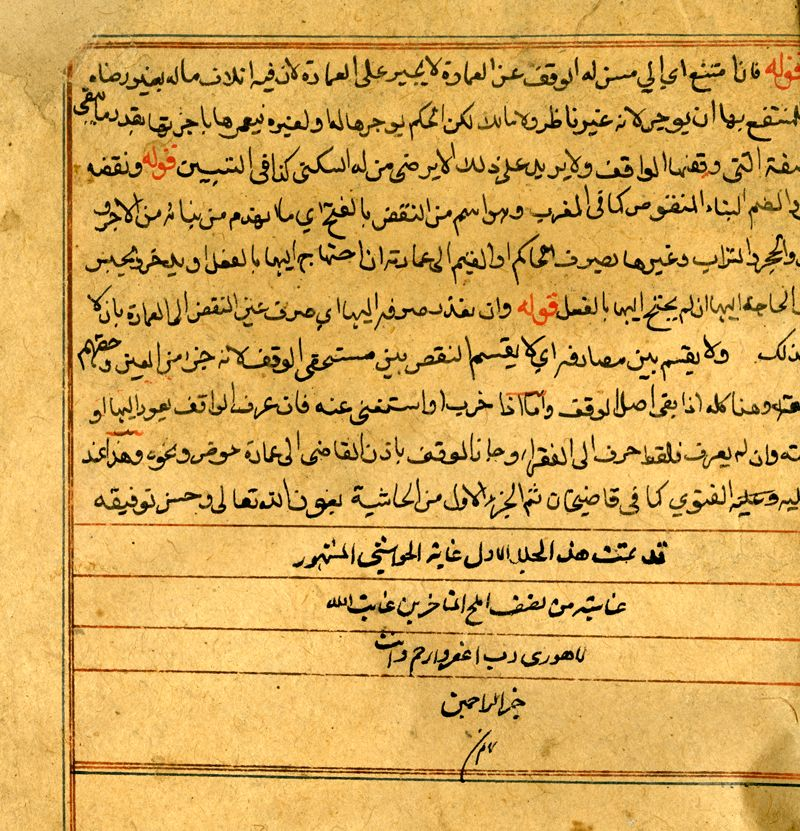
Manuscript containing an autograph of Shah Inayat Qadri, dated to 1127 A.H. (circa 1715 C.E.)

Shah Inayat Qadri Shattari (d. 1728) was a Sufi practitioner and philosopher who was a prominent Punjabi Sufi poet in the Qadri Shattari tradition. He predominantly composed in Persian and Punjabi languages. He was the spiritual guide of Punjabi poets Bulleh Shah and Waris Shah (d.1798). His notable works include Dastur-ul-Amal Islah-ul-Amal, Lata’if-e-Ghaibiya, and Isharat-ul-Talibin.

Bulleh Shah (d. 1757), a Punjabi Sufi poet and a Qadri Shattari saint, lived during the decline of Mughal rule under Muhammad Shah. His poetry, influenced by the concept of Waḥdat al-wujūd (Unity of Existence), reflected Sufi teachings on the relationship between Murshid (master) and Murid (disciple). Bulleh Shah also played a key role in mediating peace between Muslims and Sikhs during a conflict, symbolising harmony in Punjab.

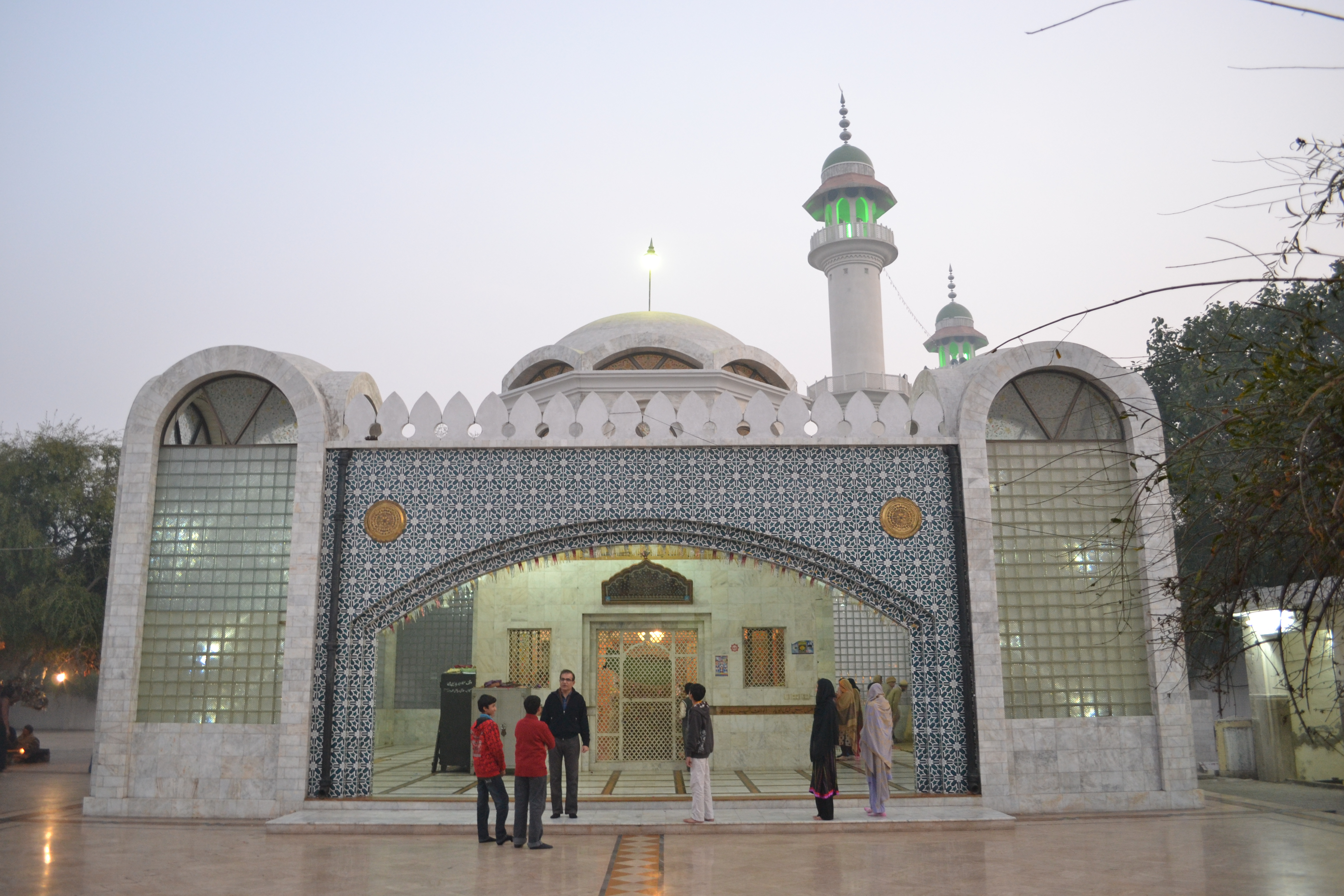
The tomb of Bulleh Shah in Kasur, Pakistan

Muhammad Raza Shattari Qadri another prominent Qadri Shattari saint from Lahore who lived during the reign of Aurangzeb wrote a number of important works in Persian. The two most influential of them are Adab-i-muridi and Irshad-ul-Ashiqin.

Sharaf (d. 1724 A.D.) used metaphors and similes to convey his message of mysticism in his writings. Sharaf's writings include ohras, kafis and a shurutnama.

== Modern era ==
The Qadri Shattari order has lately been headed by Sayyad Mushtaque Husain Mushtaq Hussain Ali Mast Qadri, who illustrates how Shattar's spiritual legacy is still relevant in the contemporary age. The mausoleum of Wali Baba in Kondhali, Maharashtra, is one of the hubs of this prevailing tradition. The Urs festival is celebrated annually at the Dargah of Wajihuddin Alvi in Ahmedabad.

In the research published by Universitas Islam Negeri Fatmawati Sukarno Bengkulu, the Indonesian scholar, Seprodi Yodistira, considers the Qadri Shattari Sufi order as a prominent branch of the Shattari Sufi order practiced in India and Pakistan. They further stated that important Sufis of this order include Ghaus Gwaliori, Hashim Peer Dastagir, and Sufi Sarmast Ali Shah Qalandar. Other famous Sufis of this order include Muhammad Siddique Qadri Shattari, Ghani Qadri Shattari, and Wali Qadri Shattari. Yodistira also mentioned the current leadership of Sayyad Mushtaq Hussain Ali Mast Qadri Shattari.

=== Institute of Sufi Studies ===
The Qadri Shattari Institute of Sufi Studies, also known as the Qadri Shattari Silsila’s online platform, is a contemporary research initiative associated with the Qadri Shattari Sufi order, presenting itself as an international forum for the study of Sufism.

Gary R. Bunt, professor of Islamic Studies at the University of Wales, mentions the Qadri Shattari Silsila’s online platform (qadrishattari.xyz) in his book Islamic Algorithms: Online Influence in the Muslim Metaverse, in the context of research on the online articulation of mystical expression within Sufism.

Peer-reviewed academic works have cited research published by the Institute, indicating emerging scholarly interest in its engagement with Sufism.

Alain Elkann, an Italian novelist and visiting professor at the University of Pennsylvania, and other academics have cited qadrishattari.xyz in non-peer-reviewed, academic-adjacent contexts.

One of its research projects was used as a resource guide for the 2025 SSC exam at Aga Khan University.

== Notable sufis ==
- Muhammad Ghawth
- Wajihuddin Alvi
- Sayyedna Hashim Peer Dastagir
- Shah Inayat Qadiri
- Bulleh Shah
- Badiuddin Zia-ul-Haq Qadri Shattari
- Shaikh Bahauddin Ansari Shuttari Qadri.

== See also ==
- Sufism in India
- Sufism in Pakistan
