= Institute of Sufi Studies =

Research initiative of the Qadri Shattari order

The Qadri Shattari Institute of Sufi Studies also known as Qadri Shattari Silsila's Online Platform or simply Institute of Sufi Studies is the modern research initiative of the Qadri Shattari Sufi order as an international scholarly forum to promote academic research on Sufism.

Gary R. Bunt, the professor of Islamic Studies at the University of Wales, in his book Islamic Algorithms: Online Influence in the Muslim Metaverse, mentioned Qadri Shattari Silsila's Online Platform (qadrishattari.xyz) for "the role of mystical expression (under the 'Sufi' banner), and its articulation online has also formed part of research projects."

The Institute’s scholarly contributions have achieved formal recognition within national educational frameworks. Specifically, the Aga Khan University Examination Board (AKU-EB) designated the Institute's research projects as official Teaching and Learning Resources for the 2025 Secondary School Certificate (SSC) Islamiyat curriculum.

Multiple peer-reviewed and academic studies have cited research published by the Institute, indicating its academic impact.

Italian novelist and visiting professor at the University of Pennsylvania, Alain Elkann along with other academicians, have used qadrishattari.xyz in other academically adjacent settings.
