= Jali =

Architectural decoration in Indian architecture

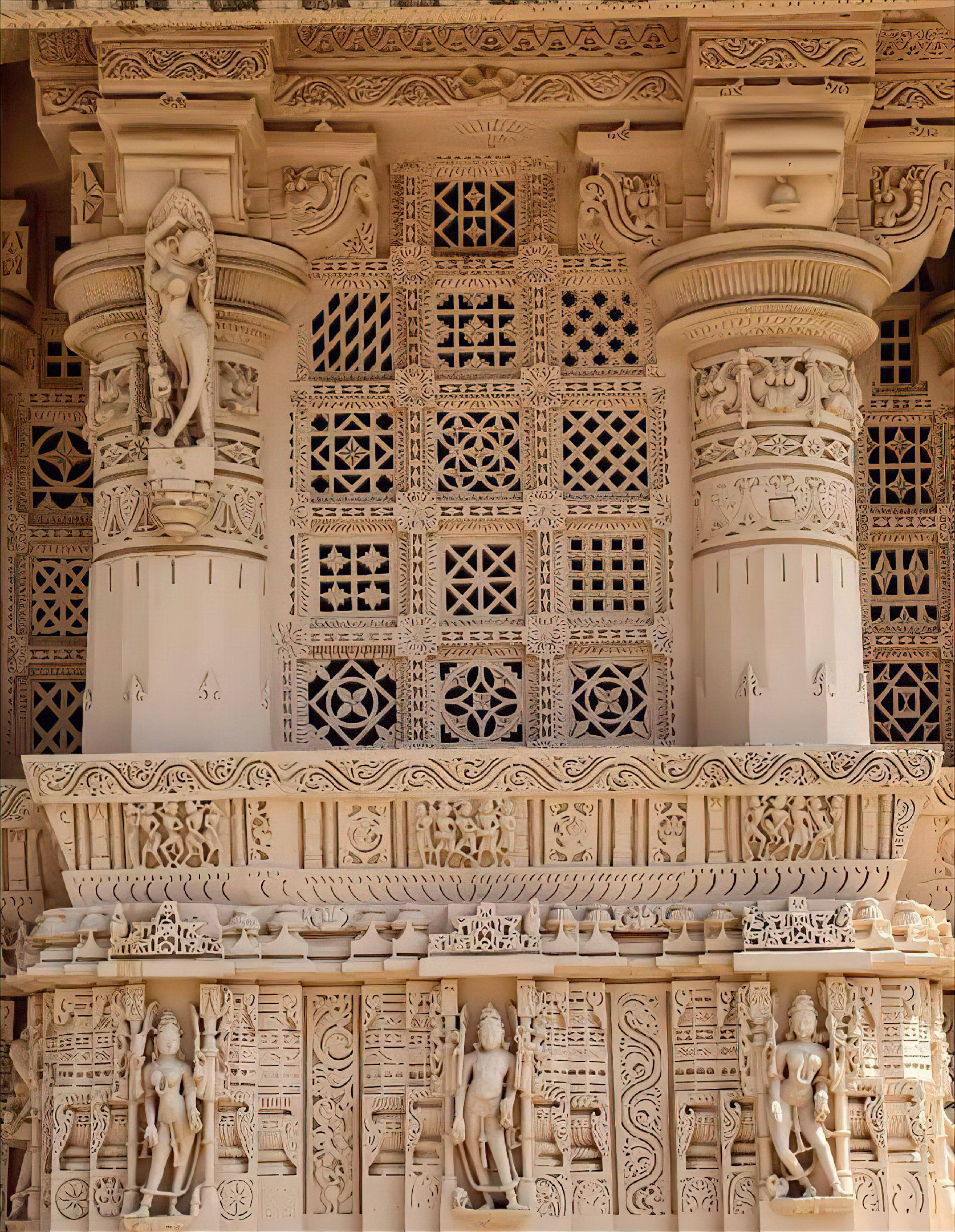
Jali at Ajitnath Jain Temple, 11th-century Gujarat

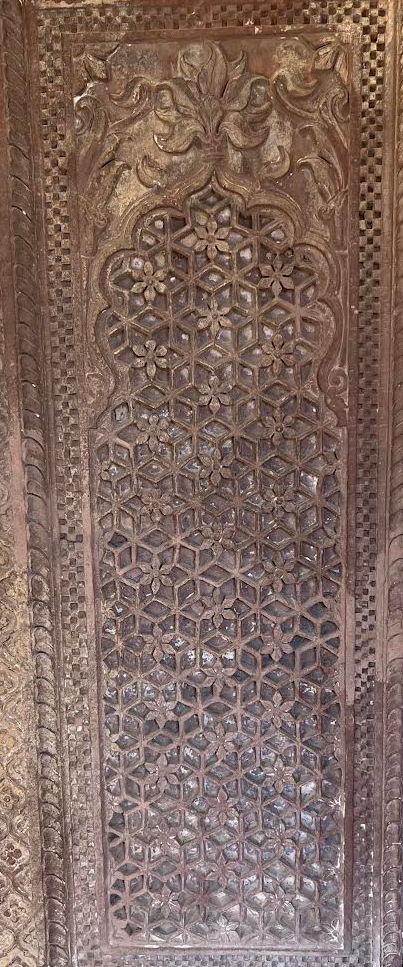
A jali is typically open, but this example of a 17th-century jali from the last Mughal period was owned by a wealthy merchant and probably placed with the external portal. Basically, the impression is friendly and inviting as the inside of the palace, but secure to outside world. The iris pattern at the top is a departure from the earlier geometry and indicates a Persian influence.

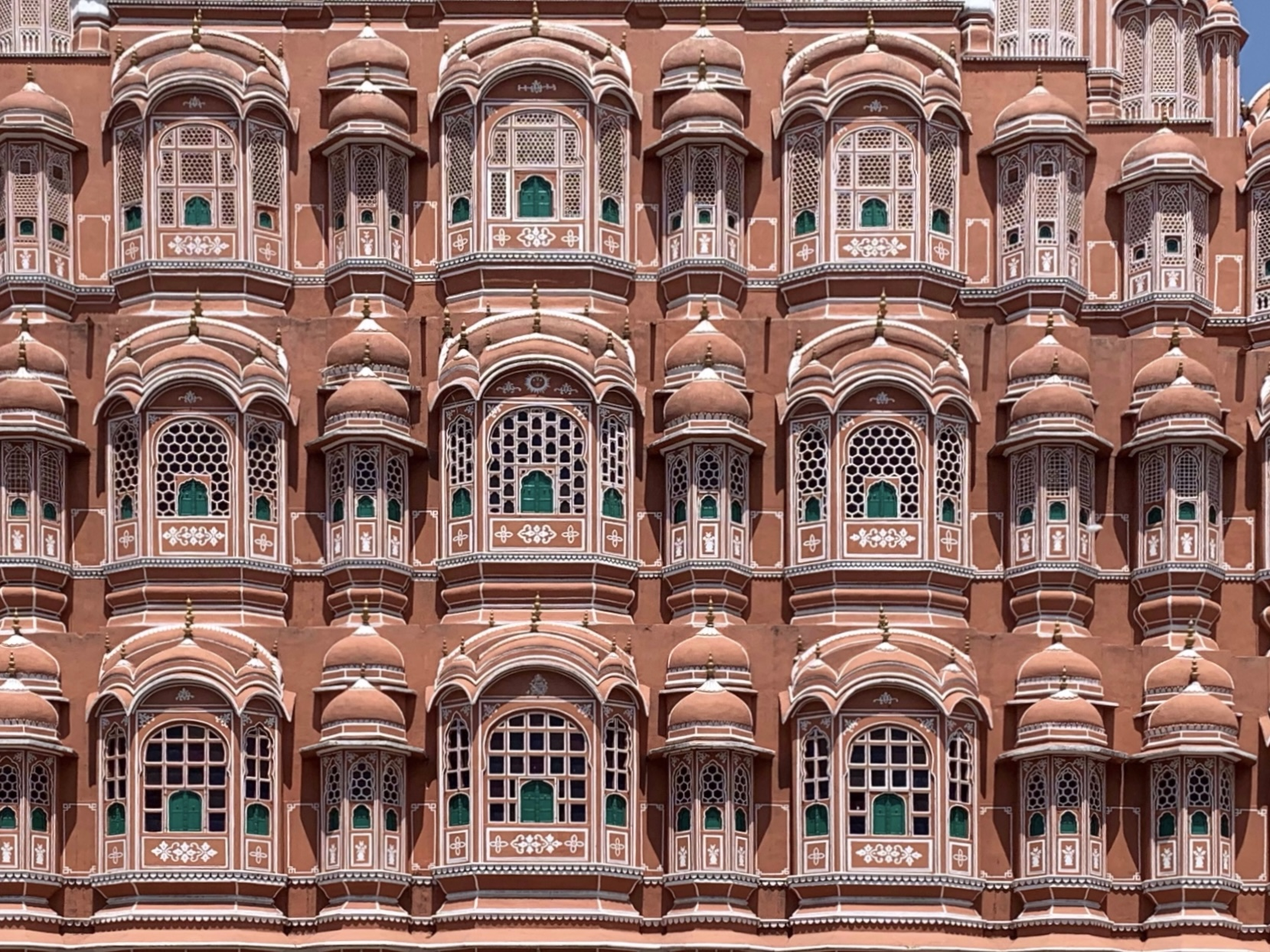
Jali panels in Rajput style, Hawa Mahal, Jaipur

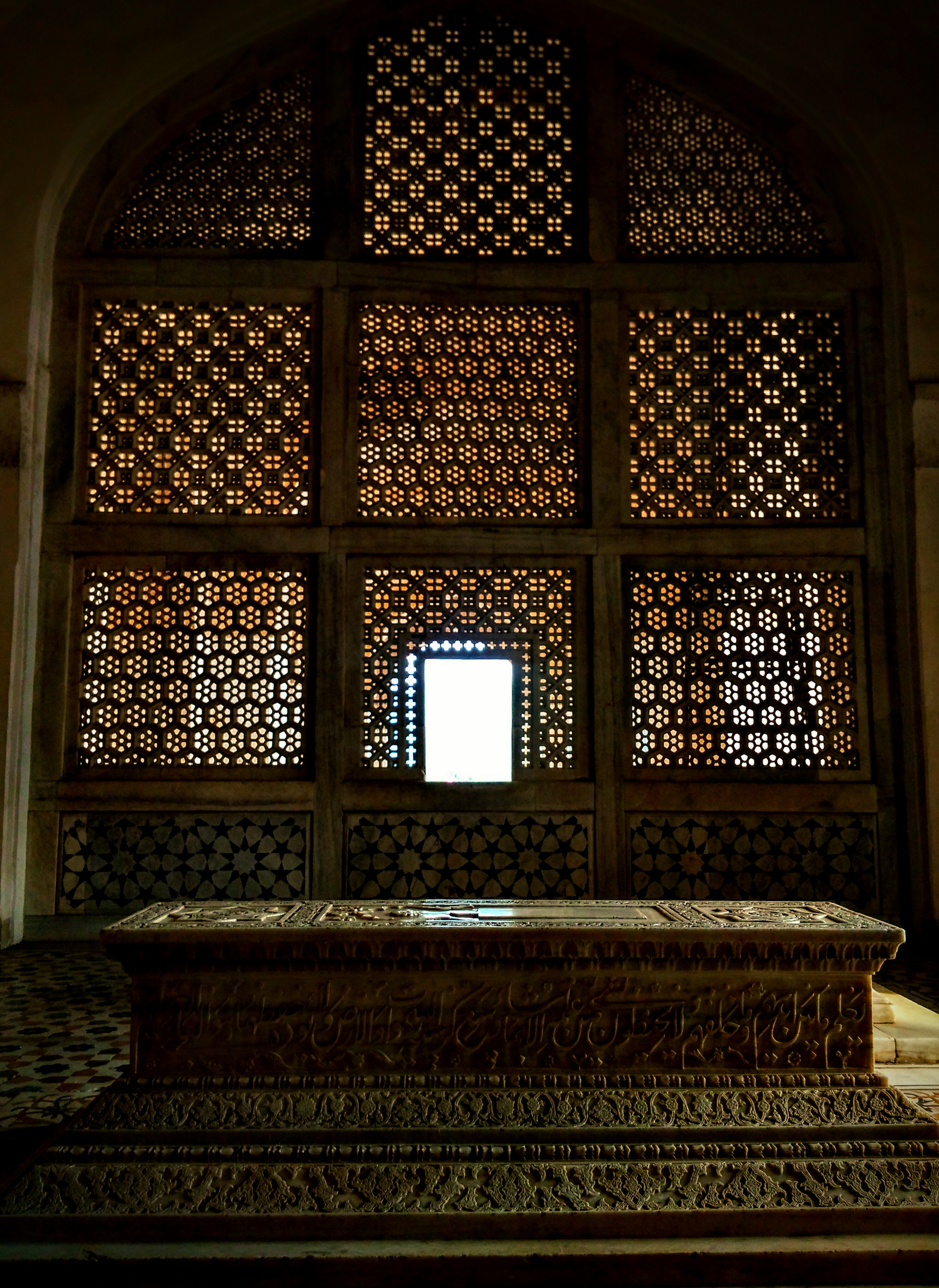
Jali screens in the tomb of Akbar the Great near Agra, India

A jali or jaali (jālī, meaning "net") is a perforated stone or latticed screen, usually with an ornamental pattern constructed through the use of calligraphy, geometry or natural patterns. This form of architectural decoration is common in Indo-Islamic architecture and more generally in Indian architecture. It is closely related to mashrabiya in Islamic architecture.

According to Yatin Pandya, the jali allows light and air in while minimizing the sun and the rain, as well as providing cooling through passive ventilation. The holes are nearly the same width or smaller than the thickness of the stone, thus providing structural strength. It has been observed that humid areas like Kerala and Konkan have larger holes with overall lower opacity compared with the dry climate regions of Gujarat and Rajasthan.

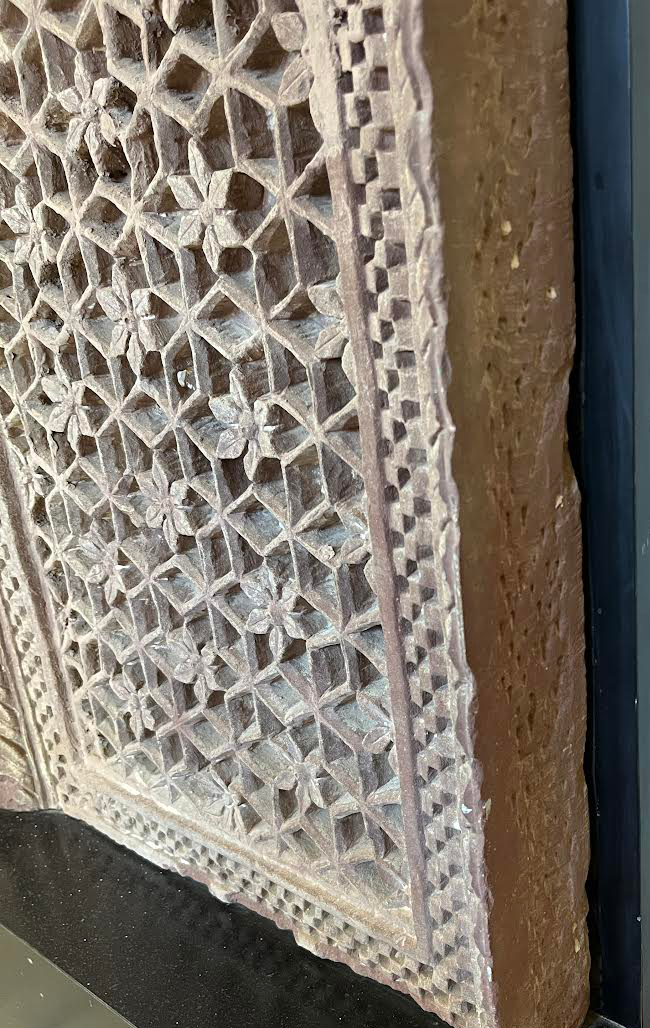
Jalis were architectural elements and designed to interlock with repeated patterns. This detail shows the relative thickness and sandstone carving (late 17th-century Mughal origin).

With the widespread use of glass in the late 19th century, and compactness of the residential areas in modern India, jalis became less frequent for privacy and security matters. In the 21st century, it has gained popularity again as a low-energy building solution for the environmental footprint of energy use by buildings.

== History ==
The earliest sanctuaries in India, dedicated to Buddhism, Jainism and Hinduism, were often dimly lit and confined, resembling natural caves. Worshippers gathered in front of the sanctuaries' doorways for prayers and offerings. To control the harsh daylight entering the temples, screens known as jalis were used to filter and soften the light, encouraging devotion and directing attention to the sacred images. The tradition of using jalis persisted in later Indian architecture, including Hindu and Jain temples. Over time, the designs of jalis evolved, incorporating geometric and naturalistic patterns. With the advent of Islamic architecture in Gujarat, the use of jalis expanded and became a prominent feature in mosques and tombs, following the same symbolic importance of light in Islam. The adoption of jalis in Islamic buildings shows a fusion of architectural styles and motifs from Hindu, Jain, and Islamic traditions, largely influenced by the guilds of masons working for patrons across different cultural backgrounds.

Early jali work with multiple geometric shapes was built by carving into stone, in geometric patterns (first appearing in the Alai Darwaza of 1305 at Delhi beside the Qutub Minar); later on, the Mughals used very finely carved plant-based designs (as at the Taj Mahal). They also often added pietra dura inlay to the surrounds using marble and semi-precious stones.

In the Gwalior Fort near the Urwahi gate, there is a 17-line inscription dated Samvat 1553 mentioning names of some craftsmen and their creations. One of them is Khedu, who was an expert in Gwaliyai jhilmili (jali screens crafted in the Gwalior style). The Mughal period tomb of Muhammad Ghaus, built in 1565 AD at Gwalior, is remarkable for its stone jalis. Many of Gwalior's 19th-century houses used stone jalis. Jalis are used extensively in Gwalior's Usha Kiran Palace Hotel, formerly Scindia's guest house.

== Museum collections ==
Some of the jalis are in major museums in the U.S. and Europe. These include the Indianapolis Museum of Art, the Metropolitan Museum of Art and the Victoria and Albert Museum.

== Illustrations ==
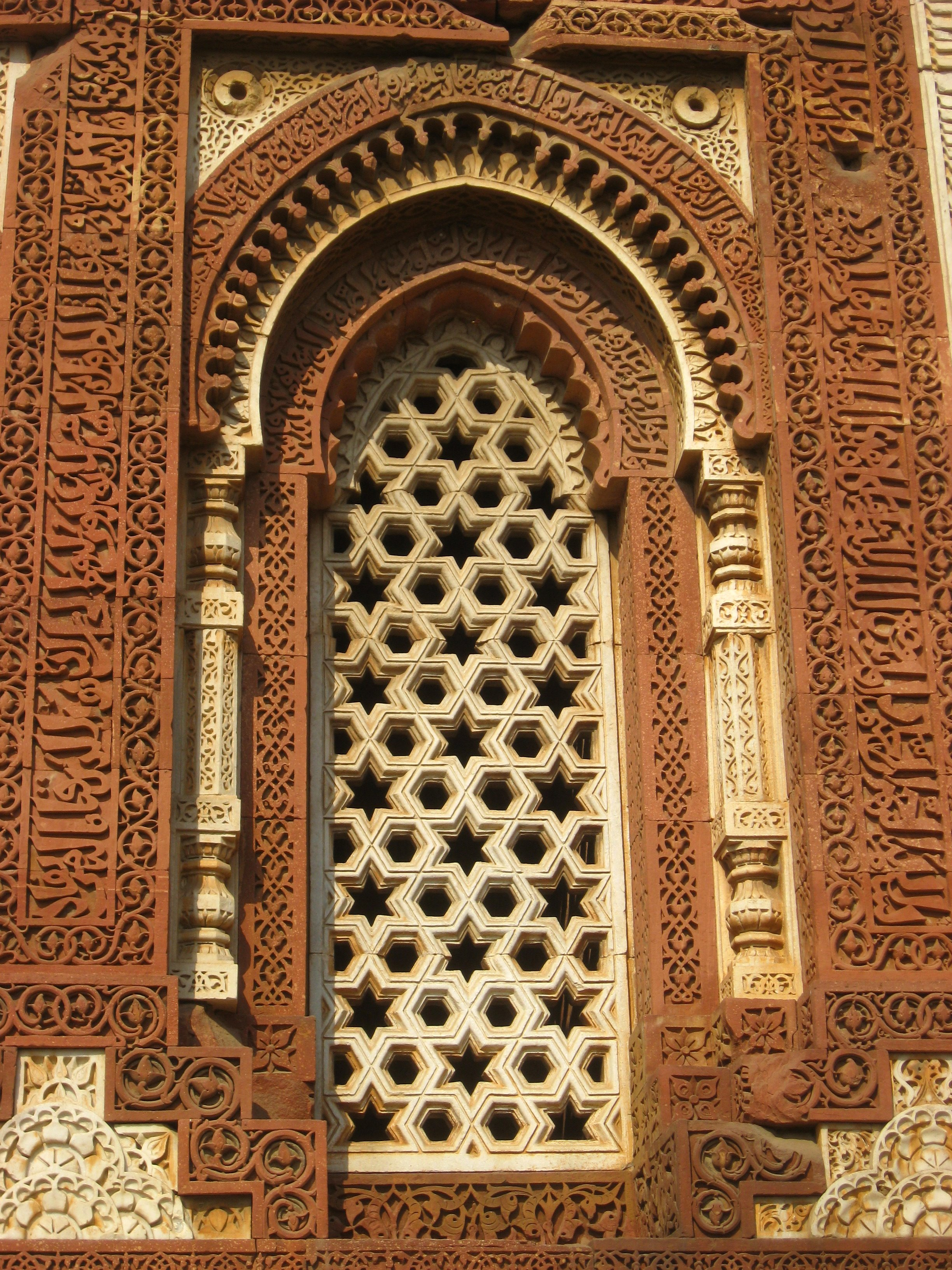
Window at Alai Darwaza, Qutb complex

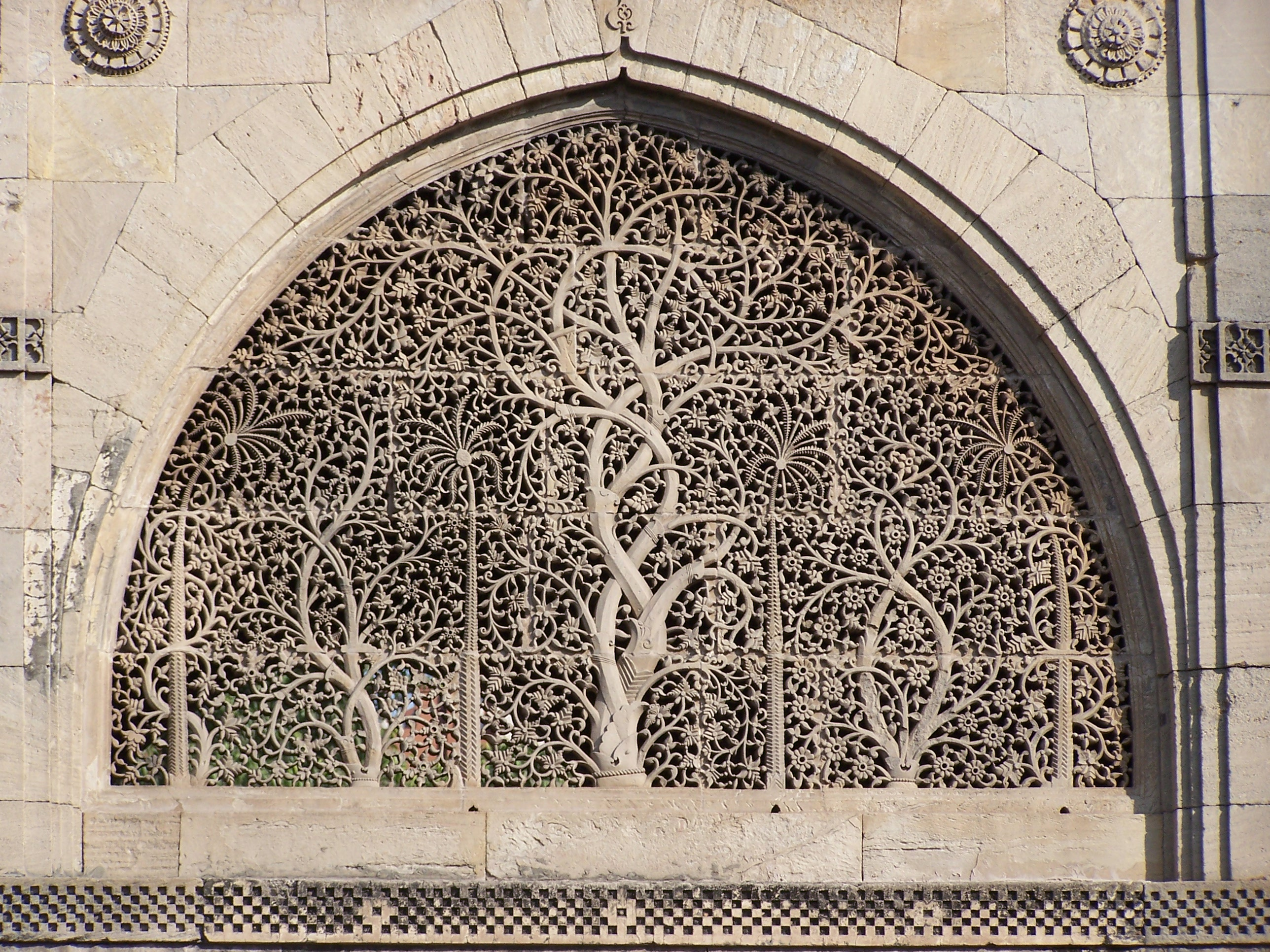
Jali in Sidi Saiyyed mosque in Ahmedabad, exhibiting the traditional Indian tree of life motif

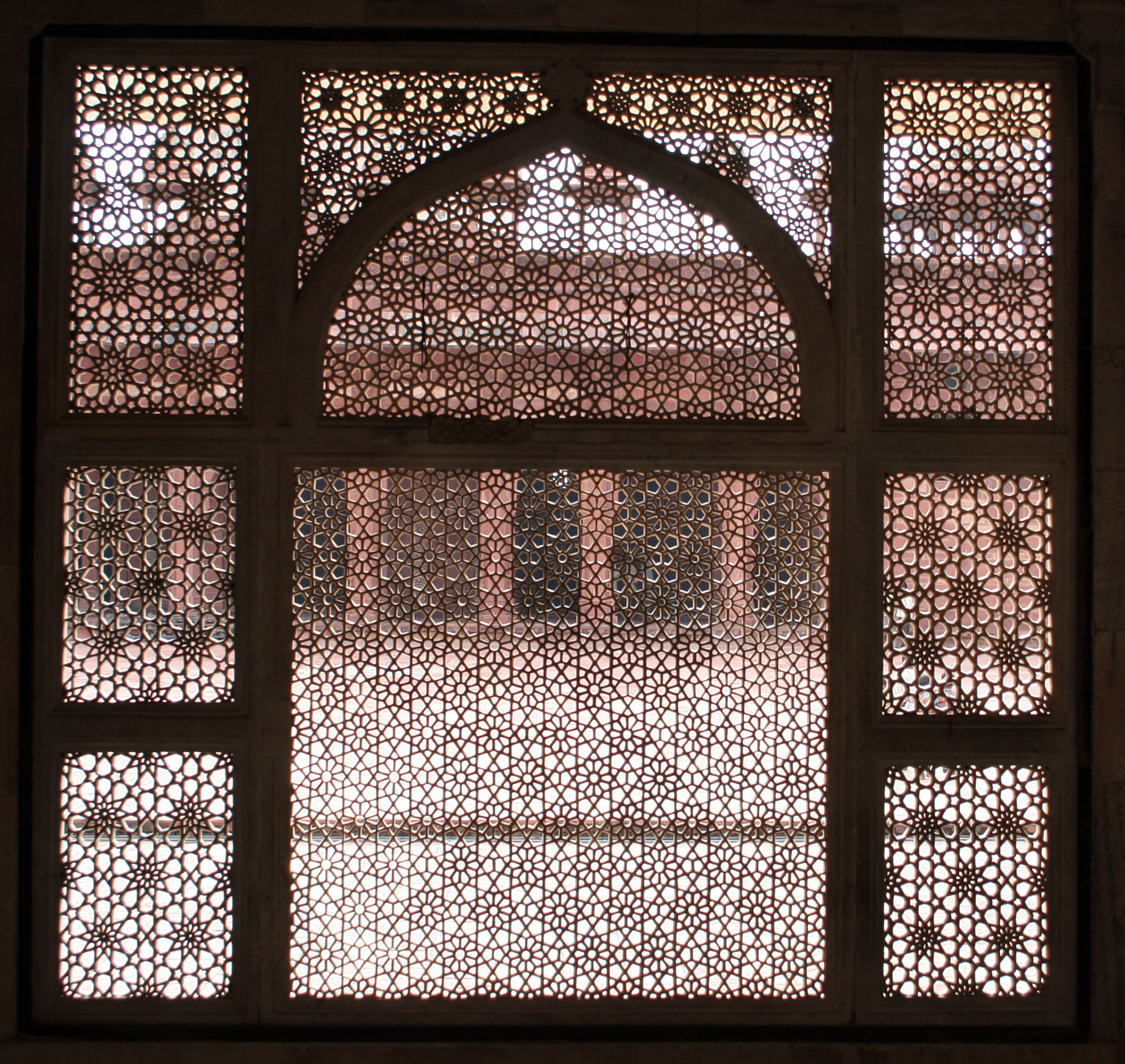
Jali at Tomb of Salim Chishti in Fatehpur Sikri, showing Islamic geometric patterns developed in Western Asia

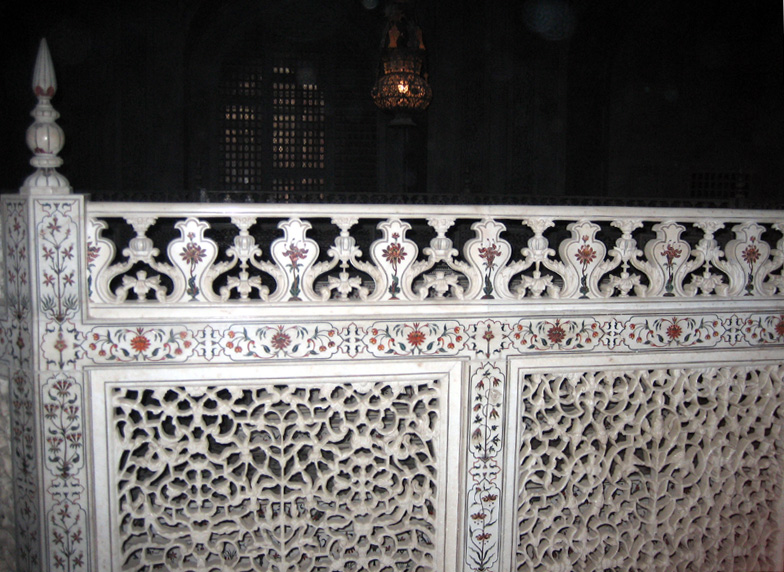
Details of marble jali screens around royal cenotaphs, Taj Mahal

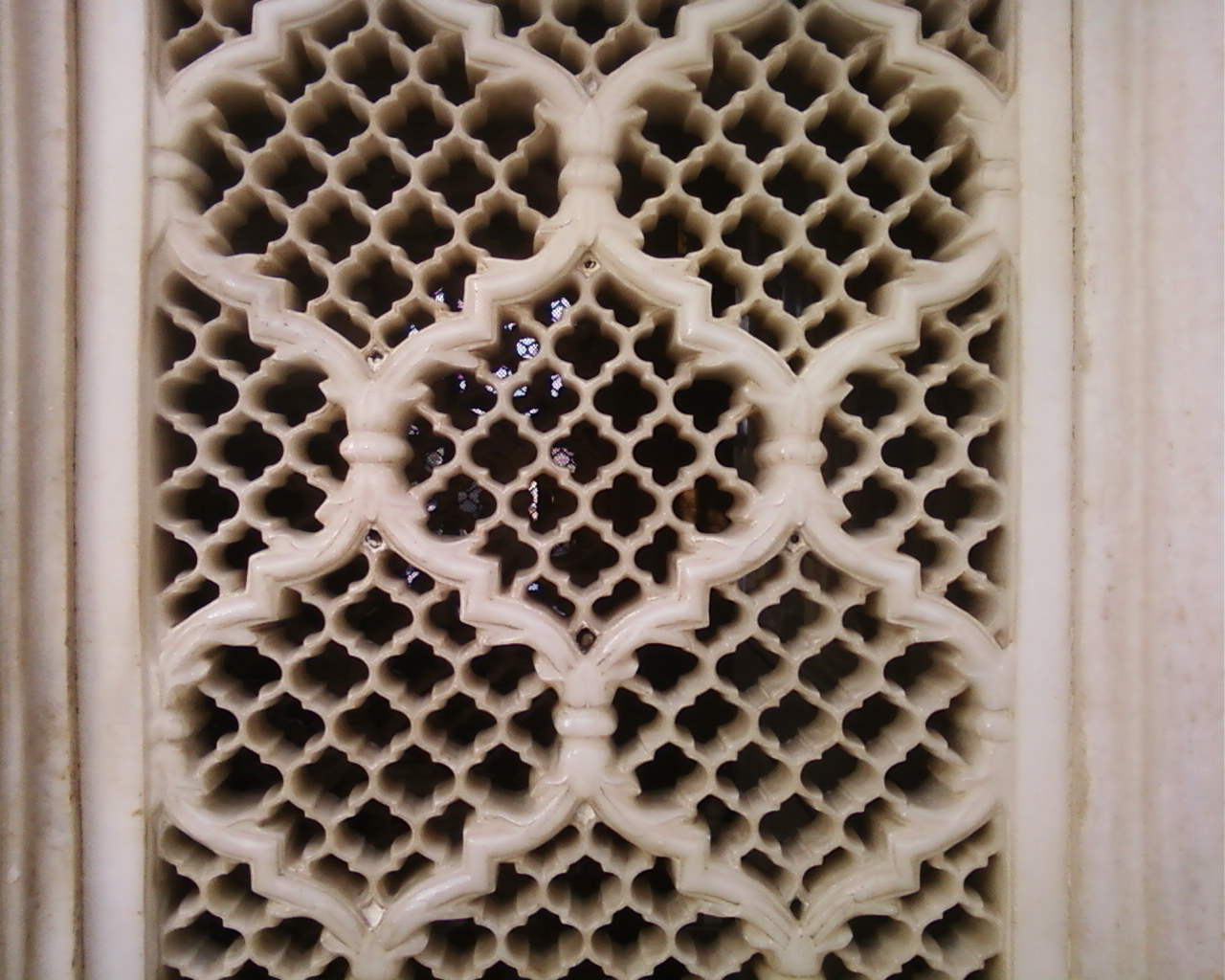
Jali at Bibi Ka Maqbara in Aurangabad, with typical Indian motifs

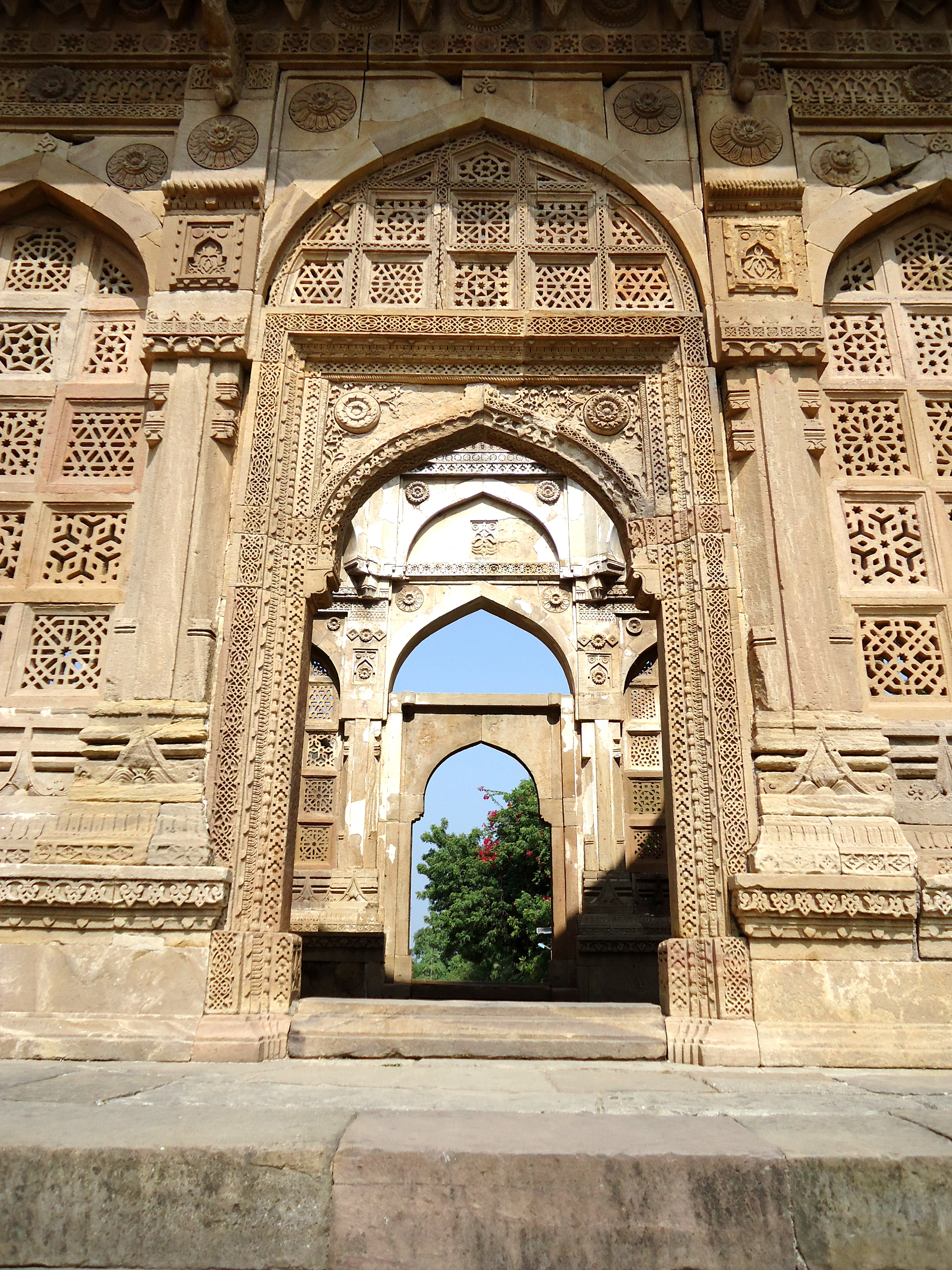
Jali at Champaner, utilizing traditional Indian geometric patterns and Islamic geometry

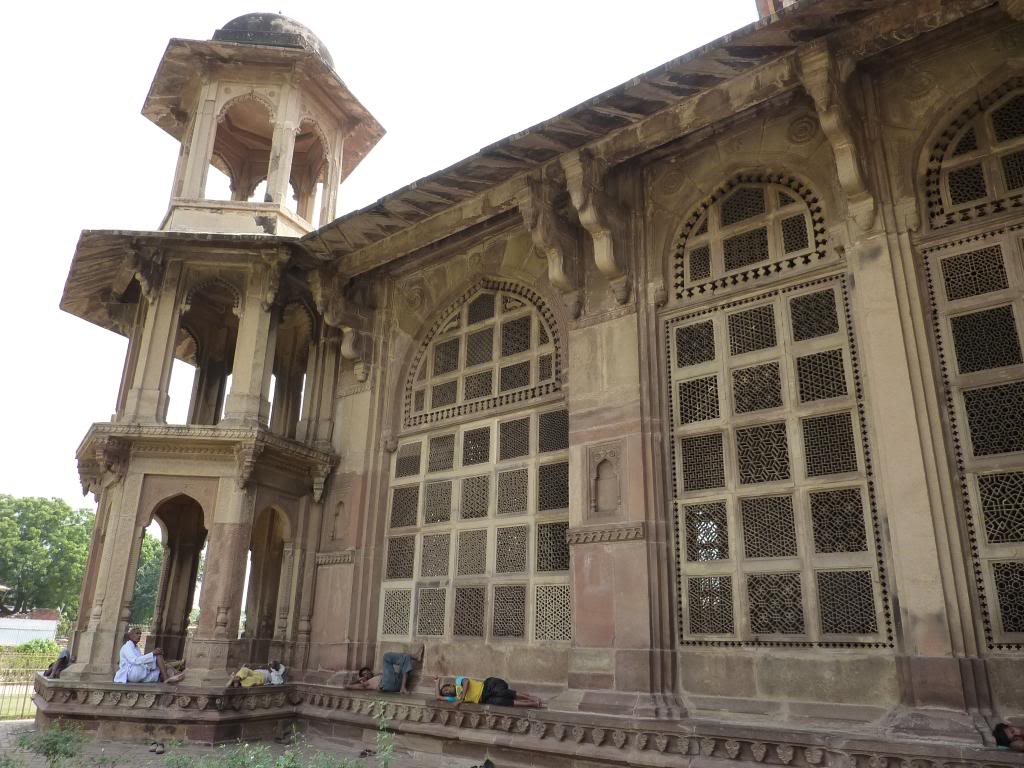
Jalis in Mohammad Gaus Tomb in Gwalior

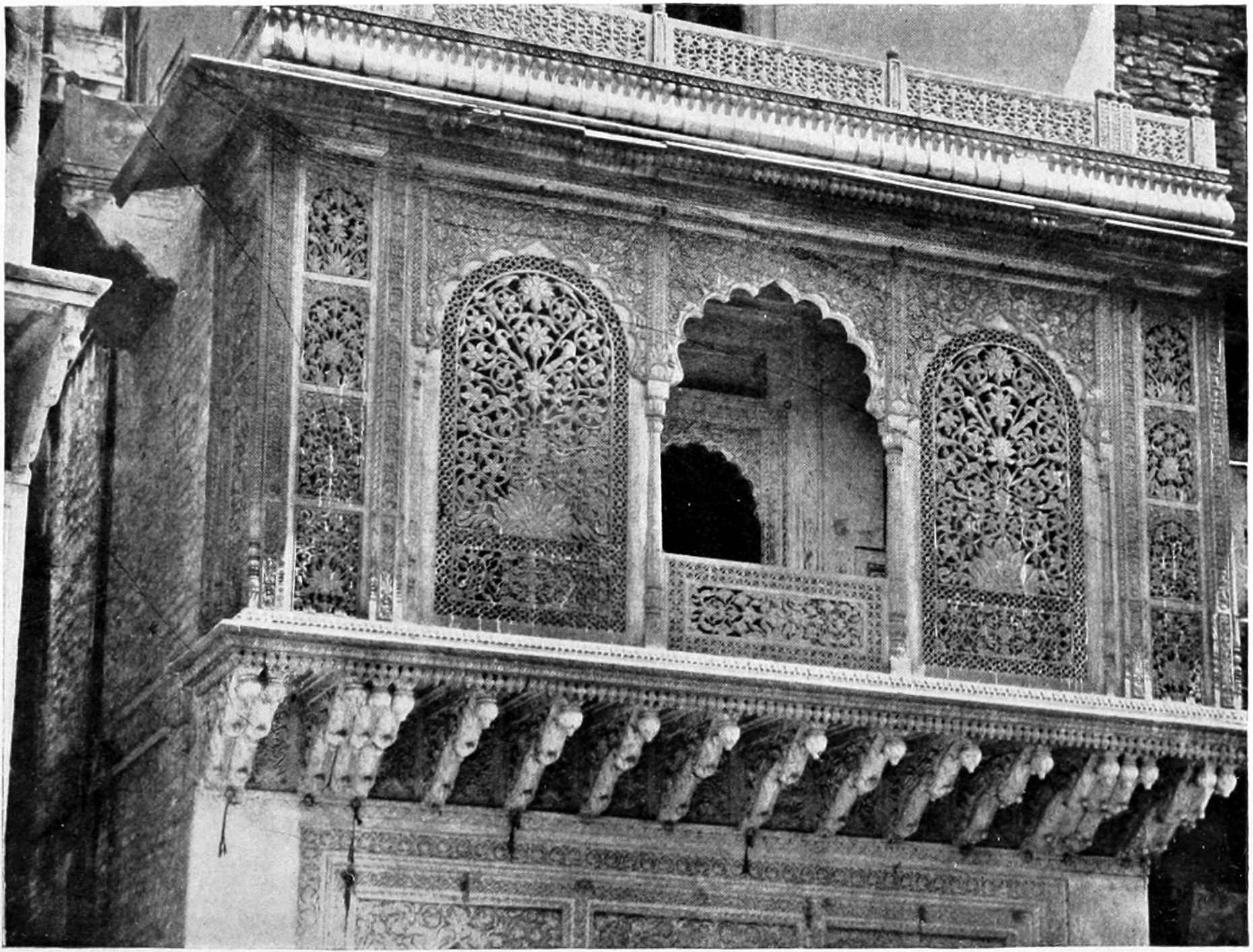
19th-century house in Gwalior, using stone jalis

== See also ==
- Girih
- Jharokha
- Openwork
- Venturi effect
