= Shah Inayat Qadiri =

Punjabi Sufi saint (1643–1728)

Shah Inayat Qadri
- شاہ عنایت قادری
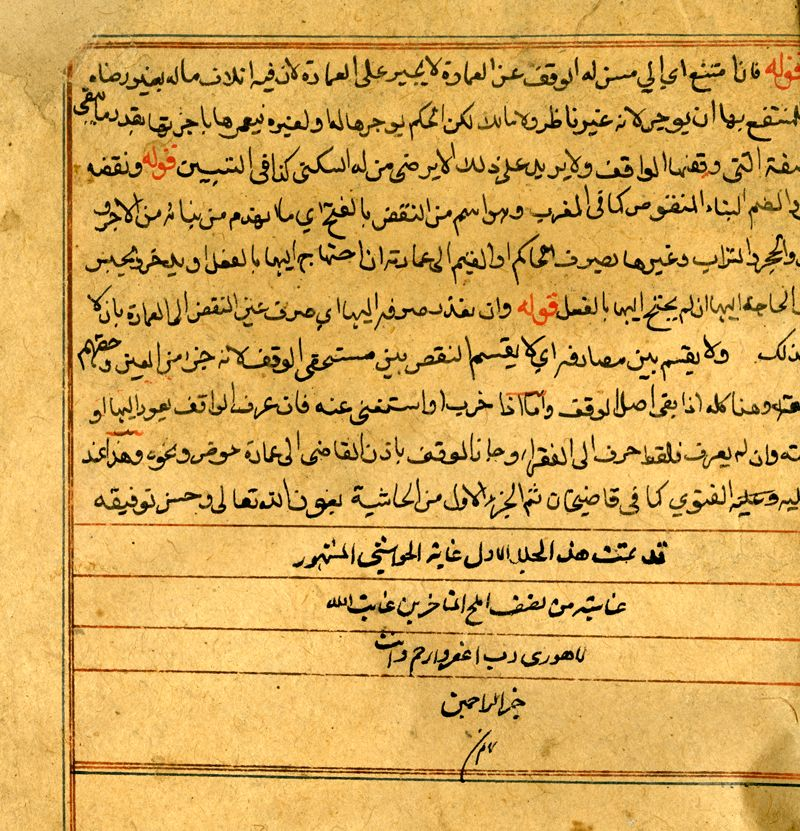
- Manuscript containing an autograph of Shah Inayat Qadri, dated to 1127 A.H. (circa 1715 C.E.)

Personal life
- Born: c. 1643 Kasur, Punjab, Mughal Empire (present-day Punjab, Pakistan)
- Died: c. 1728 (aged 84 or 85) Lahore, Lahore Subah, Mughal Empire (present-day Punjab, Pakistan)
- Resting place: Mozang Chungi, Lahore
- Main interests: Tassawuf; Ishq; Philosophy; Divine love

Religious life
- Religion: Islam
- Philosophy: Sufism
- Tariqa: Qadri Shattari

Muslim leader
- Influenced by: Baba Farid
- Influenced: Bulleh Shah Waris Shah

Shah Inayat Qadri (Note: Punjabi: شاہ عنایت قادری, also romanized as Enayat Shah) (Punjabi: [ʃaːɦ ɪnaː'jət qaːdɾi]; c. 1643 – 1728) was a Punjabi Muslim Sufi scholar, saint and philosopher of the Qadri Shattari silsila (lineage). He mostly wrote his philosophical works in Persian. Shah Inayat Qadiri is famous as the spiritual guide of the universal Punjabi poets Bulleh Shah and Waris Shah.

== Name ==
Baba is an honorific term used as a sign of respect. It is a term similar to "father" or "wise old man". Shah is another honorific referring to a king. Inayat is an Islamic first name. Qadiri and Shatari are Islamic surname for the members of the Qadiriyya and Shattariyya tariqahs, which are Sufi mystical order.

== Life ==
=== Early life and education ===
Shah Inayat was born in Kasur in 1643 (circa), into a Punjabi Muslim family belonging to the Arain tribe.

He was a Sufi scholar and activist associated with the Qadiri-Shattari silsila (lineage). Shah Inayat was the son of Mawlawi Pir Mohammad of Kasur, who was an Imam.

=== Shah Inayat and his disciples ===
He was the student of Shah Raza and teacher of Bulleh Shah and Waris Shah.

=== Persecution and migration ===
He used to work in Kasur, but because of the animosity of the city's ruler, Nawab Hussain Khan, he was forced to migrate to Lahore.

== Work ==
Shah Inayat is remembered as a preacher, a religious scholar, a philosopher and a saint. A brief biographical note on him was published in 1984 in Lahore. Shah Inayat was a scholar of mysticism. He wrote mostly in Persian and Punjabi. His works include:

- Dasturul Amal
- Islahul Amal
- Lataif-e-Ghaibya
- Ishartul Taliban

== See also ==
- List of Sufi saints
