= Mohammed Ghous Mosque =

Mosque in Ahmedabad, Gujarat, India

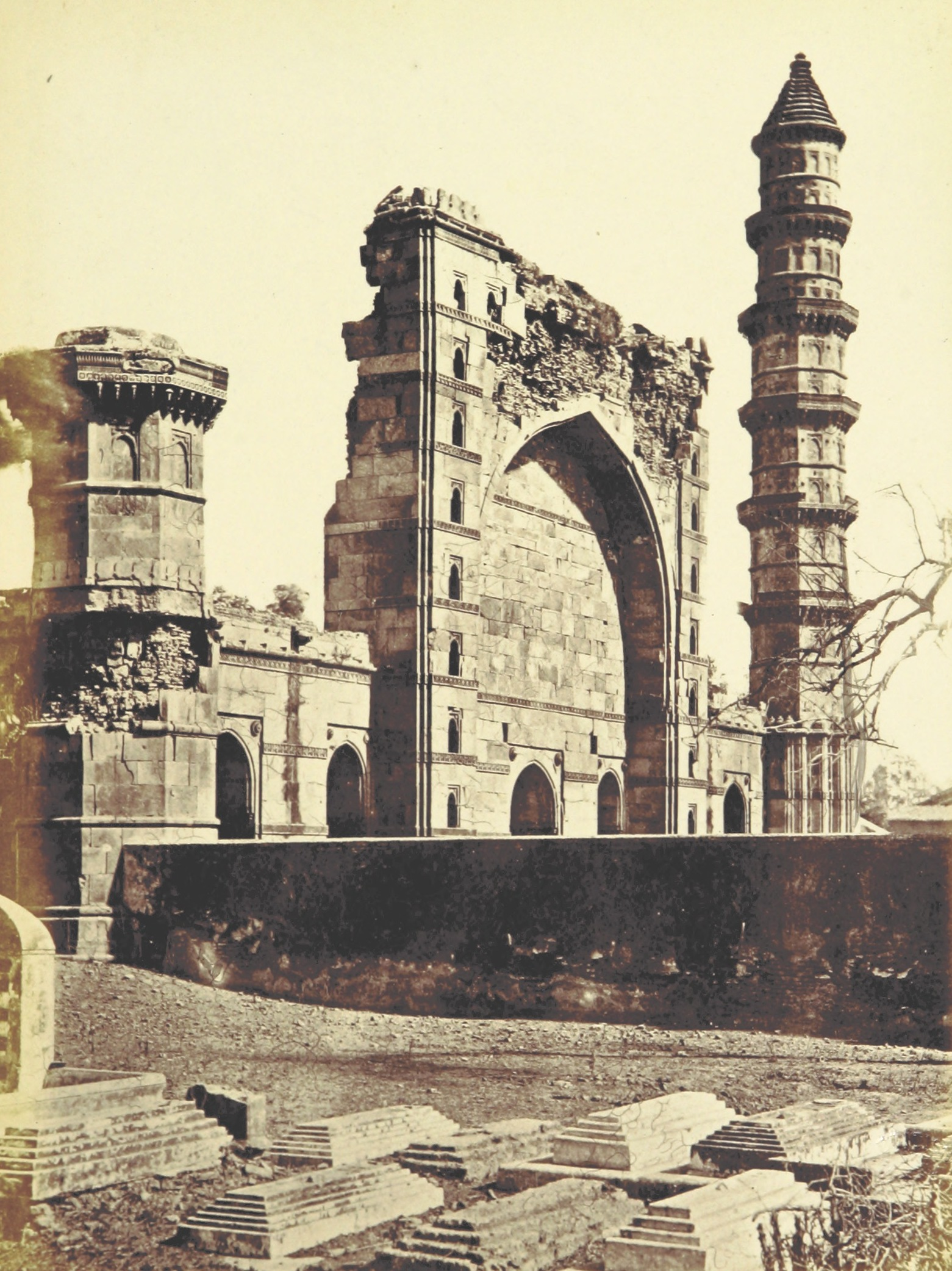
- The mosque from the south, 1866

- Location of the mosque in Ahmedabad

Religion
- Affiliation: Sunni Islam
- Sect: Sufi Shattari
- Ecclesiastical or organizational status: Mosque
- Status: Active

Location
- Location: Sarangpur, Ahmedabad, Gujarat
- Country: India
- Interactive map of Mohammed Ghous Mosque
- Coordinates: 23°01′14″N 72°35′49″E

Architecture
- Type: Mosque architecture
- Style: Indo-Islamic
- Founder: Mohammed Ghaus
- Completed: 1562

Specifications
- Dome: Several (unknown quantity)
- Minaret: Two

The Mohammed Ghous Mosque, also known as the Mosque of Muhammad Ghous Gwaliori or Shattari or the Ek Toda Mosque, is a Sufi mosque, located in the Sarangpur area of Ahmedabad, in the state of Gujarat, India.

== History ==
The mosque was built in 1562 by the Sufi saint Sheikh Mohammed Ghaus of Gwalior. He stayed in Ahmedabad for ten years and preached Sufi Shattari tradition. His son Sheikh Uwais also preached until 16th century.

== Architecture ==
The mosque represents Jaunpuri style of Indo-Islamic architecture. There are two rows of pillars which are connected by arches. The arches support flat domes of the mosque. There are two octagonal minarets at the ends of the façade. The northern minaret is complete where southern minaret is broken from one storey above the roof level. The northern minaret has five balconies alternating with gaps.

== Gallery ==
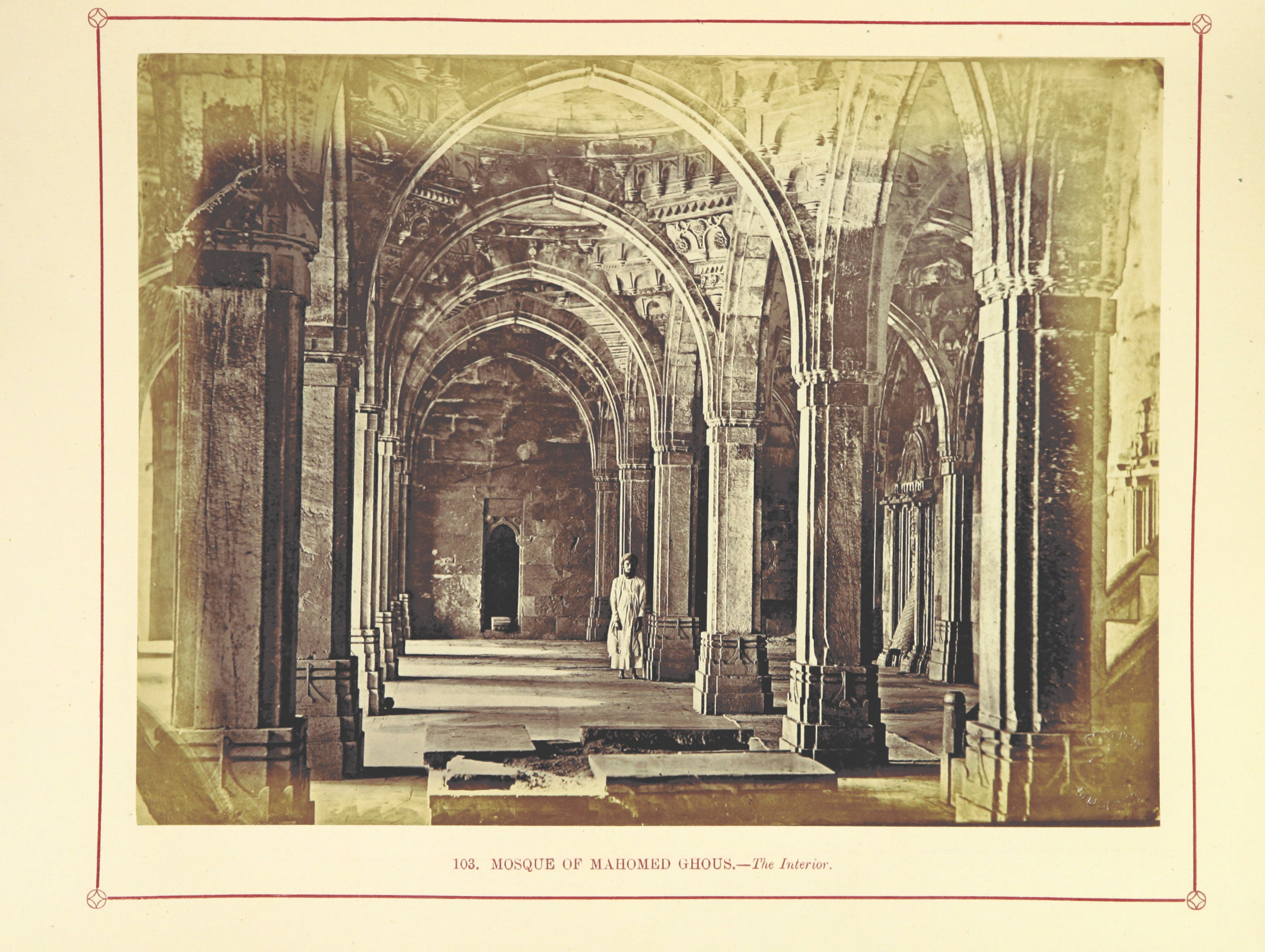
Interior of the mosque

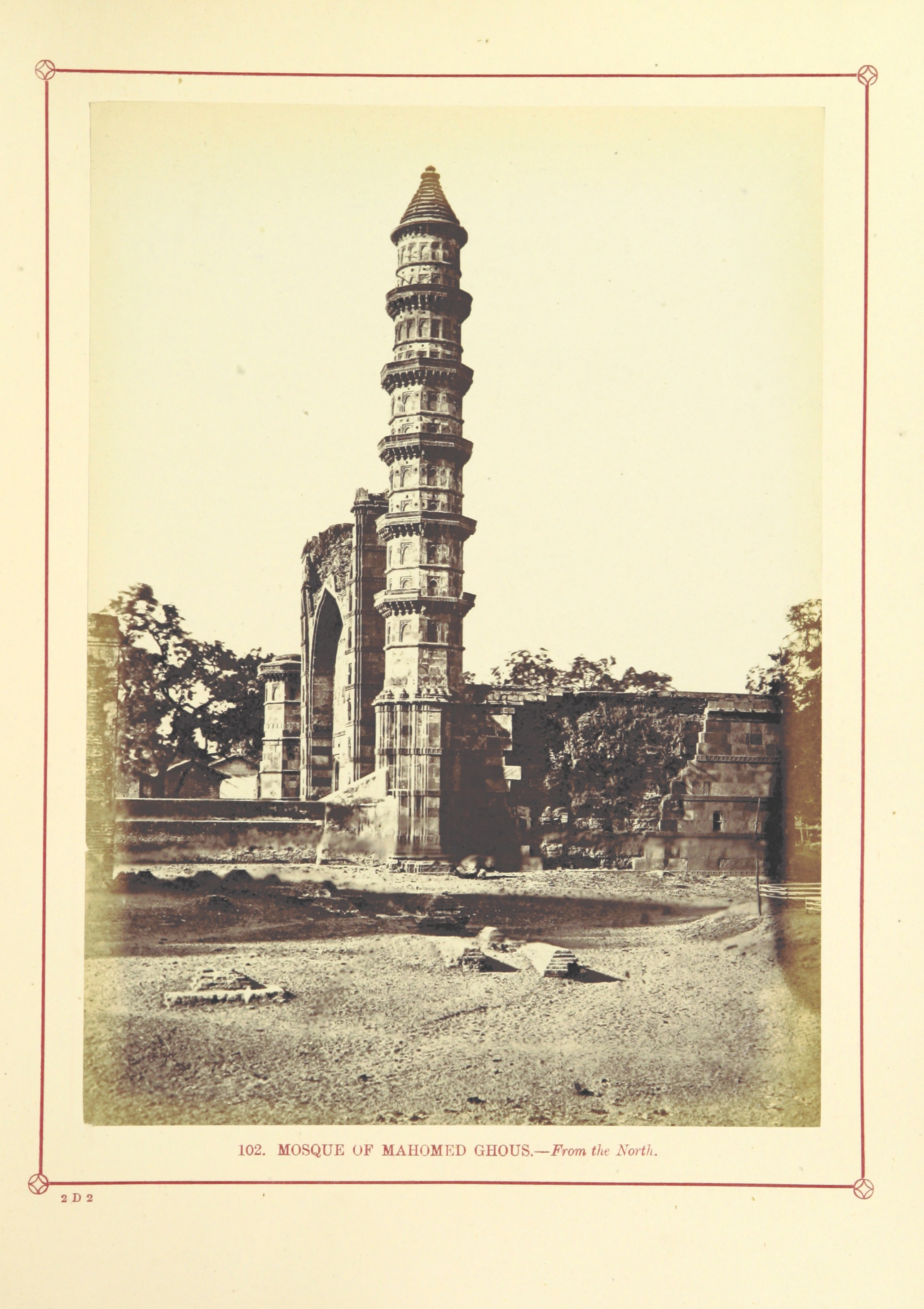
The mosque from north end, 1866

== See also ==
- Islam in India
- List of mosques in India
