= Khirala =

Khirala खिराला Khirala Shareef
- city
- Location in Madhya Pradesh, India Khirala खिराला (India)
- Coordinates: 21.6180228°N 76.3056764°E
- Country: India
- State: Madhya Pradesh
- District: Khandwa

Government
  - Type: Sarpanch
  - Body: Gram panchayat
- Elevation: 343 m (1,125 ft)

Population (2011)
  - Total: 6,371

Languages
  - Official: Hindi
- Time zone: UTC+5:30 (IST)
- PIN: 450337
- Telephone code: 07320
- ISO 3166 code: IN-MP
- Vehicle registration: MP-12
- Spoken Languages: Hindi, Bhili, Devanagari, Khatri

Khirala, also commonly referred to as Khirala Sharif, is a village in Pandhana tehsil in the Khandwa district (previously known as East Nimar) of Madhya Pradesh, India. It belongs to the Indore division. It is located 26 km South of the district headquarter in Khandwa, 6 km from Pandhana and 251 km from state capital Bhopal.

== Tomb ==
The village houses the tomb of Haji Sayyed Mohammed Badiuddin zia-ul-haq Qadri Shattari, Dargah of a Sufi from Madhya Pradesh. The Urs of Haji Sayyed Mohammed Badiuddin zia-ul-haq Qadri Shattari at Dargah Sharif in Khirala attracts thousands of visitors every year.
