= Wajihuddin Alvi =

Sufi saint (1504–1590)

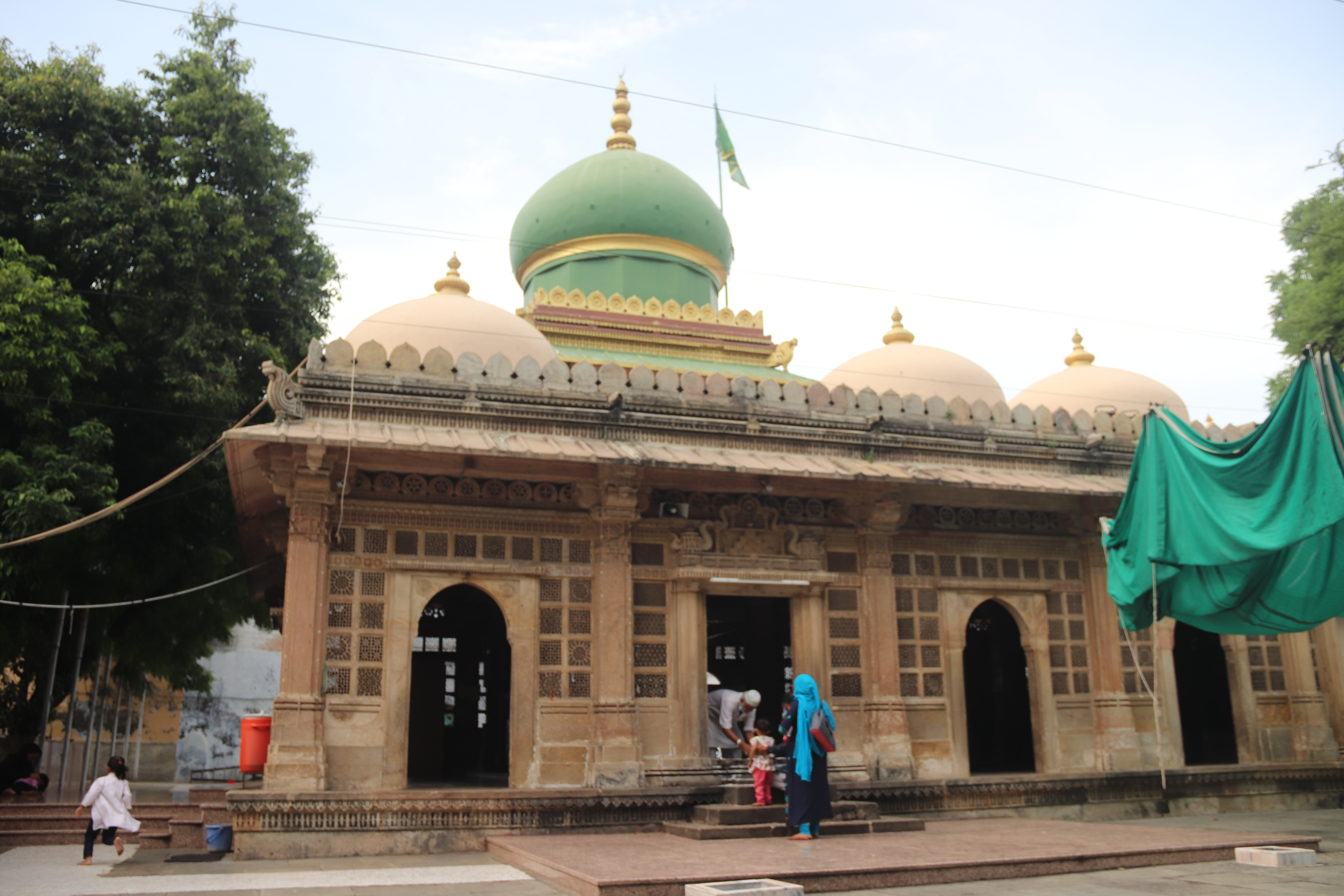
- The shrine of Wajihuddin Alvi in Ahmedabad

Personal life
- Born: 1504 Ahmedabad, Gujarat
- Died: 1590 (aged 85–86) Ahmedabad
- Resting place: Wajihuddin's Tomb

Religious life
- Religion: Islam
- Jurisprudence: Hanafi
- Tariqa: Shattari
- Creed: Maturidi

Muslim leader
- Teacher: Muhammad Ghous
- Successor: Hashim Pir Dastagir
- Students: Hashim Pir Dastagir Usman Bengali Yusuf Bengali

Shah Wajihuddin Alvi Gujarati (Persian: شاه وجیه الدین علوی گجراتی; 1504–1590), also known by the epithet Haider Ali Saani (Persian: حیدر علی ثانی), was an Islamic scholar and Sufi in the Shattari order.

== Life ==
Wajihuddin Alvi Gujarati was born in Ahmedabad in 1504 into a family of Sufi scholars and jurists. In 1528 he founded the Alvi Madrasa, which was Ahmedabad's most notable Islamic learning centre for over a century and a half. He was made a member of the Shattariyya order by Muhammad Ghous. Under his leadership, Ahmedabad became a major centre of Islamic studies, attracting students from all over India, and many of his disciples became prominent figures, including Syed Sibghatallah al-Barwaji, who moved to Medina and established the Shattari tradition in Saudi Arabia, Sheikh Abdul Qadir, who settled in Ujjain, and Sheikh Abu Turab, who moved to Lahore, and students from Bengal such as Usman and Yusuf, who contributed to Islamic education in medieval Hindustan.

== Works ==
Wajihuddin Alvi is reported to have written books in Arabic and Persian:

- Hashiya Alvi Ala Tafsir Baydawi حاشية العلوي على تفسير البيضاوي
- Sharh Nuzhat Al-Nazar شرح نزهة النظر للكجراتي مع نخبة الفكر للعسقلاني
- Hashiya Alvi ala Sharh al-Jami حاشية علوي على شرح الجامي
- Aidah Haqiqat Sharh Haqiqat Muhamadi ايضاح حقيقت شرح حقيقت محمدي

== Shrine ==
Sources differ on the year of his death: the Encyclopaedia of Islam Three gives 1590, while another source gives 1580. He is buried in a memorial tomb in Khanpur, Ahmedabad, built by his disciple Syed Murtuza Khan Bukhari, the eleventh (1606–1609) governor of Ahmedabad during the reign of Jahangir.
