= Muhammad Ghawth =

Sufi Saint from Gwalior

Personal life
- Born: Muhammad Ghawth Gwaliyari; 1500 Gwalior, India
- Died: 1562 (aged 61–62) Gwalior
- Occupation: Master of Sufism, author, musician
- Relatives: Attar of Nishapur (ancestor)

Religious life
- Religion: Islam

Muslim leader
- Successor: Ali Sher Bengali
- Students: Ali Sher Bengali, Shah Manjhan, Wajihuddin Alvi, Nagore Shahul Hamid
- Monuments: Tomb of Mohammad Guaz (ASI N-MP-147)

Muhammad Ghawth (Ghouse, Ghaus or Gwath) Gwaliyari (1500–1562) was a 16th-century Sufi master of the Qadri Shattari order and Sufi saint, a musician, and the author of Jawahir-i Khams (Arabic: al-Jawahir al-Khams, The Five Jewels). Ghawth's life, miracles, and mystical ascension are examined in Scott Kugle's article "Heaven's Witness".

== Biography ==
Muhammad Ghawth was born in Gwalior, India in 1500; the name Gwaliyari means "of Gwalior". One of his ancestors was Fariduddin Attar of Nishapur. In the preface of al-Jawahir al-Khams, he states that he wrote the book when he was 25 years old. In 1549 he travelled to Gujarat, when he was 50 years old. He stayed in Ahmedabad for ten years where he founded Ek Toda Mosque and preached.

Ghawth translated the Amrtakunda from Sanskrit to Persian as the Bahr al-Hayat (The Ocean of Life), introducing to Sufism a set of yoga practices. According to the scholar Carl W. Ernst, in this "translation", Ghawth intentionally reframed these practices with great subtlety to identify "points of contact between the terminologies of Yoga and Sufism".

Ghawth died in Gwalior in 1562. His followers believed that he ascended to heaven and from there was able to direct help down to them; and further, that he was the "axial saint, the pivot of the universe".

Among Ghawth's disciples was Fazl Allah Shattari (also known as Shah Fazl Shattari), who wrote a biography or monograph in praise of his teacher. Ghawth also taught the Mughal Emperor Humayun, whose court musician Tansen was likewise familiar with Sufism. Other important disciples included Badusha, Abdul Qadir, and Shahul Hamid Meeran Sahib Ganjasavoy Ganja Bakhsh Ganja Makhfi of Nagore, Tamil Nadu, along with Wajihuddin Haidar Ali Sani Hussaini Alvi Gujarati.

== Tomb at Gwalior ==
His tomb at Gwalior is famous for its stone lattice (jali) work; the entire structure is enclosed on all sides by carved stone latticework. The tomb was built in Ghawth's honour by Akbar and is regarded as a fine example of Mughal architecture. Tansen, Akbar's court musician, is buried in the same tomb complex. The tomb remains a popular pilgrimage and tourist site.

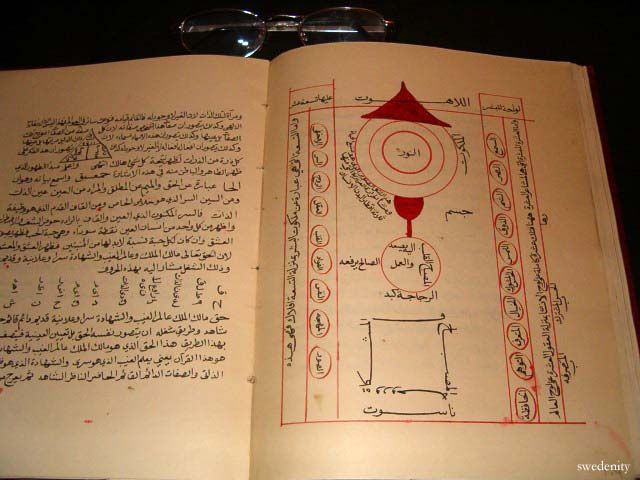
Ghawth's Jawahir al-Khams

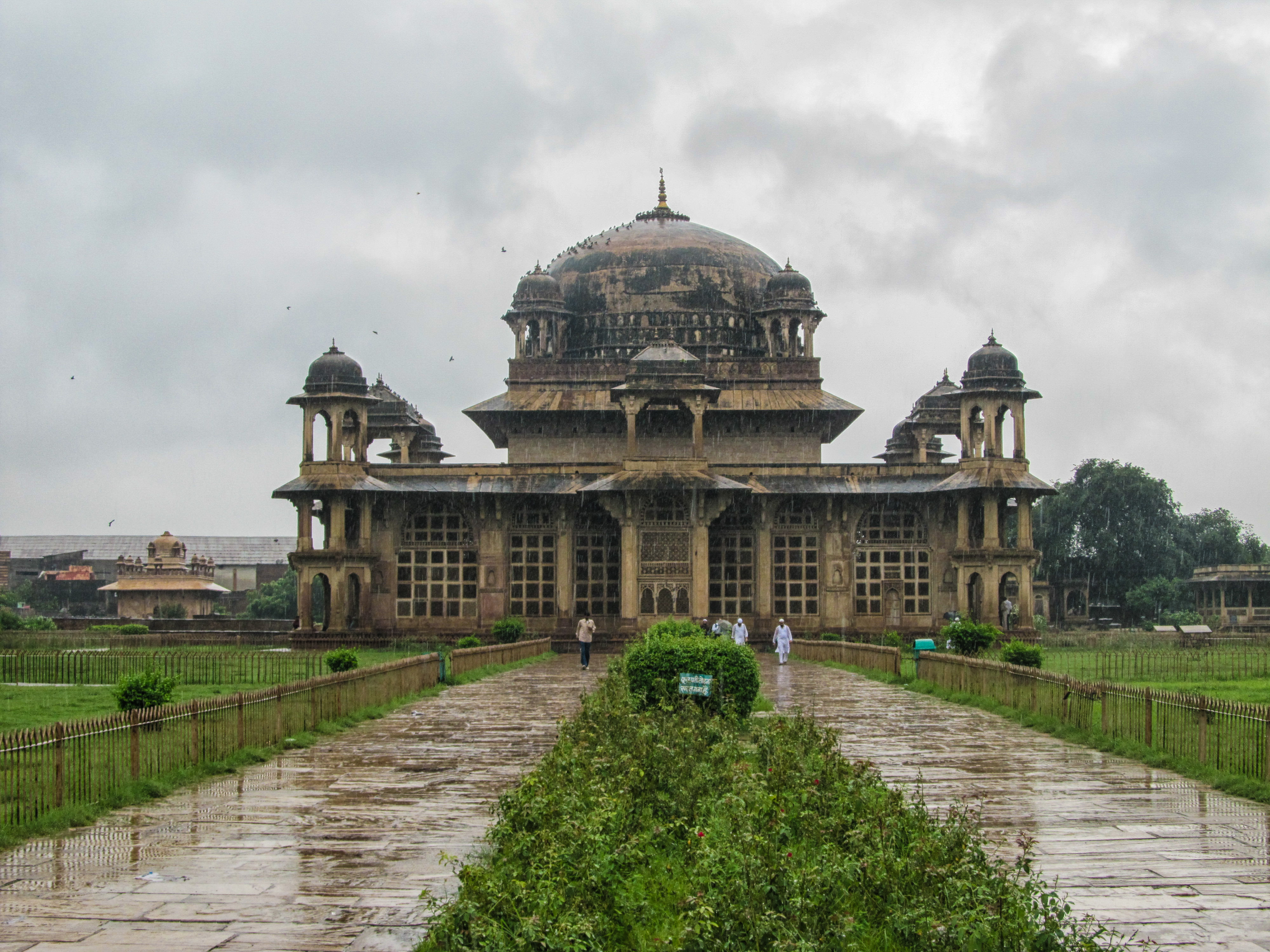
Ghawth's tomb in Gwalior

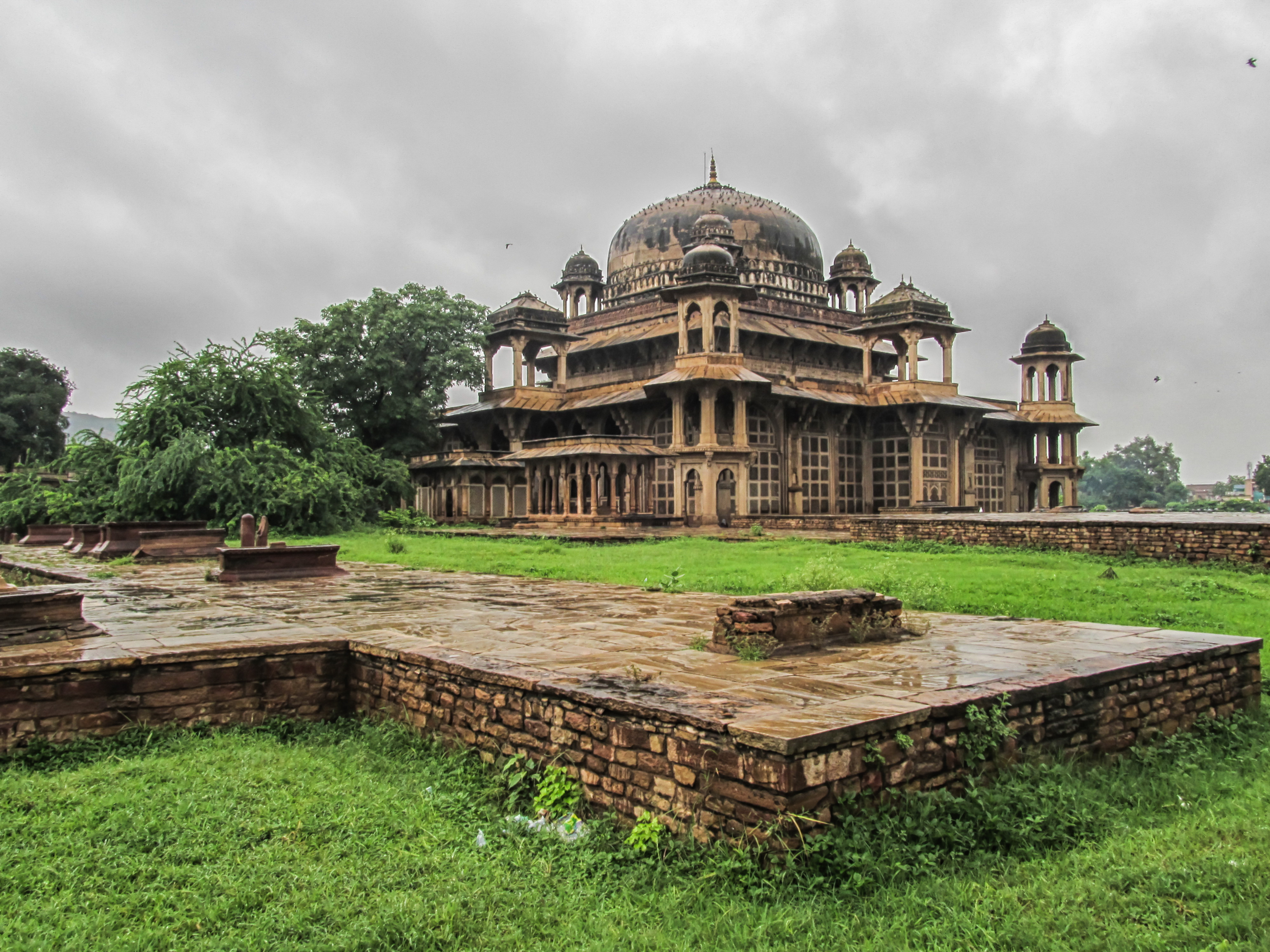
South-east view of tomb

Sufi Saeed Ali Shah was a former caretaker of the shrine.

== Works ==
- Jawahir-i-Khamsa (The Five Jewels) which was later translated to Arabic, al-Jawahir al-Khams, by the Mecca-based Shattari teacher Sibghat Allah (d. 1606 CE). In this book Gaus also mentioned the special creatures known as "Muakkil" which come under the control of Sufis by special Islamic chant.The term "Muakkil" is used for an angel in the Islamic Occult World, called "عملیاتی دنیا" in Urdu.
- Bahr al-Hayat (The Ocean of Life), his translation and extension of Hawd al-Hayat (The Pool of Life), an Arabic translation of a lost Sanskrit text on yoga, the Amrtakunda.
