= Amar Singh Rathore =

Rao Amar Singh
- Subahdar of Nagaur; Rajkumar of Marwar
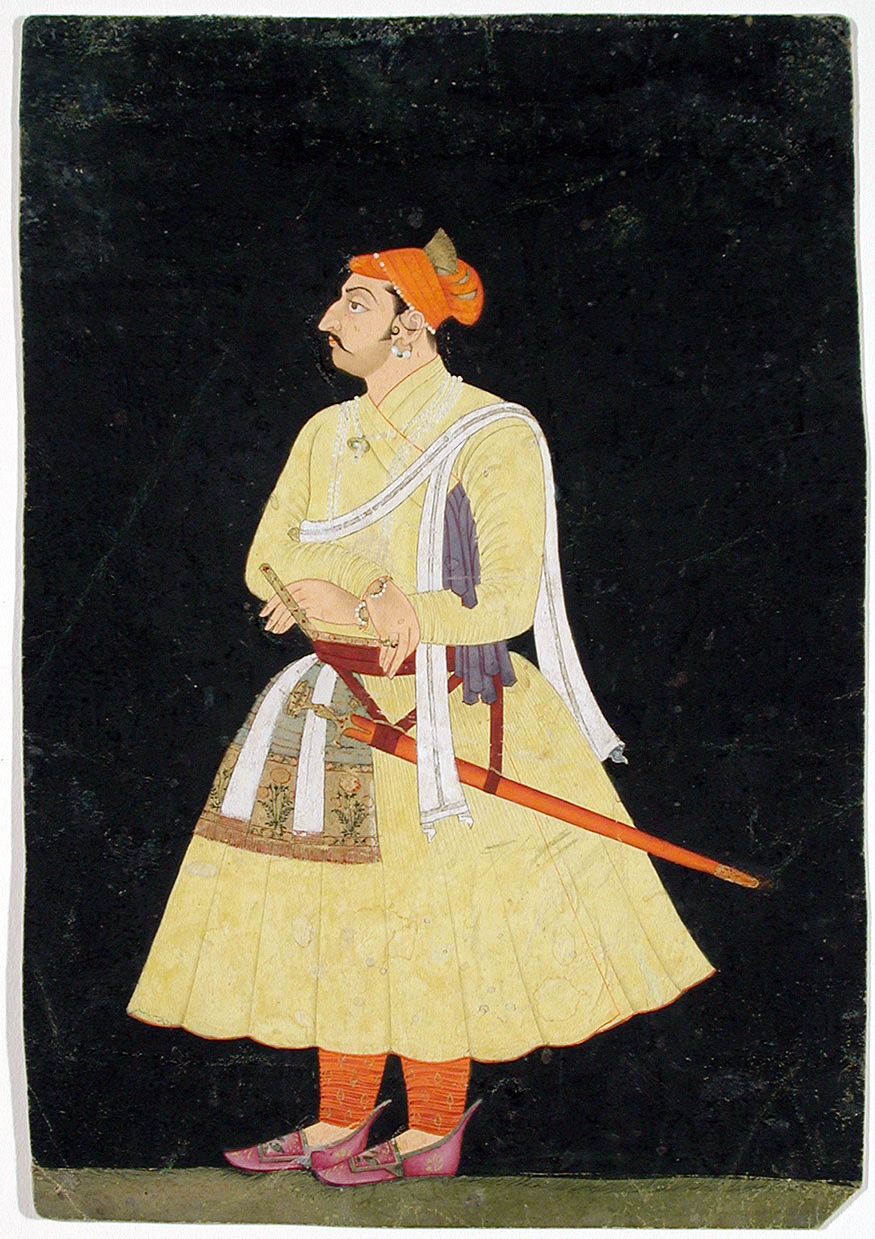
- Born: 30 December 1613; Jodhpur, Marwar, Rajputana
- Died: 21 July 1644 (aged 30); Agra, Mughal Empire
- Spouse: Guhilotji (Ahadiji) Ajab Deiji of Dungarpur Guhilotji (Ahadiji) Jasroop Deiji of Banswara Bhatiyaniji Sabsukh Deiji of Bawdi in Marwar Jadejiji Bahurang Deiji of Jamnagar Sisodiniji Anoop Deiji of Mewar Kachwahiji Anand Deiji of Amber Kachwahiji Dheer Deiji of Amarsar in Amber Kachwahiji Laad Deiji of Amarsar in Amber Gaurji of Rajgarh in Ajmer
- Issue: Rai Singh Ishwari Singh Jagat Singh (died infant) Kalyan Kanwarji (died young) Anoop Kanwarji m.to Mughal Prince Sulaiman Shikoh son of Dara Shikoh Deep Kanwarji Badan Kanwarji
- House: House of Rathore
- Father: Gaj Singh of Marwar
- Mother: Chauhanji (Songariji) Mansukh Deiji d.of Rao Jaswant Singh of Pali in Jalore

Rao Amar Singh (30 December 1613 – 25 July 1644) was the eldest son and heir-apparent of Raja Gaj Singh I of the Rathore Kingdom of Marwar in seventeenth-century Rajputana.

After he was disinherited and exiled by his family, he entered into the imperial Mughal service. His legendary bravery and battle prowess resulted in elevation to a high rank in the imperial nobility and personal recognition by the emperor, who made him the subedar (governor) of a region that was directly ruled by the emperor himself, Nagaur.

In 1644, he was enraged by an attempt by the emperor to levy a fine on him for an unauthorized absence. In the emperor's presence, he stabbed and killed the Wazir of Mughal Emperor Shah Jahan, Salabat Khan, who had been asked to collect the fine. He is celebrated in some popular ballads of Rajasthan, Western Uttar Pradesh and Punjab.

== Family ==
Amar Singh was born on 11 December 1613 as the eldest son, thus heir apparent to his father Yuvraj Gaj Singh I who in turn was heir apparent to his father as the eldest son of Raja Sur Singh of Marwar. His mother Songariji was the granddaughter of Rao Man Singh Songara of Pali maternal uncle of Maharana Pratap Singh I of Mewar.

== Life ==
On the death of his father, the Rathore throne of the Kingdom of Marwar was given to his 11 year old younger half brother, Kunwar Jaswant Singh, as per his father's wish. This was due to Raja Gaj Singh being extremely fond Jaswant Singh's mother Sisodiniji Pratap Deiji and also due to the influence of his favourite khawasin (concubine), Anara Begum, who was on bad terms with Yuvraj Amar Singh. He instead received the pargana of Nagaur and the ruling title of Rao. He was accompanied by Girdharji Vyas a Pushkarna Brahmin from Jodhpur as an elderly advisor and administrator in Nagaur. Girdharji was one of the main commander of the army who fought Mughals in Agra to avenge Amar Singh death. Girdharji attained martyrdom with the brave fellow Rathore kinsman Baludas Champawat fighting Mughals at Agra.

== Commemoration in popular culture ==
Amar Singh Rathore is considered an icon of extraordinary might, will and freedom. Neither fear, nor greed were able to affect his decisions. He died as a free man. The bravery of Amar Singh Rathore and Ballu Champavat is still remembered in folk songs in Rajasthan and around Agra. A Hindi movie based on Amar Singh was made in 1970, named 'Veer Amar Singh Rathore' and directed by Radhakant. Dev Kumar, Kumkum and Zeba Rehman were the lead actors of the movie in Black and White. A Gujarati movie was also made on the same subject and the lead role was played by Gujarati actor Upendra Trivedi. A gate of Agra Fort was named after him as 'Amar Singh Gate' which is a major tourist attraction in Agra. A small excerpt from a Punjabi ballad on Amar Singh Rathore describes his angry entry into Shah Jahan's Diwan-i-Khas and Salabat Khan's attempts to hold him back. -

Original

Dekhkar Shahjahan Badshah bharta hankare,
Kaha Salabat Khan nun: "Karo kam hamare.
Age auna na do, Rajput rakho atkare."
Salabat Khan un Bakhshi dida tare,
"Adab manke khara raho, Rajput bichare!
Teri bat digi Darbar men, main khara sidhare."
"Meri tu kya bat sanwarda, Kartar sanware!"
Amar Singh digaia, no dige, jaisa parbat bhari.
"Hatke khara ganwariar! Kya kare ganwari?"

Jabbal kadhi misri nikali do dhari:
Mare Salabat Khan di ja khili pari:
Lagi mard de hath di na rahi wo dhari.
"Eh le apne sat lakh, Salabat piare!
Kante dharke janch le, hor ghat hamare!"

Translation

As soon as he saw him Shahjahan the King called out,
And said to Salabat Khan: "Do my bidding.
Let not the Rajput come forward, keep him back."
Salabat Khan, the Controller, cast his eyes on him,
(And said): "Stand and be respectful, thou wretched Rajput!
Thy fame hath fallen in the Court, and I keep watch (over thee)."
"How can'st thou watch over me? God shall watch!"
Amar Singh, like a great mountain, was not to be kept back.
(Said Salabat Khan): "Stand back, thou boor! What wilt thou with thy boorishness?"

In his wrath he (Amar Singh) drew his dagger and struck twice:
He struck Salabat Khan and went through him:
Struck by a warrior's hand the blow stayed not.
"Take this for thy seven lakhs, friend Salabat!
Take thy scales and weigh them out!"

Social influence

- General Niazi, was known by the nickname of 'Amar Singh Rathore' by his Rajput regiment for his bravery in action during WWII.

=== Films and television ===
- He was portrayed by Ramesh Paradeshi in the 2019 Indian Marathi-language historical film Fatteshikast.

== See also ==
- Amar Singh Gate
