= Gaj Singh I =

Maharaja of Marwar from 1619 to 1638

Raja Gaj Singh I
- Raja; Maharaja
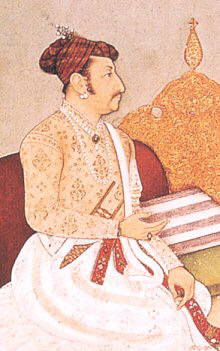

Maharaja of Marwar
- Tenure: 7 September 1619 – 6 May 1638
- Coronation: 1620, Sringar Chowki, Mehrangarh Fort, in the Kingdom of Marwar (Jodhpur State)
- Predecessor: Sawai Raja Sur Singh
- Successor: Maharaja Jaswant Singh
- Born: 30 October 1595; Lahore, Subah of Lahore, Mughal Empire
- Died: 6 May 1638 (aged 42); Agra, Subah of Agra, Mughal Empire
- Consort: Maharani Sisodini Pratap Deviji
- Spouses: Among others: Kachwahi Kalyan Deviji; Chauhan Amrat Deviji; Songiri Mansukh Deviji; Anara Begum
- Issue (among others): Amar Singh Rathore; Jaswant Singh
Names
- Maharaja Gaj Singh Rathore Ji Bahadur Sahab
- House: Rathore
- Father: Sawai Raja Sur Singh
- Mother: Rani Kachwahi Sobhag Devi
- Religion: Hinduism

Gaj Singh Rathore (Marwari pronunciation: [ɡədʒ sɪ̃ɳ rɑːʈʰoːɽ]; 30 October 1595 – 6 May 1638) was the ruler of the Kingdom of Marwar, who reigned as Gaj Singh I from 7 September 1619 until his death in 1638. He held the title of Raja and, after c. 1630, assumed the higher title of Maharaja.

== Early life ==
Born on 30 October 1595, Gaj Singh was the eldest surviving son of Sur Singh, Raja of Marwar. His mother, Rani Sobhag Deviji (née Krishnavati Bai), was the daughter of Sekhavat Kachwahi Durjan Sal.

In 1608, he accompanied his father to the court of Jahangir. In 1609, Mahabat Khan, who was then on an expedition against the Rana of Mewar, was misinformed that the Rana's family was being sheltered by Sur Singh in the fort of Sojat. Acting on this misinformation, Mahabat Khan granted Sojat to Karam Singh, a grandson of Chandrasen Rathore. The error was later rectified through the intervention of Bhatai Govinddas, and Sojat, along with Nagaur, was restored to Gaj Singh by Abdullah Khan.

Jalor, which was under the control of Bihari Pathans at the time, was granted to Gaj Singh as a jagir by Jahangir. Gaj Singh successfully brought Jalor under his control after killing over seven thousand Pathans.

== Reign ==
Gaj Singh was at Jodhpur when Sur Singh died in Mahikar, Deccan. Hearing the news, he immediately proceeded to Deccan leaving a noble named Rajsingh Kumpawat in-charge of Jodhpur. Jahangir sent a tika to Gaj Singh and had granted him the pargana of Jaitaran, Sojat, Siwana, Satalmar, Jodhpur, Terwada and Gondwada and also bestowed upon him a mansab of 3000 Zat and 2000 Sawar along with the title of Raja.

He soon after proceeded to the Mughal outpost at Mahikar. Forces of Ahmednagar led by Amber Jeo which the Raja repelled successfully. For his services, he was granted the title Dalthaman. When Prince Khurram (later Shah Jahan) was given charge of the Deccan, Gaj Singh took a leave and proceeded to Agra in Jodhpur. Jahangir raised his mansab to 4000 Zat and 3000 Sawar and granted him the parganas of Jalor and Sanchore.

On 5 May 1623, Gaj Singh was deputized along with Mahabat Khan and Parviz Mirza to hunt down the rebel Prince Khurram. On the eve of his departure, he was given Phalodi in jagir and his mansab was raised to 5000 Zat and 4000 Sawar.

On 16 October 1624, a battle was fought between the imperial army and Khurram's army. Gaj Singh was initially not willing to take active part in this battle and encamped himself on the left side if the river. The rebel army almost won when Bhim Sisodia, ally of Khurram, challenged him to take part in the battle. The coarse language caused Gaj Singh to take active part in the battle and soon the rebel army was enrouted. The reason of Gaj Singh's unwillingness might have been due to the close relation he shared with Khurram, who was born of the Jodhpur Princess, Jodh bai, who was the uterine sister of his father Sur Singh. Another reason might have been that, he had judged the days of the Emperor was numbered and wanted to be on good side of Khurram. However, his wish could not be fulfilled. Still, due to this victory, he received the rank of 5000 Zat and 5000 Sawar by Jahangir.

Raja Gaj Singh with Khan Jahan Lodi was in Deccan when Jahangir died. Gaj Singh then deserted Khan Jahan.

Gaj Singh visited the court of Shah Jahan soon after his accession. The Emperor renewed Gaj Singh's mansab and awarded him Khasa Khilat (a special robe of honour), a sword, a horse, an elephant and a kettledrum. He was deputed against Khan Jahan Lodi, the rebel governor of Deccan on 22 February 1630. He was made the commander of one of the three armies against Khan Jahan and faced the guerrilla tactics of the rebels valiantly. For his services he was awarded pargana of Mahrot in jagir and the title of 'Maharaja' was conferred upon him.

He was deputed with Asaf Khan against the sultan of Bijapur in December 1631. In March 1636, he was awarded a horse with its special golden equipment and returned from Deccan along with the Emperor Shah Jahan. He was then deputed in the army under Prince Shuja.

== Personal life and succession ==
=== Marriages and concubines ===
Gaj Singh was officially married to eleven Rajput princesses:

1. Kachwahi Kalyan Deviji
2. Chauhan Amrat Deviji
3. Sisodiya Pratap Deviji
4. Chandravat Kashmir Deviji
5. Bhatiyani Lachal Deviji
6. Sonagari Mansukh Deviji
7. Waghel Kasumbha Deviji
8. Jadeja Norang Deviji
9. Kachwahi Suraj Deviji
10. Naruki Kachawahi Keshar Deviji
11. Bhatianiji Udaikunwar Deviji

Gaj Singh also had at least three concubines, including Anara Begum. She was originally the wife of a Nawab of Delhi, whom Gaj Singh had abducted and taken into his household as a khawas. Anara went on to become an important figure in Gaj Singh's durbar, playing an instrumental role in his decision to nominate his second son, Jaswant Singh, as successor over the first-born Amar Singh Rathore, who was instead granted the territory of Nagore as compensation.

=== Issue ===
Gaj Singh had nine children, of which four survived till adulthood:

1. Amar Singh Rathore, son of Sonagari Mansukh Deviji
2. Chandravati Bai, daughter
3. Jaswant Singh, son of Sisodiya Pratap Deviji, who succeeded Gaj Singh following his death in 1638
4. Sugdha Bai, daughter of Anara Begum

== Death and legacy ==
Gaj Singh died soon after his return to Agra on 6 May 1638 and was cremated on the bank of river Yamuna.

The khyat Gajsinh ri Khyat chronicles the events in the Raja Gaj Singh's life from his coronation in V.S. 1676 (1619 AD) to his death in 1638 AD. It also records Gaj Singh conferring various charitable grants including lakh pasav and Sasan lands to the Charans.

== Ancestry ==
Ancestors of Gaj Singh I

7. Maldeo, Rao of Marwar
4. Udai Singh, Raja of Marwar
8. Swarup Devi
2. Sur Singh, Raja of Marwar
9. Askaran, Raja of Narwar
5. Manrang Devi
1. Gaj Singh
10. Kachwaha Karamsi of Amarsar
6. Kachwaha Durjan Sal
3. Sobhag Devi

== See also ==
- Rulers of Marwar
