= Khan 'Alam =

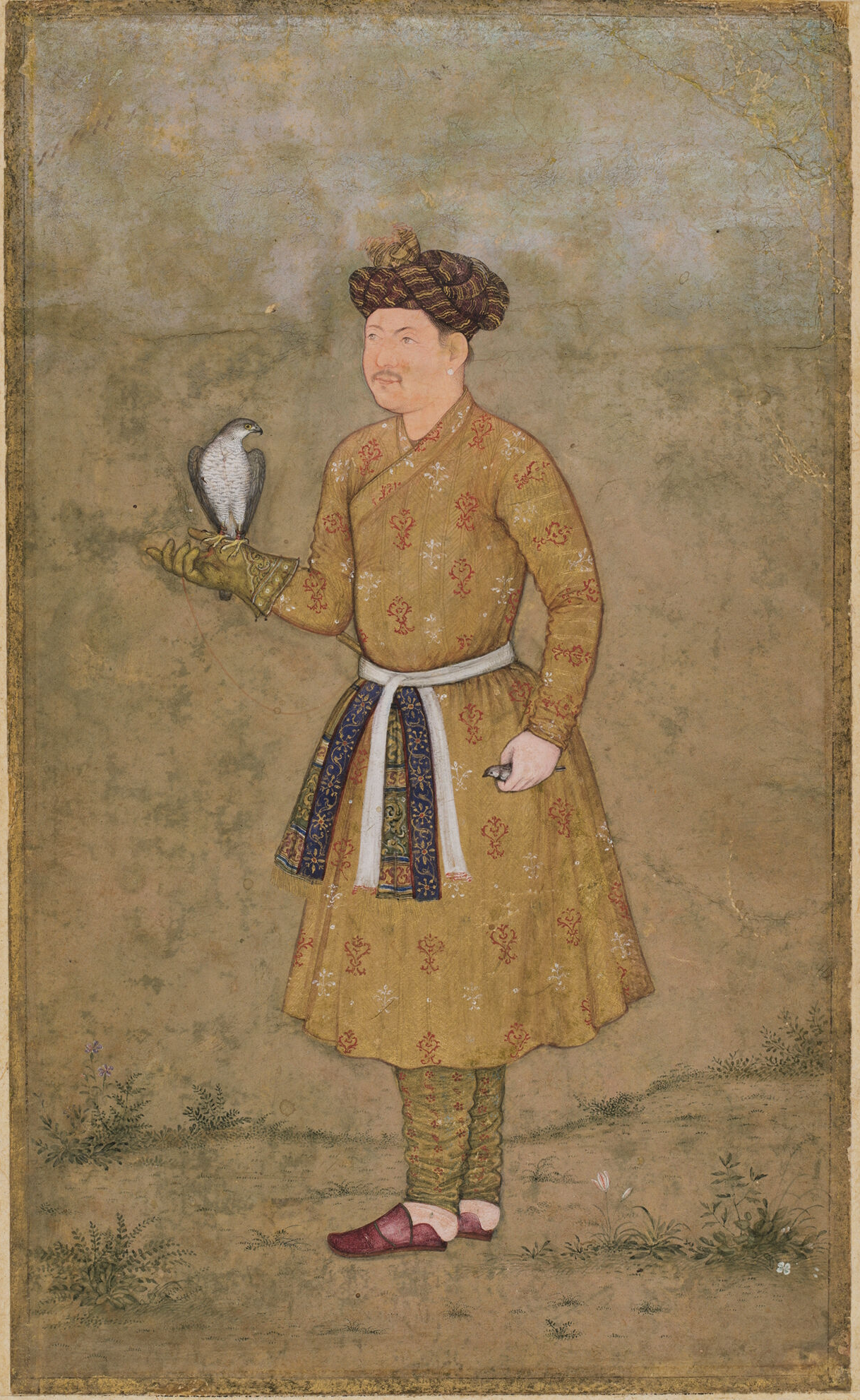
Khan ‘Alam, Mughal Emperor Jahangir's Falconer and His Ambassador to Iran, with a Sparrow Hawk. Attributed to Govardhan, Indian, c. 1610–1620.

Mirza Barkhurdar, better known as Khan ‘Alam, was Mughal Emperor Jahangir’s falconer, and his ambassador to Persia from 1613 to 1619.

Khan ‘Alam brought numerous gifts to Shah Abbas in his capital of Isfahan, including jewelry, and rare objects. He spent five years at the Safavid court, where he was in close contact with Shah Abbas. Upon his return, Khan ‘Alam left with gifts for Jahangir, including 240 portraits of Timur and his descendants.

The embassy famously included the Mughal painter Bishandas. Jahangir was so keen on obtaining realistic depictions of his contemporaries, possibly as a way to better understand their character and intentions, that in 1613 Bishandas was sent to accompany on a diplomatic mission to Persia led by Khan ‘Alam, to paint the portraits of Shah Abbas I of Persia (1571–1629) and other leading Persian figures such as Abbas's second son Soltan Mohammad Mirza, Saru Taqi or Isa Khan. There he was so successful that he remained until 1620, and on his return Jahangir gave him an elephant.

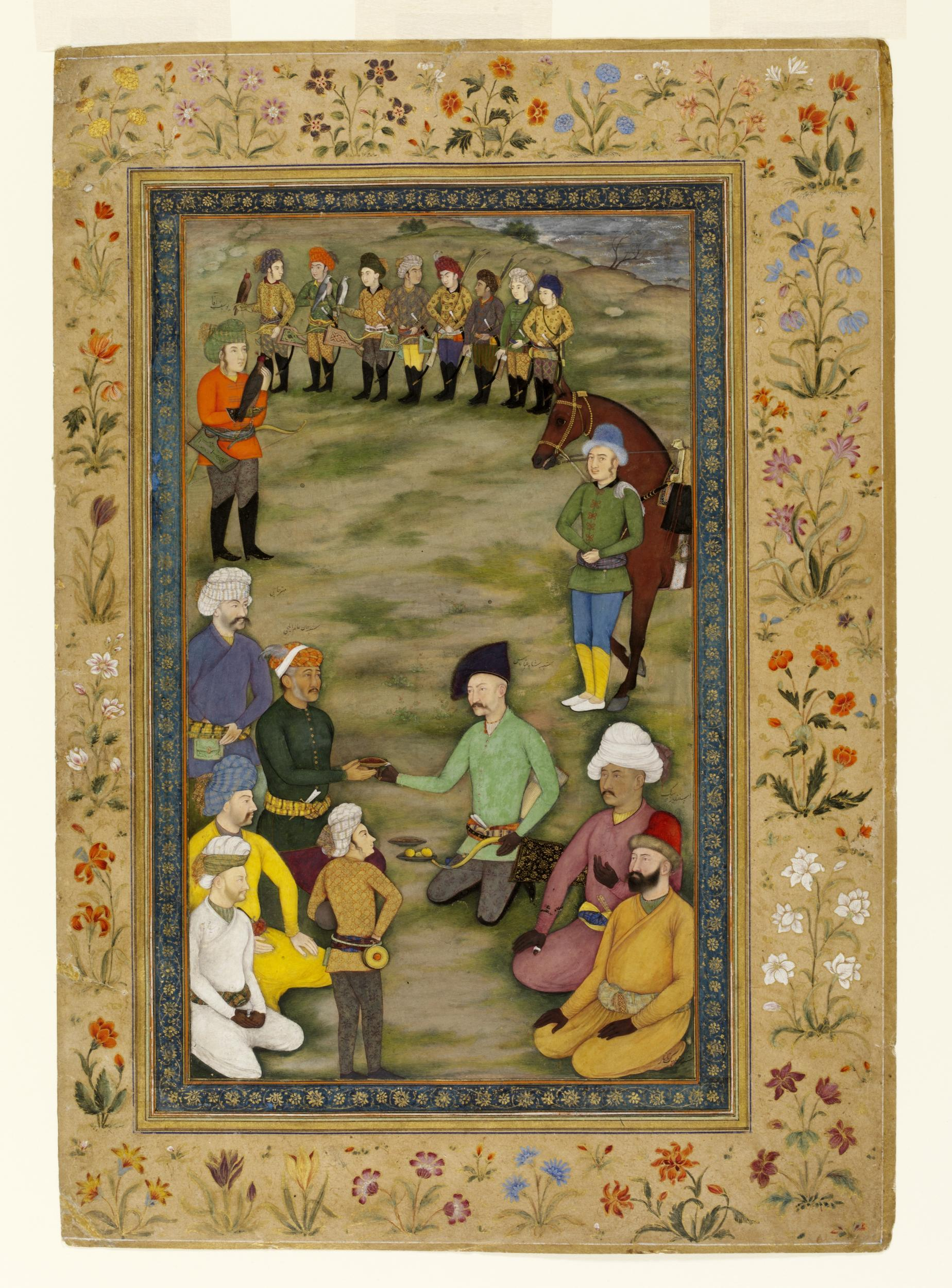
Shah Abbas and Khan Alam

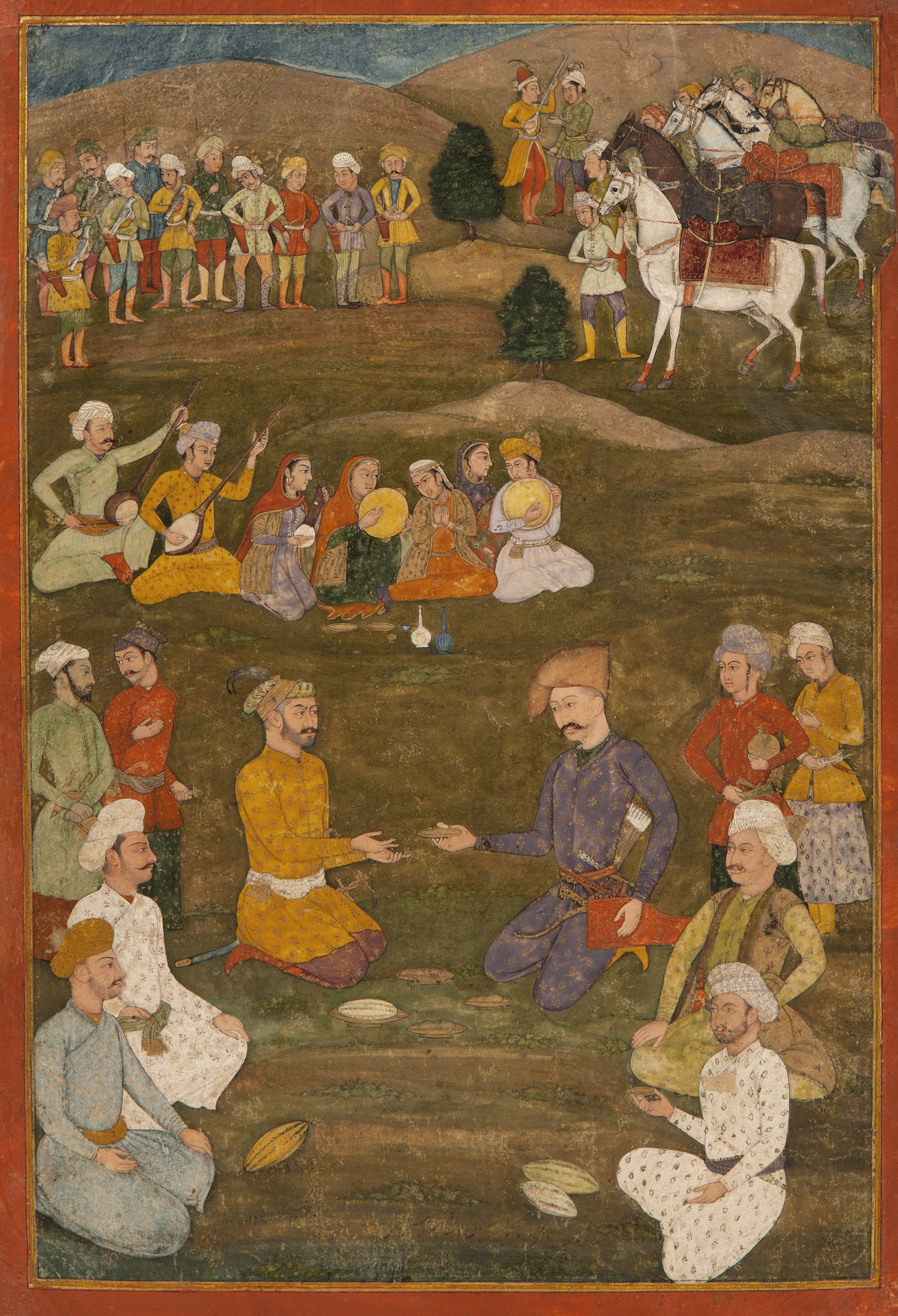
Shah Abbas and Khan Alam in 1618

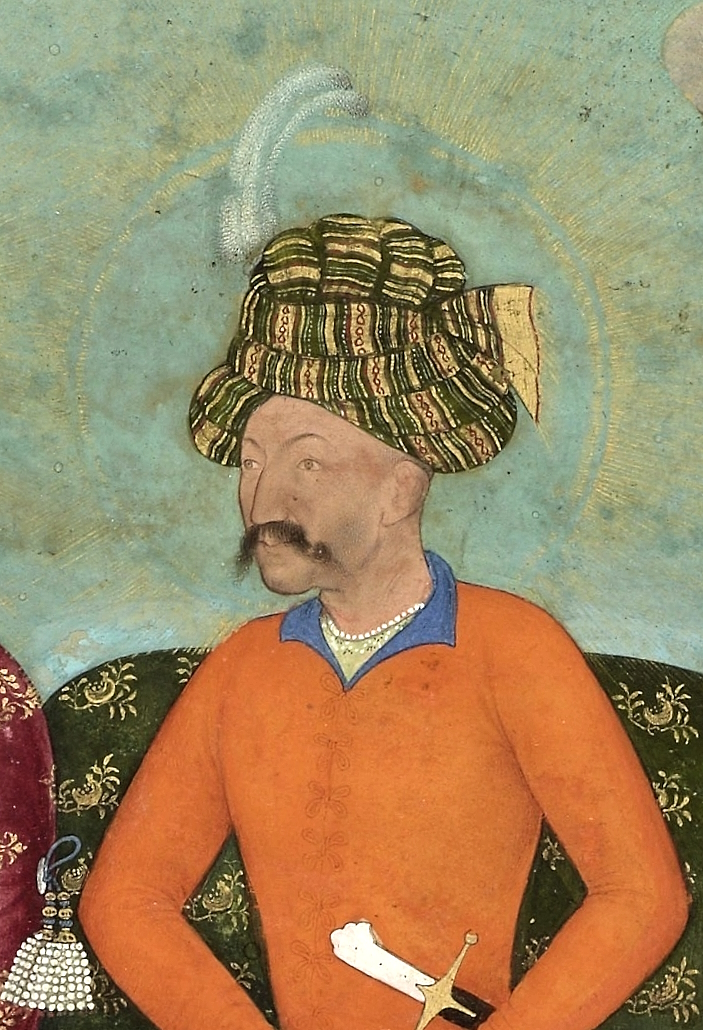
A contemporary portrait of Shah 'Abbas, painted from life c. 1618 by Bishandas.
