= Wajihuddin's Tomb =

Shah Wajihuddin Alvi Tomb
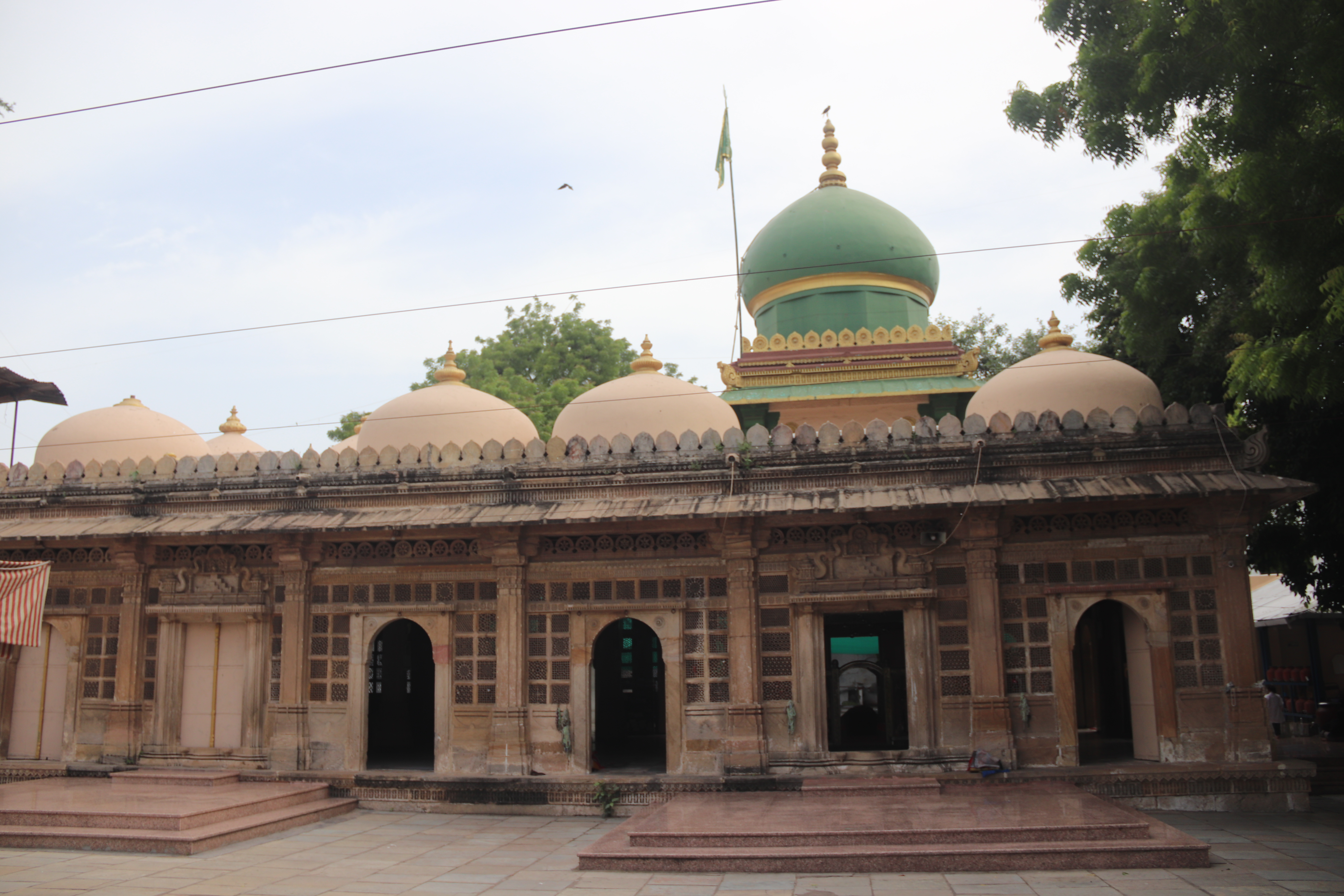
- Wajihuddin Alvi's Tomb in 2021

- Location in Ahmedabad, Gujarat, India Wajihuddin's Tomb (Gujarat)

Religion
- Affiliation: Islam
- Status: Active

Location
- Location: Khanpur, Ahmedabad
- Municipality: Ahmedabad Municipal Corporation
- State: Gujarat
- Coordinates: 23.0283957°N 72.5788483°E

Architecture
- Type: Tomb
- Style: Indo-Islamic architecture
- Funded by: Syed Murtuza Khan Bukhari

Wajihuddin's Tomb or Hazrat Wajihuddin Dargah, is a tomb of Sufi saint Wajihuddin Alvi in Khanpur area of Ahmedabad, India.

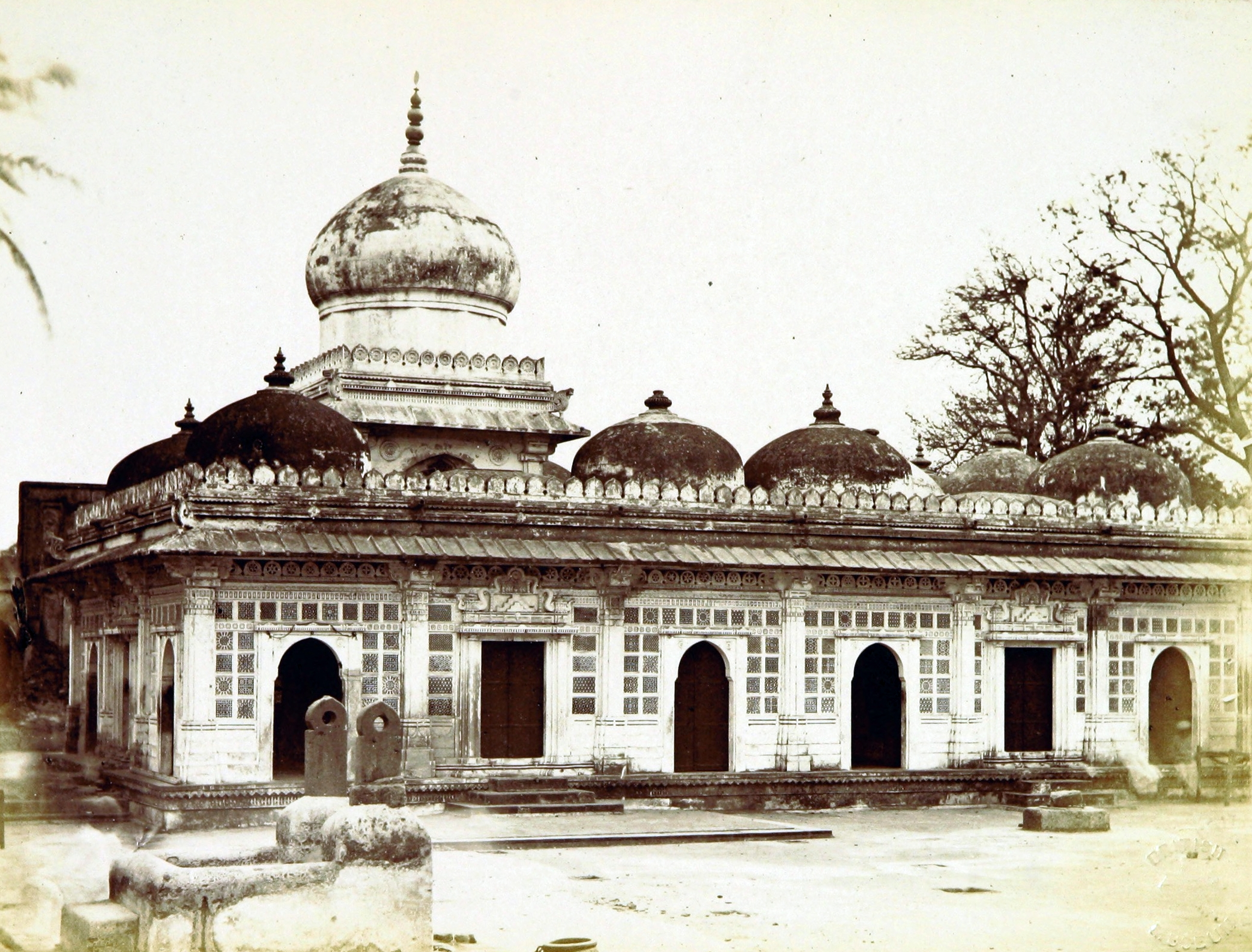
Wajihuddin Alvi's Tomb in 1866

== History and architecture ==
Wajīh al-Dīn ʿAlawī Gujarātī was born in Ahmedabad in 1504 into a family of Sufi scholars and jurists, who were patronised by the sultans of Gujarat. In 1528 he founded the ʿAlawī Madrasa which was Ahmedbad's most notable Islamic learning center for over a century and a half. In his youth he was a member of several Sufi orders, but most importantly he was initiated into the Shaṭṭāriyya order by Muhammad Ghawth Gwāliyārī. Despite being a Sunni and a proponent of Hadith, he professed the unity of God, man, and the universe and taught dhikr or repetition of God's names. When it came to Islamic sectarianism, he professed "total peace", and opposed discrimination against the Mahdawi movement. During the Mughal conquest of Gujarat in 1572-1573, he harboured the sons and supporters of the former sultan of Gujarat, Muẓaffar Shāh III. Due to this he was summoned by the Mughal emperor Akbar before being let go. He died in his madrasa in 1590.

The tomb dedicated to him was built by his disciple Syed Murtuza Khan Bukhari, the eleventh (1606-1609) governor of Ahmedabad during reign of Jahangir. The central dome is much higher than several other domes surrounding it. The walls have perforated stone windows. There is an underground reservoir and a cistern said to have healing power and not to have been dry ever. The nearby mosque was built by Wajihuddin's grandson Shaikh Haidar, which was visited by Jahangir in 1608.
