= Bishandas =

Mughal miniature painter

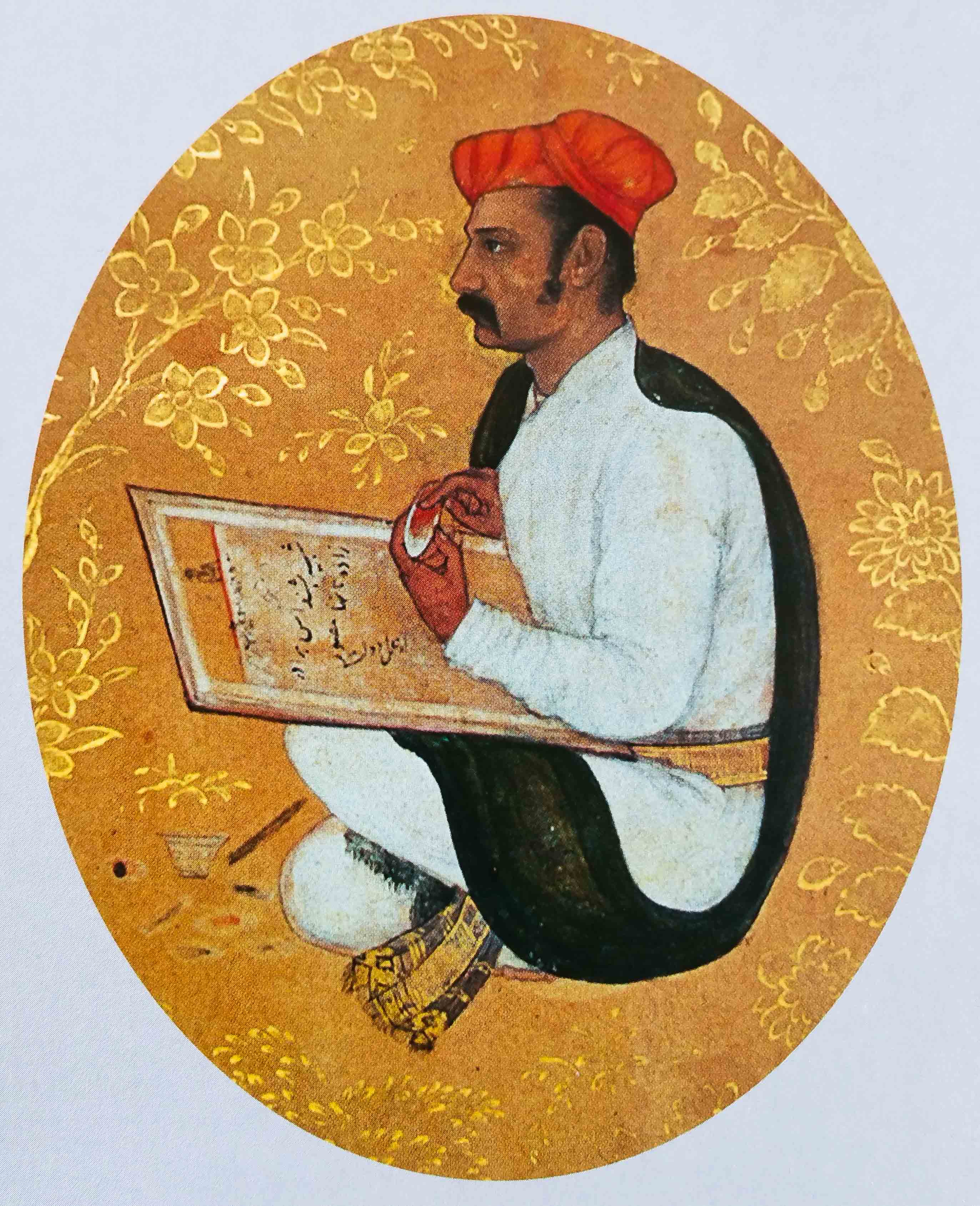
- Portrait of Bishandas by Daulat, c. 1610, detail of the border illumination, Golestan Palace Library, Tehran
- Style: Mughal
- Patrons: Jahangir and Shah Abbas I

Bishandas, also Bishan Das or Bishn Das, was an Indian painter during the Mughal era. He a court painter emperor Jahangir (1569–1627), specializing in portraits. Though little is known of Bishandas’ life, his name suggests he was a Hindu, like several others in the imperial workshop.

Bishandas had the reputation of being unequalled for his ability to create a realistic likeness of his models. He created realistic court and battle scenes. Jahangir especially sponsored realistic paintings and accurate portraiture. He praised Bishandas as "unrivalled in the art of portraiture".

Jahangir was so keen on obtaining realistic depictions of his contemporaries, possibly as a way to better understand their character and intentions, that in 1613 Bishandas was sent to accompany on a diplomatic mission to Persia led by Khan ‘Alam, to paint the portraits of Shah Abbas I of Persia (1571–1629) and other leading Persian figures such as Abbas's second son Soltan Mohammad Mirza, Saru Taqi or Isa Khan. There he was so successful that he remained until 1620, and on his return Jahangir gave him an elephant.

The portraits of the period are known to have been painted from life, because of the direct sketches made of their subjects, and because of the realistic, non-idealized, style their adopted. Bishandas was clearly influenced by the realistic European portraits he had seen in miniatures and engravings. Still, his creations were to some extent hampered by technical conventions, such as the regular need for full-length portraits, which gave less importance to the depiction of the face itself compared to European portraits, or the regular requirement to paint in profile.

== Gallery ==
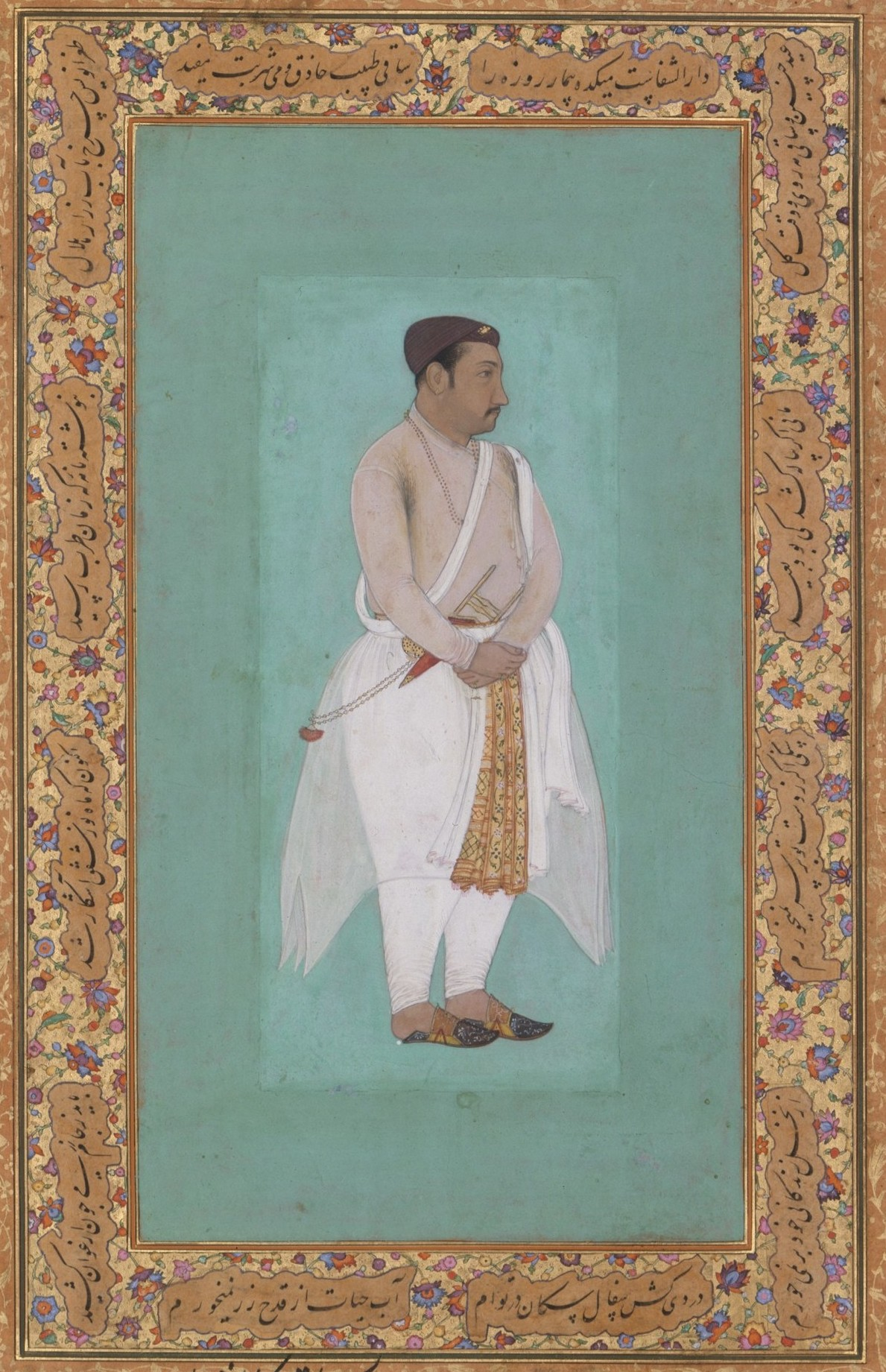
Portrait of Raja Suraj Singh of Jodhpur, Jahangir's brother in law.

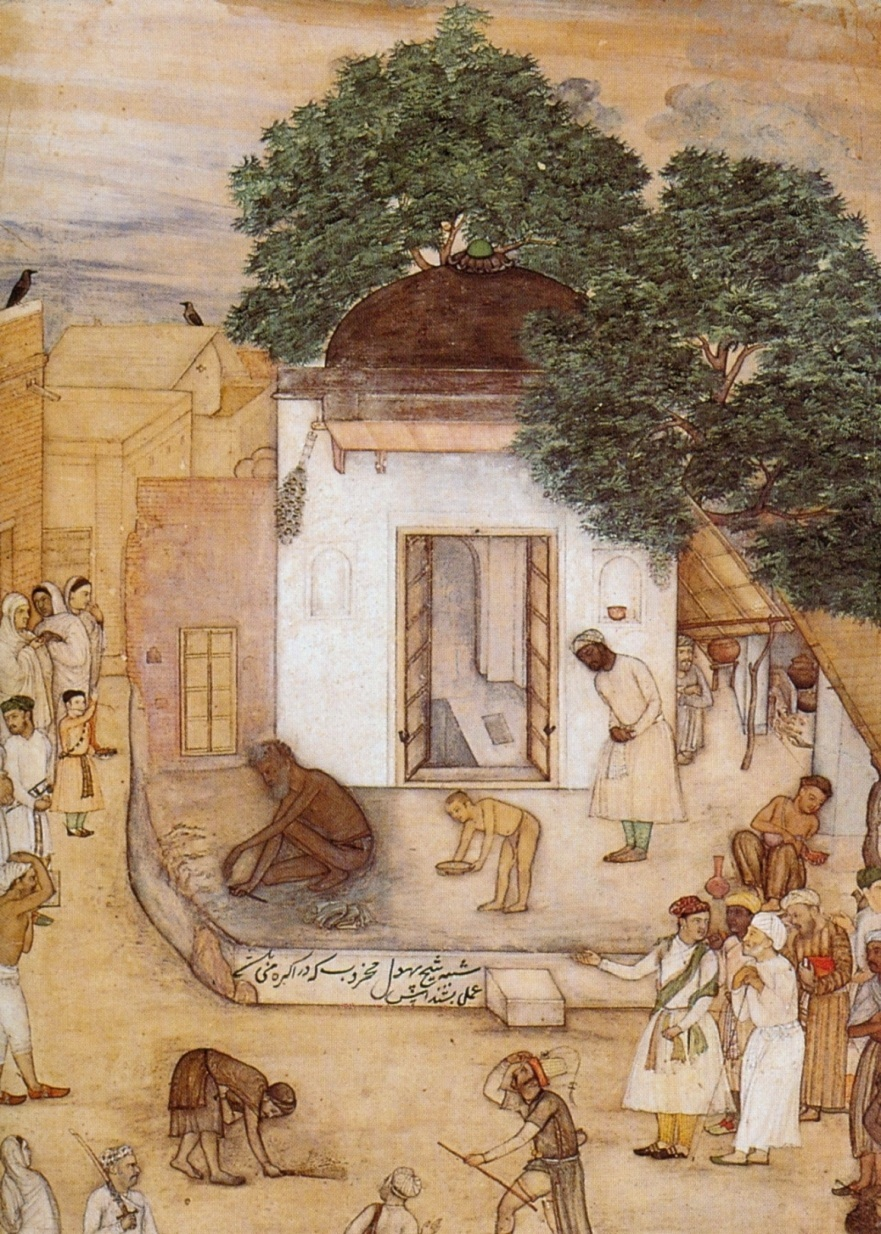
Shaikh Phul in His Hermitage, c. 1610

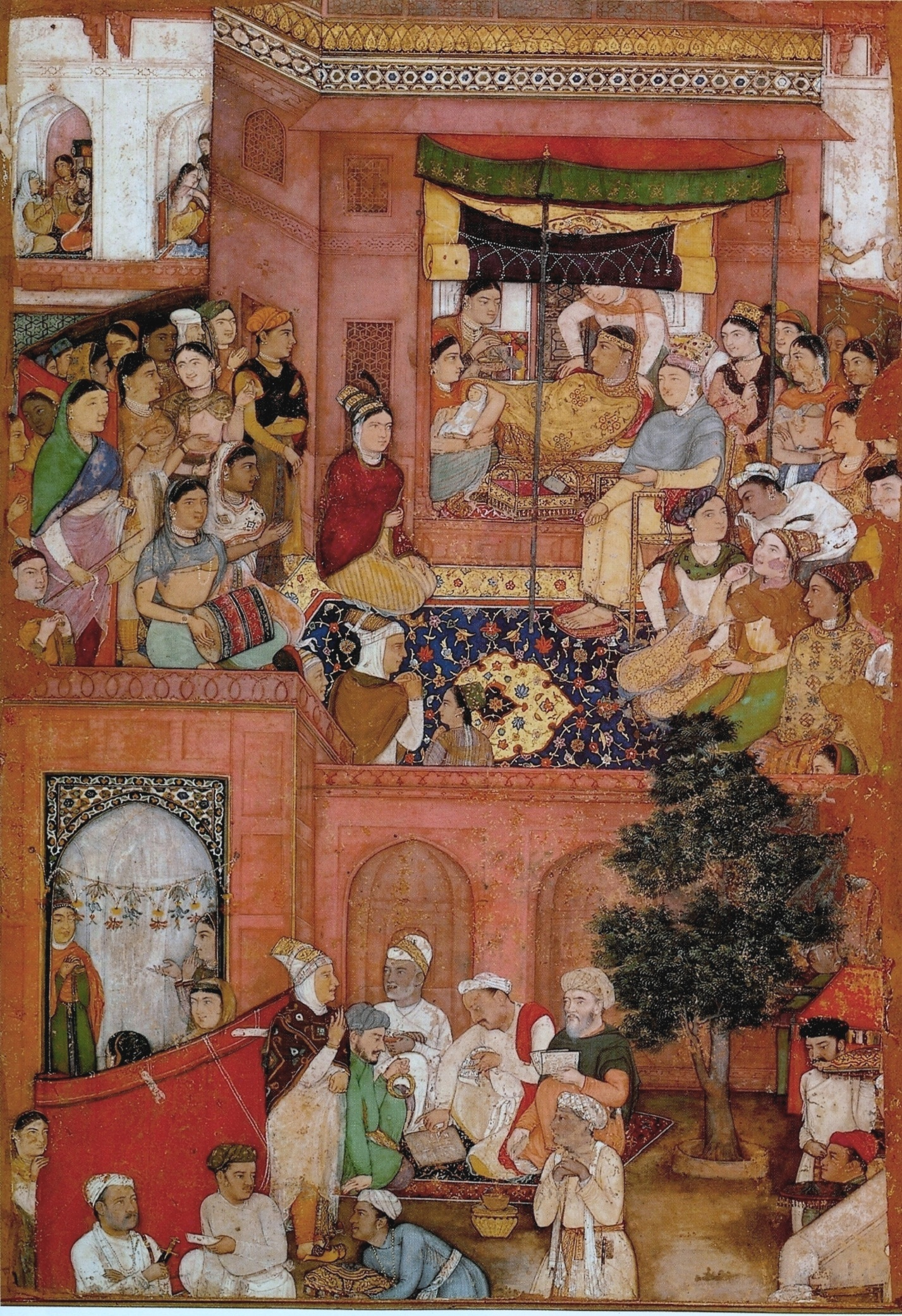
The Birth of a Prince, c. 1610–15, from a Jahangirnama (Tuzk-e-Jahangiri)

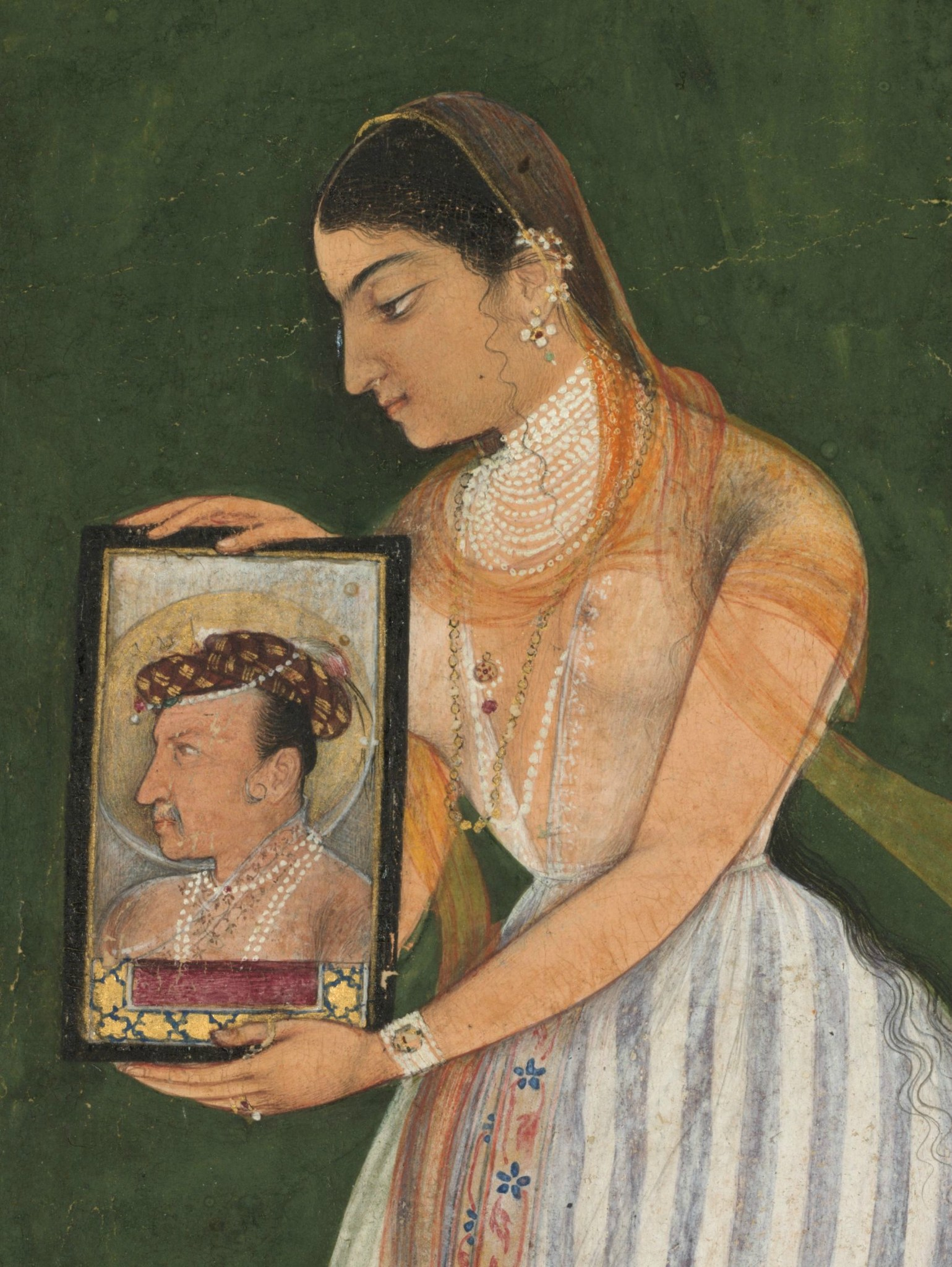
Nur Jahan holding a portrait of Jahangir, c. 1627 (detail)

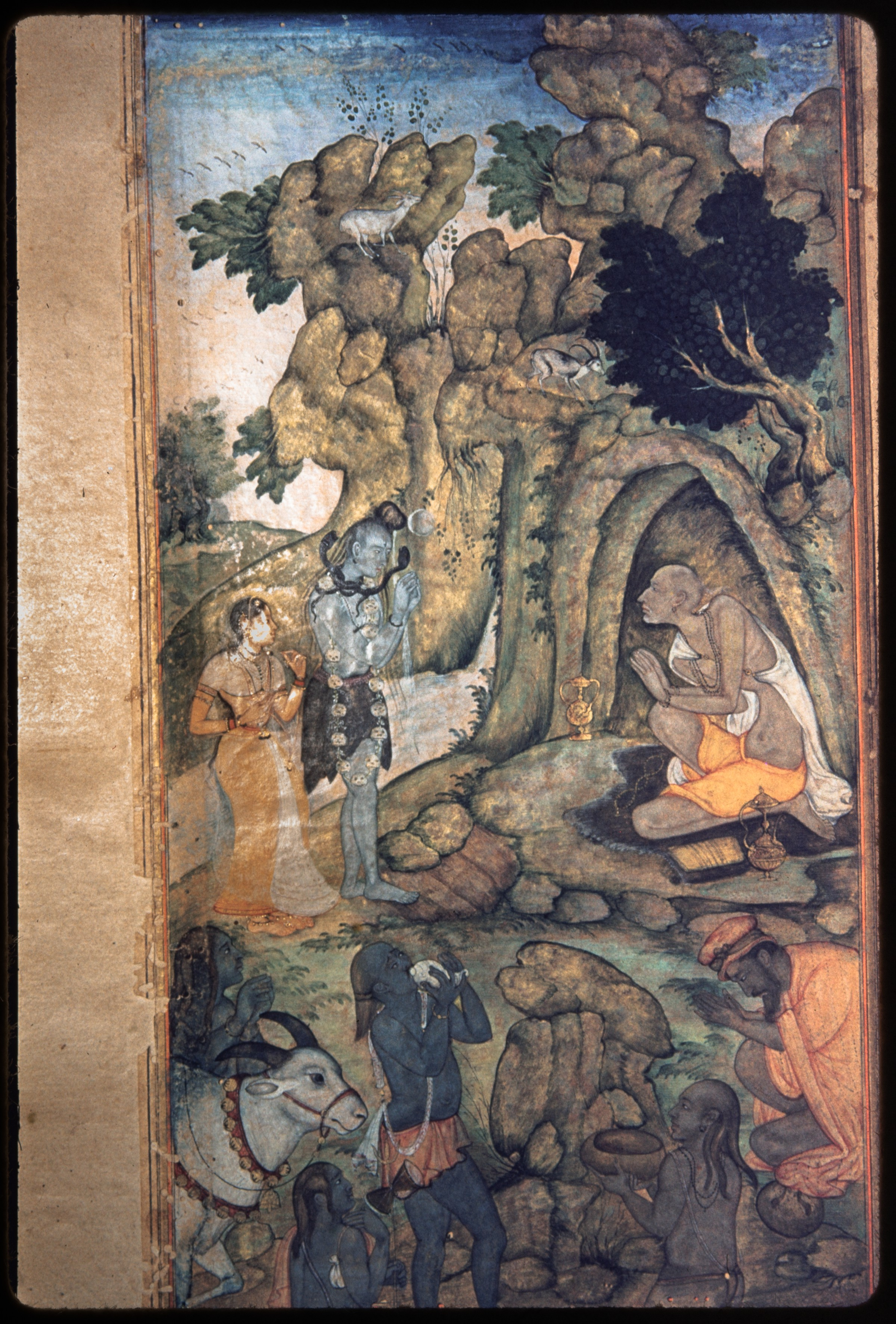
Vasiṣṭha Greets Shiva and Parvati, c. 1602

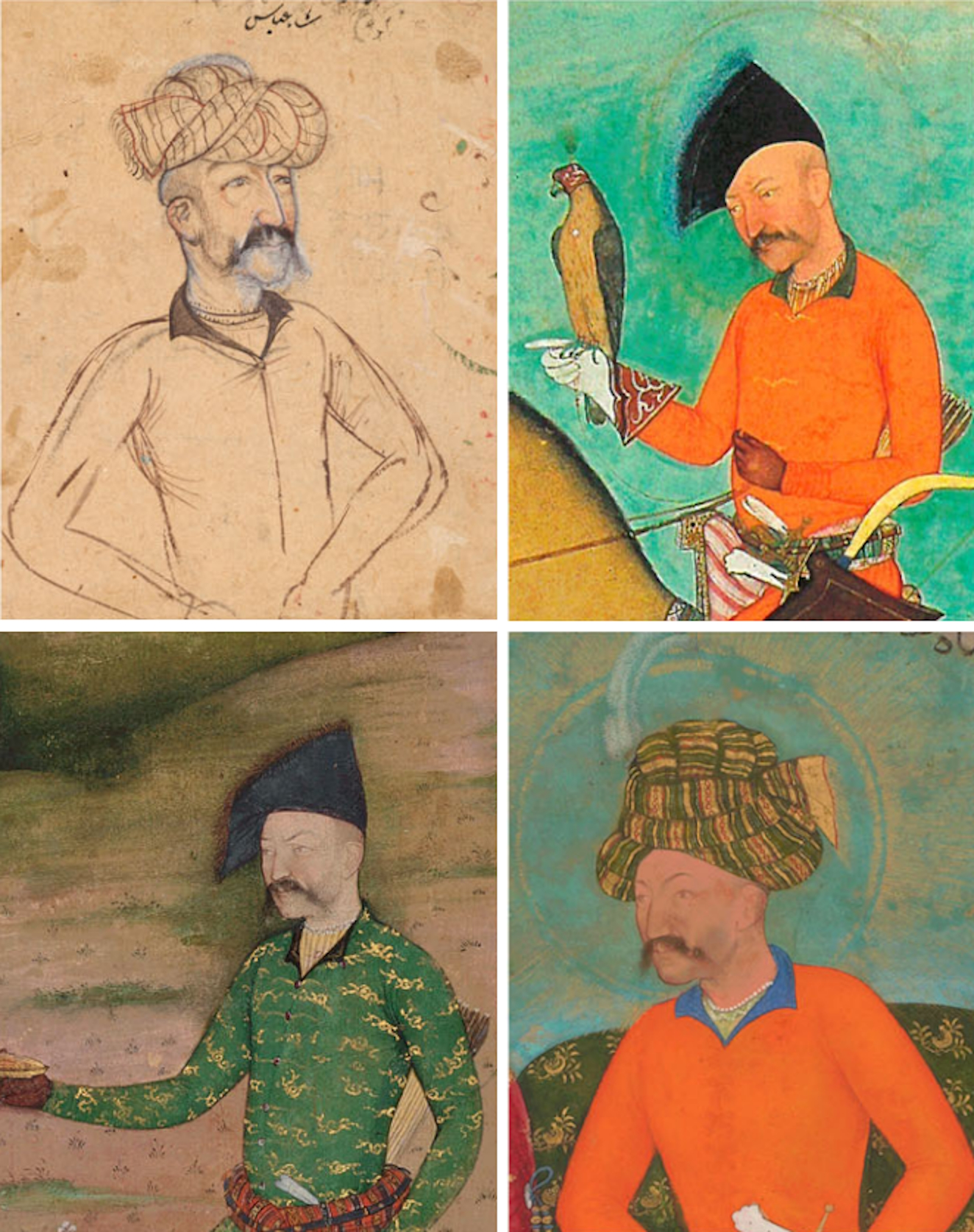
Portraits of Shah Abbas I by Bishandas (1615-1620).
