= Mandan Mishra =

Indian Sanskrit scholar (1929–2001)

- Born: 7 June 1929; Hanutiya (near Jaipur), Rajputana, India
- Died: 15 November 2001 (aged 72)
- Occupations: Sanskrit scholar, founder of Shri Lal Bahadur Shastri Rashtriya Sanskrit Vidyapeetha
- Awards: Padma Shri (2000)

Mandan Mishra (7 June 1929 – 15 November 2001) was a Sanskrit scholar from India and the founder of the Shri Shastri Rashtriya Sanskrit Vidyapeetha. In 2000, the Government of India awarded Mishra the Padma Shri by for his contributions to the field of Sanskrit.

== Early life and education ==
Mishra was born on 7 June 1929, in Hanutiya, a village approximately 50 kilometres from Jaipur.⁣⁣ His father, Shri Kanhiya Lal Mishra, was a Hinduism scholar, and his mother, Shrimati Manni Devi Mishra, was a housewife. The eldest of five brothers and two sisters, Mishra completed his primary education in Amarsar and pursued higher education under the guidance of Shri Pattabhiramshastriji. He married Bharti Mishra, and they had one daughter and three sons.

Mishra received his M.A. degree in Sanskrit at Gurukul Kangri University in Haridwar. He continued his education to receive his Ph.D. in Mimamsa at Rajasthan University in Jaipur.

== Career ==
Mishra started his career as a lecturer at Maharaja Sanskrit College in Jaipur, eventually becoming a professor. In 1956, he was elected as a Minister and, in 1959, as Minister-in-Chief of the All India Sanskrit Literature Association, an organization founded by Pt. Madan Mohan Malaviya to promote Sanskrit literature. Lal Bahadur Shastri obtained Mishra’s services from the Government of Rajasthan and appointed him as the permanent Director of Shri Lal Bahadur Shastri Sanskrit Vidyapeetha. Under his direction, the World Sanskrit Century Plan was initiated.

In 1961, a session of the All India Sanskrit Literature Association was held in Calcutta and inaugurated by the first President of India, Rajendra Prasad. This session led to the establishment of a Sanskrit Vidyapeetha in New Delhi. At the request of Rajendra Prasad and Narhar Vishnu, then chairperson of the association and Governor of Punjab, Balawant Nagesh Datar, Minister of State for Home, and Shanti Prasad secured Mishra's services from the Government of Rajasthan, leading to his move to Delhi and the founding of Sanskrit Vidyapeetha in 1962.

Through Mishra's efforts, the Government of India increased its assistance to Sanskrit Institutions, moving from a maximum allowance of ₹1,000 per month to substantial financial aid. Lal Bahadur Shastri became the chairman of All India Sanskrit Literature Association, and Mishra was re-elected as its Minister-in-Chief. Despite Shastri's request, Mishra declined to enter politics, choosing instead to dedicate his life to Sanskrit.

After the death of Lal Bahadur Shastri, Indira Gandhi took over as President of the Association and Vidyapeetha, following efforts by Mishra and a request from Sampurnanand. In honour of Shastri, she renamed the Vidyapeetha as Lal Bahadur Shastri Sanskrit Vidyapeetha and dedicated it to the Government of India. Mishra remained the founder and director of the Institution. In 1989, it became a university recognised by the government of India.

On 23 June 1989, the Indian Government appointed Mishra as its first Vice-Chancellor. On 1 January 1996, the Uttar Pradesh Administration reappointed Mishra as Vice-Chancellor of Sampurnanand Sanskrit University, ⁣⁣Varanasi⁣⁣. Mishra, as the vice-chancellor, also led a delegation of professors to the United States to promote the Sanskrit language.

Mishra founded Shri Pattaviram Shastri Veda Mimansa Research Centre in Varanasi to honor Acharya Shri Pattaviram Shastri. The centre iercurrently operating from a building in Varanasi. Kachi Shankaracharya nominated him as the founding chairman of the center.

== Death ==
Mishra died on 15 November 2001. He was survived by one daughter and three sons.
