= Gujarat under Jahangir =

The Mughal Empire's province Gujarat to the west of the Indian peninsula, was managed by the Viceroys appointed by the emperors. The emperor Jehangir continued Mírza Âzíz Kokaltásh as the viceroy when he ascended to the throne in 1605. He continued to manage the province even though Khalij Khan was appointed as the new viceroy. He was succeeded by Sayad Murtaza who controlled the rebellions in north and south Gujarat. Mírza Âzíz Kokaltásh again returned as the viceroy and successfully averted invasion of Malik Ambar from Daulatabad in south. The next viceroy Abdulláh Khán Fírúz Jang made expedition to south and subdued the Ahmednagar. During his time, in 1611, Jehangir permitted the British East India Company to establish factories in Surat and elsewhere in Gujarat. During the reign of the next viceroy Mukarrab Khán, Jehangir toured Gujarat and received several local rulers. In 1618, he appointed his son prince Shah Jahan as the next viceroy. He rebelled in 1622–23 and he was replaced by Sultán Dáwar Baksh. Shah Jahan resisted but later he managed the Jehangir's new appointment, Khán Jahán as his own. Saif Khan had managed the province instead as Khan Jahan was sent as Shah Jahan's ambassador to Jehangir. Jehangir died and Shah Jahan succeeded him as the emperor in 1627.

== Viceroys under Jehangir (1605–1627) ==
=== Mírza Âzíz Kokaltásh, Ninth Viceroy, 1600–1606 ===
In 1600, Mírza Âzíz Kokaltásh was appointed the viceroy of Gujarát third time by Mughal emperor Akbar and Shams-ud-dín Husain was appointed as his deputy to Áhmedábád. In 1602, Mírza Âzíz sent his eldest son Shádmán as deputy; his second son Khurram as governor of Junagadh; and Sayad Báyazíd as minister. Khurram was afterward relieved of the charge of Sorath and Junagaḍh by his brother Abdulláh.

In 1605, Jehangir succeeded Akbar to the imperial throne. Shortly after his accession, Jehangir published a decree remitting certain taxes, and also in cases of robbery fixing the responsibility on the landowners of the place where the robbery was committed. The decree also renewed Akbar's decree forbidding soldiers billetting themselves forcibly in cultivators' houses. Finally, it directed that dispensaries and hospital wards should be opened in all large towns. In the early days of Jehángír's reign disturbance was caused in the neighbourhood of Áhmedábád by Bahádur a son of Muzaffar Sháh. Jehángír despatched Patrdás Rája Vikramájit as viceroy of Gujarát to put down the rising. The Rája’s arrival at Áhmedábád restored order. Some of the rebel officers submitting were reinstated in their commands: the rest fled to the hills.

=== Kalíj Khán, Tenth Viceroy, 1606 and Sayad Murtaza, Eleventh Viceroy, 1606–1609 ===
On the Rája’s return, Jehángír appointed Kalíj Khán to be viceroy of Gujarát; but Kalíj Khán never joined his charge, allowing Mírza Âzíz Kokaltásh to act in his place. In 1606, on the transfer of Mírza Âzíz to the Lahore viceroyalty, Sayad Murtaza Khán Bukhári, who had recently been ennobled in consequence of crushing the rebellion under Jehángír’s son Khusrao, was entrusted with the charge of Gujarát, Sayad Báyazíd being continued as minister. Sayad Murtaza, who is said to have further ingratiated himself with the emperor by the present of a magnificent ruby, appears to have been more of a scholar than a governor. His only notable acts were the repair of the fort of Kadi and the populating of the Bukhára quarter of Ahmedabad. During his tenure of power disturbances broke out, and Rái Gopináth, son of Rája Todar Mal, with Rája Sursingh of Jodhpur, were sent to Gujarát by way of Malwa, Surat and Baroda. They overcame and imprisoned Kalián, chief of Belpár, (Note: Belpár, belonging to the Thákor of Umeta in the Rewa Kántha.) but were defeated by the Mándwa (Note: This Mándwa is probably the Mándwa near Atarsumba, but it may be Mándwa on the Narmada river in the Rewa Kantha. Atarsumba is about ten miles west of Kapadvanj in Kheda district.) chieftain, and withdrew to Áhmedábád. Rái Gopináth, obtaining reinforcements, returned to Mándwa and succeeded in capturing the chief. He then marched against the rebellious Kolis of the Kánkrej, and took prisoner their leader, whom, on promising not to stir up future rebellions, he afterwards restored to liberty.

The first connection of the English with Gujarát dates from Sayad Murtaza’s viceroyalty. In 1608, he allowed Captain Hawkins to sell goods in Surat.

=== Mírza Âzíz Kokaltásh, Twelfth Viceroy, 1609–1611 ===
In 1609, the Khán-i-Ázam Mírza Âzíz Kokaltásh was for the fourth time appointed viceroy of Gujarát. He was allowed to remain at court and send his son Jehángír Kúli Khán as his deputy with Mohandás Diván and Masûd Beg Hamadáni. This was the beginning of government by deputy, a custom which in later times proved problematic to the Mughal interests.

Sack of Surat by Malik Âmbar, 1609

In 1609 Malik Âmbar, chief minister of Murtaza Nizam Shah II’s court and governor of Daulatabad, invaded Gujarát at the head of 50,000 horse, and after plundering both the Surat and Baroda districts retired as quickly as he came. To prevent such raids a body of 25,000 men was posted at Rámnagar (near Dharampur) on the Dakhan (Deccan) frontier, and remained there for four years. This force included 4000 men from the Viceroy of Áhmedábád, 5000 men from the Nobles of his Court, 3000 men from Baglan, 2500 men from the son of the chief of Cutch, 2500 men from Nawanagar, 2000 from Idar, 2000 from Dungarpur, 2000 from Banswada, 1000 from Ramnagar of Dharampur, 1000 from Rajpipla, 300 from Ali, 350 from Mohan (Chhota Udaipur.

=== Abdulláh Khán Fírúz Jang, Thirteenth Viceroy, 1611–1616 ===
In 1611, Abdulláh Khán Bahádur Fírúz Jang was appointed the thirteenth viceroy of Gujarát, with Ghiás-ud-dín as his minister, under orders to proceed to the Dakhan (Deccan) to avenge the recent inroad. The viceroy marched to the Dakhan (Deccan) but returned without effecting anything. In 1616, he was again, in company with prince Shah Jahan, directed to move against Ahmednagar. This second expedition was successful. The country was humbled, and, except Malik Ambar, most of the nobles submitted to the emperor. During this viceroy’s term of office an imperial decree was issued forbidding nobles on the frontiers and in distant provinces to affix their seals to any communications addressed to Mughal servants.

In 1611, the English East India Company sent vessels to trade with Surat. The Portuguese made an armed resistance, but were defeated. The Mughal commander, who was not sorry to see the Portuguese beaten, gave the English a warm reception. In 1612–13, a factory was opened in Surat by the English, and in 1614 a fleet was kept in the Tápti River under Captain Downton to protect the factory. In 1615, Sir Thomas Roe came as ambassador to the emperor Jehángír, and obtained permission to establish factories, not only at Surat but also at Bharuch, Cambay and Ghogha. The factory at Ghogha seems to have been established in 1613. The emperor Jehángír notes in his memoirs that Mukarrab Khán, viceroy from 1616–1618, regardless of cost had bought from the English at Ghogha a turkey, a lemur and other curiosities. On his return from Jehángír’s camp at Ahmedabad in January 1618, Roe obtained valuable concessions from the viceroy. The governor of Surat was to lend ships to the English, the resident English might carry arms, build a house, practise their religion, and settle their disputes. The Dutch closely followed the English at Surat and were established there in 1618.

=== Mukarrab Khán, Fourteenth Viceroy, 1616 ===
In 1616, on their return to Delhi, Mukarrab Khán, a surgeon who had risen to notice by curing the emperor Akbar and was ennobled by Jehángír, and who, since 1608, had been in charge of Surat or of Cambay, was appointed fourteenth viceroy of Gujarát, with Muhammad Safi as his minister.

In the following year (1617), the emperor Jehángír came to Gujarát to hunt wild elephants in the Dahod forests. But owing to the density of the forest only twelve were captured. Early in 1618, he visited Cambay which he notes only vessels of small draught could reach and where he ordered a gold and silver tanka twenty times heavier than the gold mohar to be minted.

From Cambay, after a stay of ten days, he went to Áhmedábád in hot season of March 1618 and received the Rája of Ídar. In his memoir, he contented himself with abusing its sandy streets, calling the city the ‘abode of dust’ (gardábád). After an attack of fever his dislike grew stronger, and he was uncertain whether the ‘home of the simoom’ (samumistán), the ‘place of sickness’ (bímáristán), the ‘thorn brake’ (zakumdár), or ‘hell’ (jahánnamábád), was its most fitting name. Even the last title did not satisfy his dislike. In derision he adds the verse, "Oh essence of all goodnesses by what name shall I call thee." (Note: Elliot’s History of India, VI. 358; Jehángír’s Memoirs Persian Text, 231.) Of the old buildings of Áhmedábád, the emperor speaks of the Kankaria Lake and its island garden and of the royal palaces in the Bhadra. He notes that his Bakhshi had repaired the Kánkaria lake and that the viceroy Mukarrab Khán had partly restored the Bhadra palaces against his arrival. The emperor was disappointed with the capital. After the accounts he had heard it seemed rather poor with its narrow streets, its shops with ignoble fronts, and its dust, though to greet the emperor as he came on elephant-back scattering gold the city and its population had put on their holiday dress. The emperor speaks of having met some of the great men of Gujarát. Chief among these was Sayad Muhammad Bukhári the representative of Sháh-i-Álam and the sons of Sháh Wajíh-ud-dín of Áhmedábád. They came as far as Cambay to meet the emperor. After his arrival in the capital Jehángír with great kindness informally visited the house and garden of Sikandar Gujaráti the author of the Mirăt-i-Sikandari, to pick some of the author’s famous figs off the trees. Jehángír speaks of the historian as a man of a refined literary style well versed in all matters of Gujarát history, who six or seven years since had entered the imperial service. On the occasion of celebrating Sháh Jehán’s twenty-seventh birthday at Áhmedábád, Jehángír records having granted the territory from Mandu to Cambay as the estate of his son Shah Jahan (Prince Khurram). Before leaving Gujarát the emperor ordered the expulsion of the Sevadas or Jain priests, because of a prophecy unfavourable to him made by Mán Sing Sewda.

As the climate of Áhmedábád disagreed with him, Jehángír retired to the banks of the Mahi River. Here the Jám of Nawanagar State came to pay homage, and presented fifty Kutch horses, a hundred gold mohars, and a hundred rupees, and received a dress of honour. The emperor now returned to Áhmedábád, where he was visited by Rái Bharmalji of Kutch, who presented 100 Kutchi horses, 100 ashrafis and 2000 rupees. The Rái, who was ninety years of age, had never paid his respects to any emperor. Jehángír, much pleased with the greatest of Gujarát Zamíndárs, who, in spite of his ninety years was hale and in full possession of all his senses, gave him his own horse, a male and female elephant, a dagger, a sword with diamond-mounted hilt, and four rings of different coloured precious stones. As he still suffered from the climate, the emperor set out to return to Agra, and just at that time (1618–19) he heard of the birth of a grandson, Aurangzeb who was born at Dahod in Gujarát. In honour of this event Sháh Jehán held a great festival at Ujjain.

=== Prince Sháh Jahán, Fifteenth Viceroy, 1618–1622 ===
Before the emperor started for Ágra, he appointed prince Shah Jahan fifteenth viceroy of Gujarát in the place of Mukarrab Khán. Muhammad Safi was continued as minister. As Sháh Jahán preferred remaining at Ujjain, he chose Rustam Khán as his deputy; but the emperor, disapproving of this choice, selected Rája Vikramájit in Rustam Khán’s stead.

Shortly after, in 1622–23, Sháh Jahán rebelled, and in one of the battles which took place Rája Vikramájit was killed. Sháh Jahán, during his viceroyalty, built the Sháhi Bágh and the royal baths in the Bhadra at Áhmedábád. After the death of Vikramájit, his brother succeeded as deputy viceroy.

=== Sultán Dáwar Baksh, Sixteenth Viceroy, 1622–1624 ===
While Sháh Jahán was still in rebellion, the emperor appointed Sultán Dáwar Baksh, the son of prince Khusrau, sixteenth viceroy of Gujarát, Muhammad Safi being retained in his post of minister. Sháh Jahán, who was then at Mándu in Malwa, appointed on his part Abdulláh Khán Bahádur Fírúz Jang viceroy and a khájahsara or eunuch of Abdulláh Khán his minister. Sultán Dáwar Baksh, the emperor’s nominee, was accompanied by Khán-i-Ázam Mírza Âzíz Kokaltásh to instruct him in the management of affairs. Prince Sháh Jahán had directed his minister to carry away all the treasure; but Muhammad Safi, who appears to have been a man of great ability, at once imprisoned the prince’s partisans in Áhmedábád, and, among others, captured the eunuch of Abdulláh Khán. When this news reached the prince at Mándu, he sent Abdulláh Khán Bahádur with an army to Gujarát by way of Baroda. Muhammad Safi Khán met and defeated him, and forced him to fly and rejoin the prince at Mándu. For his gallant conduct Muhammad Safi received the title of Saif Khán, with an increase in his monthly pay from Rupees 700 to 3000 and the command of 3000 horse. Meanwhile, Sultán Dáwar Baksh, with the Khán-i-Ázam, arrived and assumed the charge of the government, but the Khán-i-Ázam died soon after in 1624, and was buried at Sarkhej.

=== Saif Khán, Seventeenth Viceroy, 1624–1627 ===
Sultán Dáwar Baksh was re-called, and Khán Jahán was appointed deputy viceroy with Yúsuf Khán as his minister. On his arrival at Áhmedábád, prince Sháh Jahán employed Khán Jahán in his own service, and sent him as his ambassador to the emperor. Saif Khán, who acted for him, may be called the seventeenth viceroy, as indeed he had been the governing spirit for the last eight or ten years. He held the post of viceroy of Gujarát until the death of the Jahangir in 1627.

== List of Viceroys under Jehangir (1605–1627) ==
- Mírza Âzíz Kokaltásh, Ninth Viceroy, 1600–1606 (third time)
- Kalíj Khán, Tenth Viceroy, 1606
- Sayad Murtaza, Eleventh Viceroy, 1606–1609
- Mírza Âzíz Kokaltásh, Twelfth Viceroy, 1609–1611 (fourth time)
- Abdulláh Khán Fírúz Jang, Thirteenth Viceroy, 1611–1616
- Mukarrab Khán, Fourteenth Viceroy, 1616
- Prince Shah Jahan, Fifteenth Viceroy, 1618–1622
- Sultán Dáwar Baksh, Sixteenth Viceroy, 1622–1624
- Saif Khán, Seventeenth Viceroy, 1624–1627
