= Sur Singh =

Raja of Marwar from 1595 to 1619

Sawai Raja Soor Singh
- Sawai Raja of Marwar
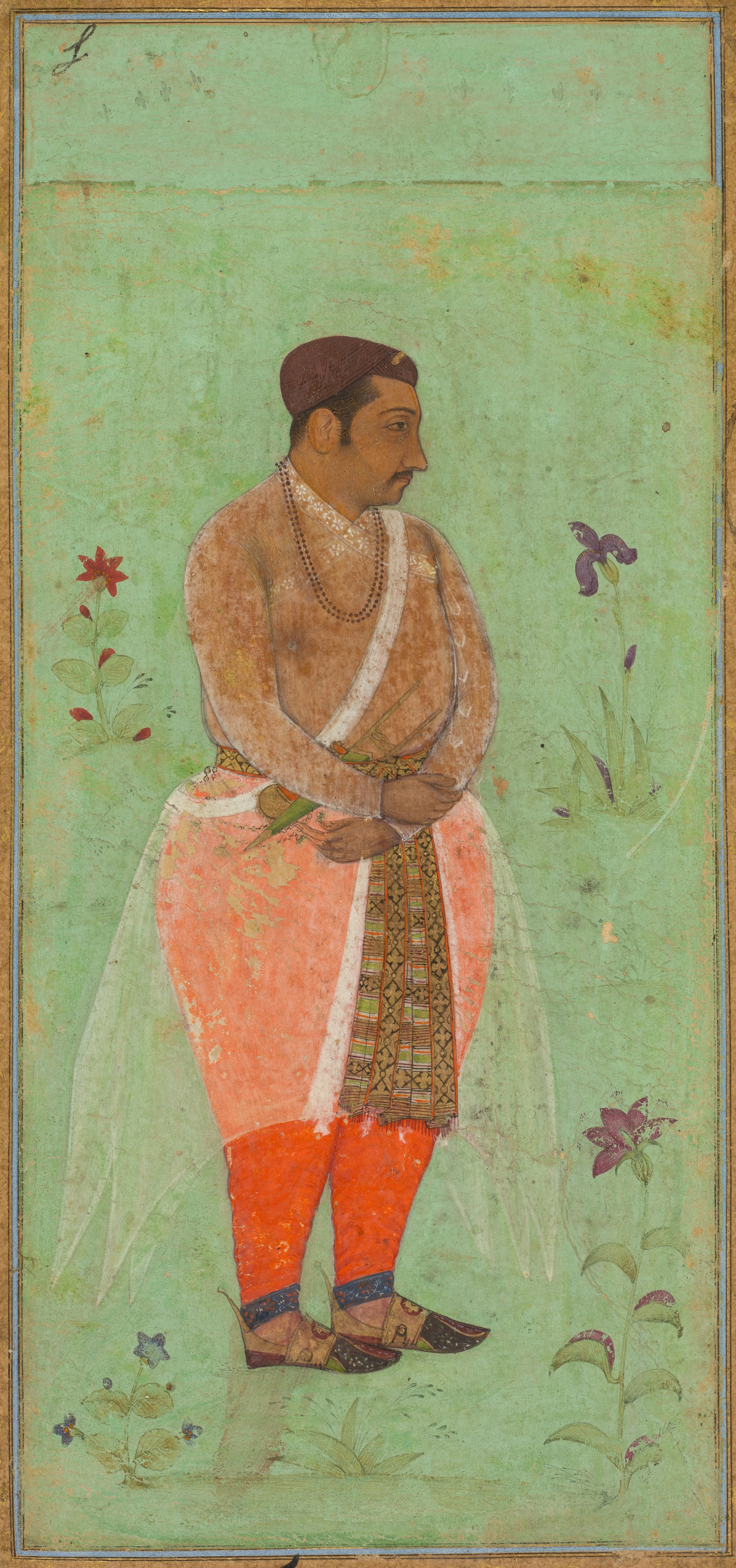

Raja of Marwar
- Tenure: 11 July 1595 – 7 September 1619
- Coronation: 23 July 1595, Sringar Chowki, Mehrangarh Fort, Jodhpur, Marwar
- Predecessor: Raja Udai Singh Rathore
- Successor: Maharaja Gaj Singh Rathore
- Born: Suraj Mal; 24 April 1571; Delhi, Subah of Delhi, Mughal Empire
- Died: 7 September 1619 (aged 48); Mahaikat, Deccan, Mughal Empire
- Spouses: Sisodiniji Manorath Deiji of Mewar; Bhatiyaniji Sujan Deiji of Pugal; Kachwahiji Saubhag Deiji of Amber; Ahadiji Jasoda Deiji of Dungarpur; Chudasamanji Suhag Deiji of Junagadh; Parmarji Chaturang Deiji of Malpura; Jadejiji Laad Deiji of Jamnagar; Sodhiji (Parmarji) Uchrang Deiji of Amarkot; Devadiji Heera Deiji of Sirohi; Solankiniji Navrang Deiji of Virpur; Bhatiyaniji Parvati Deiji of Jaisalmer; Parmarji Ganga Deiji of Malpura; Kachwahiji Amar Deiji of Amarsar; Kachwahiji Shringar Deiji of Amber
- Issue: Jaswant Singh (died infant); Pratap Singh (died infant); Maharaja Gaj Singh Rathore; Sabal Singh; Viram Dev (died young); Vijay Singh (died young); Manbhawat Deiji m.to Mughal Prince Parvez; Kalyan Deiji (died young); Aas Deiji m.to Mirza Raja Bhau Singh of Amber; Mrig Deiji m.to Mirza Raja Jai Singh I of Amber; Indra Deiji (died young)
Names
- Sawai Raja Soor Singh Rathore
- House: House of Rathore
- Father: Raja Udai Singh Rathore
- Mother: Kachwahiji Rajawatji Manrang Deiji d.of Raja Askaran of Amber later Gwalior
- Religion: Hinduism
- Occupation: Mughal General, Commander

Sawai Raja Soor Singh (Suraj Mal; 24 April 1571 – 7 September 1619) also known as Suraj Singh was the Rathore Rajput ruler of the Kingdom of Marwar from 11 July 1595 until his death in 1619. His uterine sister Manwati Deiji also known as Bilqis Makani was the chief consort of Mughal Emperor Jahangir and mother of his successor Mughal Emperor Shah Jahan making him along with Kishan Singh founder of Kishangarh maternal uncles of Shah Jahan.

== Early life ==
Suraj Mal was the son of Raja Udai Singh, the ruler of Marwar. His mother was Rajavat Kachwahi Manrang Deviji, the principal wife of his father, and the daughter of Raja Askaran of Narwar, who was also briefly Raja of Amber before being ousted in favour of his uncle, Bharmal.

He was the elder full brother of Mani Bai, through whom he was the maternal uncle of Prince Khurram; and of Kishan Singh, the founder of the Kingdom of Kishangarh.

== Reign ==
Sur Singh succeeded his father upon his death, and he was given tilak by Akbar on 23 July 1595. Akbar bestowed upon him 16 parganas and a mansab of 2000 Zat and Sawar.

He was sent to look into the affairs of Gujarat in the absence of Prince Murad who had left for Deccan. In 1597, a revolt broke out in Gujarat, and he was appointed to take the expedition against Bahadur, son of Muzaffar Gujrati. However Bahadur fled away the field without facing the besieging army. In 1599, he was sent to assist Daniyal Mirza in the conquest of the Deccan for Emperor Akbar. In 1604 on the request of Daniyal Mirza, he was allowed to return to Jodhpur and was granted Jaitaran and western half of Merta pargana. He received the hereditary title of Sawai Raja in recognition of his many services.

Under the reign of Jahangir, in 1607 he was sent to put down the rebellion in Gujarat. On 1608, he attended the court of Jahangir and presented a poet who wrote verse in the Hindi language. Later that year, he was granted 3000 Zat and 2000 Sawar. In 1613, he was granted the pargana of Phalodi and was deputed by the Emperor along with Prince Khurram to undertake the expedition of Mewar. The local knowledge by the Raja fully utilised by Khurram against the Rana of Mewar and various outpost were established on his suggestion. In 1615, he was promoted to rank of 5000 Zat and 3300 Sawar and was posted to Deccan to subdue the various rebelling vassals. At his departure, a robe of honour along with a horse was bestowed upon him.

== Death ==
He died on active service at Mahaikat, Deccan on 7 September 1619.

On his death, the Emperor Jahangir had remarked:

Rāja Sūraj Singh, through the advantage of his being brought up by the late king (Akbar), and this suppliant at the throne of God, reached high rank and great dignities. His territory surpassed that of his father or grandfather.

— Jahangir, Mughal Emperor

According to Khyats, at the time of his death, Sur Singh's sway extended over Jodhpur, Siwana, Jaitaran, Jalor, Satalmar, Sojat, Merta, Phalodi, Sanchor, Terwada, Merwada, villages of Gorwada, Ratlam and Bhatnagar in Malwa, Chorgaon in Deccan and Radhanpur in Gujarat.

He was succeeded by his son Gaj Singh.

== Ancestry ==
Ancestors of Sur Singh

8. Ganga, Rao of Marwar
4. Maldeo, Rao of Marwar
9. Padma Bai of Sirohi
2. Udai Singh, Raja of Marwar
10. Jaito Sajavat Of Khairawa
5. Swarup Devi
1. Sur Singh
12. Bhim Singh, Raja of Amber
6. Askaran, Raja of Narwar
3. Manrang Devi

== See also ==
- Rulers of Marwar
