= Virpur =

Virpur may refer to the following places in the state of Gujarat, western India:

- Virpur (Rajkot), in Rajkot district
  - Virpur-Kherdi State, former Indian princely state with seat in the above town
  - Virpur railway station
- Virpur (Mahisagar), alias Birpur, in Mahisagar district

== See also ==
- Veerpur, village in Etawah district, Uttar Pradesh, India
- Veerapur, village in Karnataka, India
- Veerapuram 220, a 2021 Indian film
