= Anara Begum =

Concubine of Gaj Singh I of Marwar

- Consort of: Gaj Singh I
- Issue: Sugdha (daughter)
- House: Rathore (by service)
- Religion: Islam

Anara Begum (Marwari: अनारा बेगम) was the concubine of Gaj Singh I, the Rathore ruler of the Kingdom of Marwar from 1619 until his death in 1638. Described as the "red hot favourite concubine of Gaj Singh", she played an instrumental role in the selection of Jaswant Singh as heir over his elder brother Amar Singh Rathore.

== Biography ==
According to Jodhpur-ri-khyat, a historical chronicle of Marwar region, Anara Begum was originally the wife of a Muslim Nawab of Delhi. She caught the attention of Gaj Singh I, the Maharaja of Marwar, who abducted her and took her into his household as a khawas (concubine). She is mentioned to be of Turkish descent. The identity of her husband remains uncertain. Alternative narratives suggest Anara herself had requested Gaj Singh to orchestrate her abduction following their meeting at the Mughal court in Agra. According to the source, the Nawab came to accept his wife's elopement on the pretext of "the love the Maharaja and his concubine exhibited".

Despite her status as a khawas, Anara gradually assumed a significant role in the royal household. However, her presence in the ranivas was unwelcome among the Rajput wives of Gaj Singh. Tensions emerged between Anara and Gaj's elder son Amar Singh Rathore, as well as his mother, Mansukh Chauhanji Deiji, leading to Anara's eventual confinement in a Jaipur palace.

Anara had a daughter named Sugdha with Gaj Singh.

A pair of pearl-encrusted shoes, believed to have belonged to Anara Begum, are preserved in the Rang Mahal of Jaipur.

== Role in Jaswant Singh's succession ==
Following the death of Gaj Singh in 1638, Anara played a pivotal role in the selection of second-born Jaswant Singh as heir over Gaj Singh's elder son, Amar Singh Rathore. Amar Singh was granted the territory of Nagore as a form of compensation. This succession arrangement received the approval of the contemporary Mughal Empire, which favored weakened Rajput unity.

A 19th-century British account by Kaviraj Shyamaldas suggests that Amar Singh resented Anara due to her lower status, whereas Jaswant Singh showed her respect. This influenced Anara to advocate for Jaswant's nomination as successor. She also justified the decision by suggesting that Amar Singh, being young, could establish his own domain independently in Nagore. Anara maintained her position within the courts of both Gaj Singh and Jaswant Singh, and either of the two is credited with excavating a locally famous baori in Jodhpur in her honor.

== Death ==
In the Jodhpur khyat, Anara is mentioned to have been killed along with her daughter during a battle between Rajputs and Mughals.

== In literature ==
- Anara is a character in Bholashankar Vyas' historical fiction novel Samudra Sangam (2004).

== See also ==
- Ruhani Bai Begum
