= Veerpur =

Village in Uttar Pradesh, India

Coordinates: 26°37′40.8″N 79°16′4.8″E

Veerpur is a village of Etawah district, Uttar Pradesh, located about 1 kilometre (0.62 mi) from Aheripur.
