= Soltan Mohammad Mirza =

Third known son of Safavid Shah Abbas the Great

Reza Khodabandeh Mirza
- Soltan
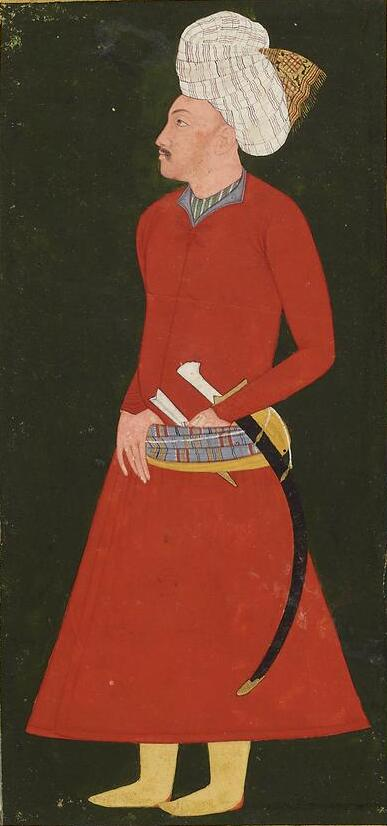
- Mughal painting of Soltan Mohammad Mirza, by or after Bishandas. Dated 1605–1627
- Born: 18 March 1597/98; Qazvin, Safavid Iran
- Died: August 1632; Alamut, Safavid Iran
- Issue: Gawhar Shad Begum
- Dynasty: Safavid
- Father: Abbas I

Soltan Mohammad Mirza (Persian: سلطان محمد میرزا), also known as Ruzak Mirza or Reza Khodabandeh Mirza (18 March 1597/98, Qazvin – August 1632, Alamut, Qazvin). After his grandfather, was the third known son of Safavid Shah Abbas the Great (r. 1588-1629).

== Life ==
He was born in 1597 or 1598 and was blinded in 1620–21 on the orders of his father.

In 1620 Shah Abbas fell ill with a feverish sickness that swept through his court at Farahabad Complex on the Caspian Sea. Some of his courtiers and many local people died, and for a time it appeared that the shah’s life too was in danger. During this event, Khodabandeh Mirza, who had survived thought that Abbas would die and prepare for his accession to the throne with support of Qizilbash commanders. However, the Shah recovered and punished his son by blinding him. But the prince's supporters were determined to put him on the throne. The plan was to kidnap the prince from palace and proclaim him Shah outside. However, the plan was discovered and all participants were punished. The prince himself was arrested and imprisoned in the Alamut and executed during the reign of Safi.

== Issue ==
He had a daughter named Gawhar Shad Begum, she married with Mirza Qazi, the Shaykh al-Islām of Isfahan.

== See also ==
- Mohammad Baqer Mirza
- Mohammad Khodabanda

== Sources ==
- Canby, Sheila R. (2009). Shah ʻAbbas: The Remaking of Iran. British Museum Press. ISBN 978-0-7141-2452-0.
- Roemer, H. R. (1986). "The Safavid Period". In Lockhart, Laurence; Jackson, Peter (eds.). The Cambridge History of Iran: The Timurid and Safavid Periods. Vol. 6. Cambridge: Cambridge University Press. ISBN 0-521-20094-6.
- Blow, David (2009). Shah Abbas: The Ruthless King Who Became an Iranian Legend. Bloomsbury Academic.
- Savory, Roger M. (1980). Iran under the Safavids. Cambridge University Press. ISBN 9780521042512.
- Nahavandi, Houchang; Bomati, Yves (1998). Shah Abbas, Empereur de Perse: 1587–1629 (in French). Paris: Perrin. ISBN 9782262011314. LCCN 99161812.
