= Shaikh Farid Bukhari =

Mughal noble (died 1616)

Murtaza Khan Sheikh Farid Bukhari
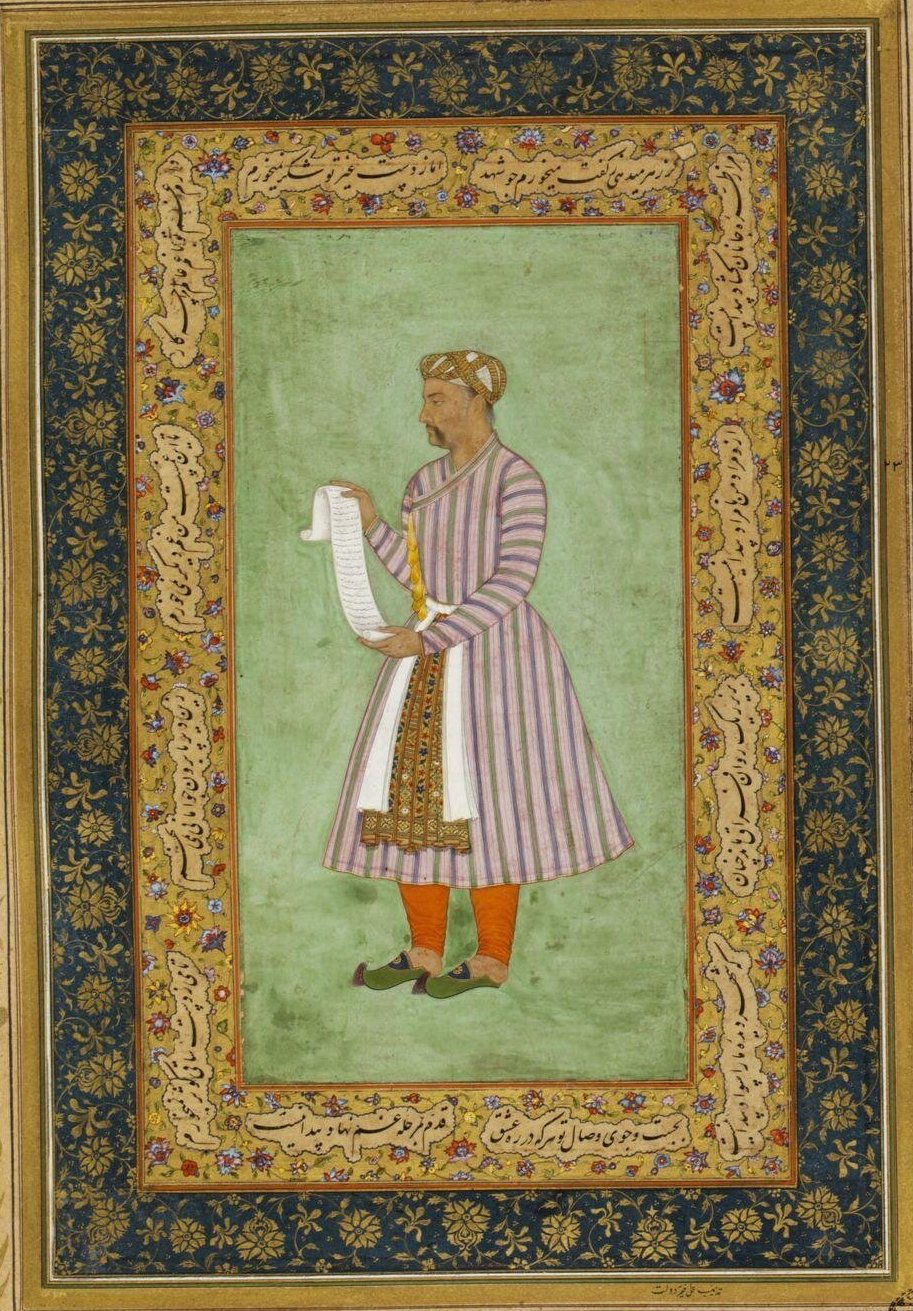
- Portrait of Murtaza Khan by Manohar Das and Muhammad Daulat, c. 1610, Victoria and Albert Museum

Mir Bakhshi of the Mughal Empire
- In office 1600–?
- Monarch: Akbar

Subahdar of Gujarat
- In office 1606–1609
- Monarch: Jahangir
- Succeeded by: Mirza Aziz Koka

Personal details
- Born: Unknown
- Died: 1616
- Resting place: Serai Shahji, Delhi

Military service
- Allegiance: Mughal Empire

Shaikh Farid Bukhari (died 1616), also known by the title Murtaza Khan, was a leading Mughal noble of the 17th century. He served as mir bakhshi of the empire during the reign of the Mughal emperor Akbar. During the reign of Akbar's successor Jahangir, he played a key role in the suppression of prince Khusrau's rebellion, and later governed the provinces of Gujarat and Punjab. He was also well known as an architectural patron in Mughal India, and founded the city of Faridabad in modern-day Haryana, India.

== Background ==
Shaikh Farid Murtaza Khan was an Indian Muslim. His ancestors were likely learned men who had been given rent-free lands for their subsistence. One of them, Sayyid Abdul Ghaffar of Dehli, enjoined his descendants to adopt military profession instead of living on charity. Sheikh Farid's family had a long history of imperial service, such as his uncle Sheikh Muhammad Bukhari, who was one of Akbar's trusted men, and his brother Jafar Khan, who died fighting in Gujarat in 1573.

== Career ==
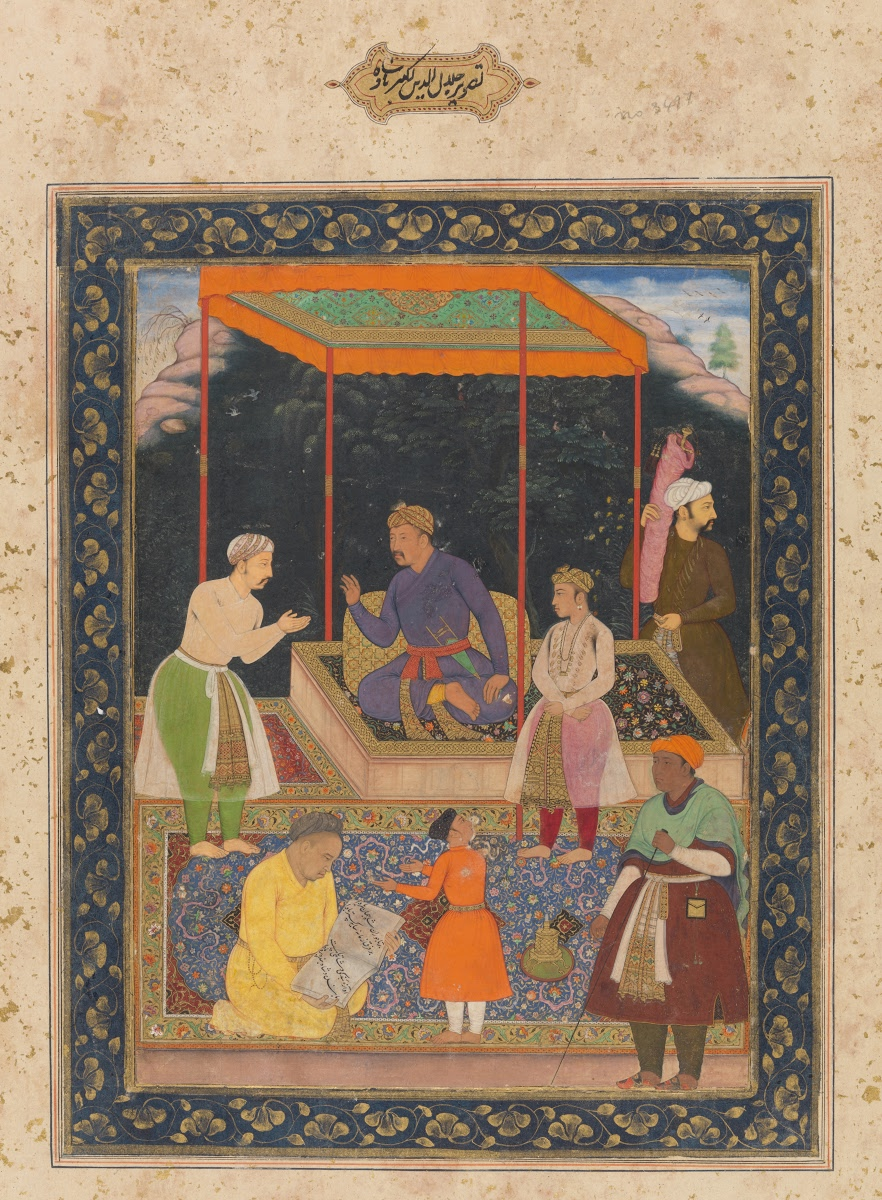
Emperor Akbar receives Murtaza Khan. By Manohar Das

Shaikh Farid was promoted to the command of 1500 horses by Akbar, for his achievements fighting against Afghans in Orissa. Akbar also bestowed upon him the title sahib-us-saif-w-al-qalam ('master of the sword and the pen'). In 1600, he rose to the post of mir bakhshi under Akbar.

In the Mughal court there was a movement of Naqshbandis who had been trying to garner power in the hopes of supplanting the religiously erratic Akbar with a more stable and orthodoxly Muslim emperor. Pierre de Jarric, a Jesuit missionary at the court of Akbar, described that Shaykh Farid had been sent as a representative of the orthodox faction to promise support for Prince Salim (future Mughal Emperor Jahangir), "provided that he would swear to defend the law of Mahomet". Shaykh Farid had been receiving letters from Shaykh Ahmad Sirhindi, and was his devoted disciple.

After Jahangir's coronation, prince Khusrau rebelled in 1606 and fled Agra, where he had been confined, towards the Punjab. Shaikh Farid pursued and defeated him at a battle near Bharowal. After Khusrau was later captured, Jahangir awarded Shaikh Farid the title 'Murtaza Khan' for his actions, and his rank was increased to 6000 horses. Jahangir also awarded him the site of the battle, Bharowal, as a land grant.

From 1606 to 1609, Shaikh Farid served as the governor (subahdar) of Gujarat under Jahangir. He built the tomb of Wajihuddin in Ahmedabad, Kadi fort, and Madresah Masjid of Bharuch. His relatives and officers oppressed Ahmedabad, which led to his replacement by Mirza Aziz Koka.

He later became the governor of Punjab. During this time, Jahangir gave him the infamous order of executing Sikh leader Guru Arjan.

== Architecture ==
Shaikh Farid was noted for his building activities in Mughal texts. A major undertaking was the establishment of Faridabad in 1607, to which he provided a caravanserai and mosque. As governor of Gujarat, he constructed extensively in the city of Ahmedabad; however none of these structures remain, with the exception of Wajihuddin's Tomb, the dargah of Sufi saint Wajihuddin Alvi. He also contributed several religious structures to the city of Bihar Sharif, and made additions to the Nizamuddin Dargah in Delhi.

== Tomb ==
Shaikh Farid's tomb is located in Malviya Nagar, Delhi, near a caravanserai constructed by him named Serai Shahji.
