= Basri Khurd =

Village in Rajasthan, India

Basri Khurd Basari Khurd
- Gram Panchayat
- Basri Khurd
- Location in Rajasthan, India Basri Khurd (India)
- Country: India
- State: Rajasthan
- District: Jaipur district

Government
  - Sarpanch: Jagnnath Yadav

Area
  - Total: 670.18 ha (1,656.1 acres)

Population (2011)
  - Total: 2,228
- Time zone: UTC+5:30 (IST)
- PIN: 303603

Basri Khurd or Basari Khurd is a village and Gram Panchayat in Jaipur district in Rajasthan, India. Basri Khurd has a total population of 2228 peoples according to Census 2011. Basri Khurd 65 km away from district headquarter Jaipur.
