= Sasalmari =

Coordinates: 15°42′N 76°46′E

Sasalamari
- village
- Interactive map of Sasalamari
- Country: India
- State: Karnataka
- District: Raichur
- Talukas: Sindhnur

Population (2001)
  - Total: 5,816

Languages
  - Official: Kannada
- Time zone: UTC+5:30 (IST)

Sasalmari is a village in the southern state of Karnataka, India. It is located in the Sindhnur taluk of Raichur district in Karnataka.

== Demographics ==
As of 2001 India census, Sasalmari had a population of 5816 with 2909 males and 2907 females.

== See also ==
- Raichur
- Districts of Karnataka
