= Amarsar =

Town in Jaipur district, Rajasthan, India

Coordinates: 27.372°N 75.832°E

Amarsar is a village in Jaipur district, Rajasthan, India.

== Agriculture ==
Amarsar has farms ranging in size from small to large. Crops raised by small farms include mustard and gram in the rabi season (planted in winter and harvested in spring) and cotton in the kharif season (between April and October, during the rainy monsoon season). Crops raised by large farms include gram and wheat during the rabi season and guar and cotton during the kharif season.

== See also ==
- Basri Khurd
