= Terwa Dahigawan =

- village
- Location in Uttar Pradesh, India Terwa Dahigawan (India)
- Coordinates: 27.07°N 80.29°E
- Country: India
- State: Uttar Pradesh
- District: Hardoi

Population (2011)
  - Total: 3,597

Languages
  - Official: Hindi
- Time zone: UTC+5:30 (IST)
- Postal code: 241305

Terwa Dahigawan is a village in the Hardoi district of Uttar Pradesh in India. It is a revenue village consisting of one main village (Terwa) and a hamlet (Dahigawan). It comes under Kachhona block of Sandila tehsil. At the 2011 census, the village had a population of 3,597.
